= List of dams in Saga Prefecture =

The following is a list of dams in Saga Prefecture, Japan.

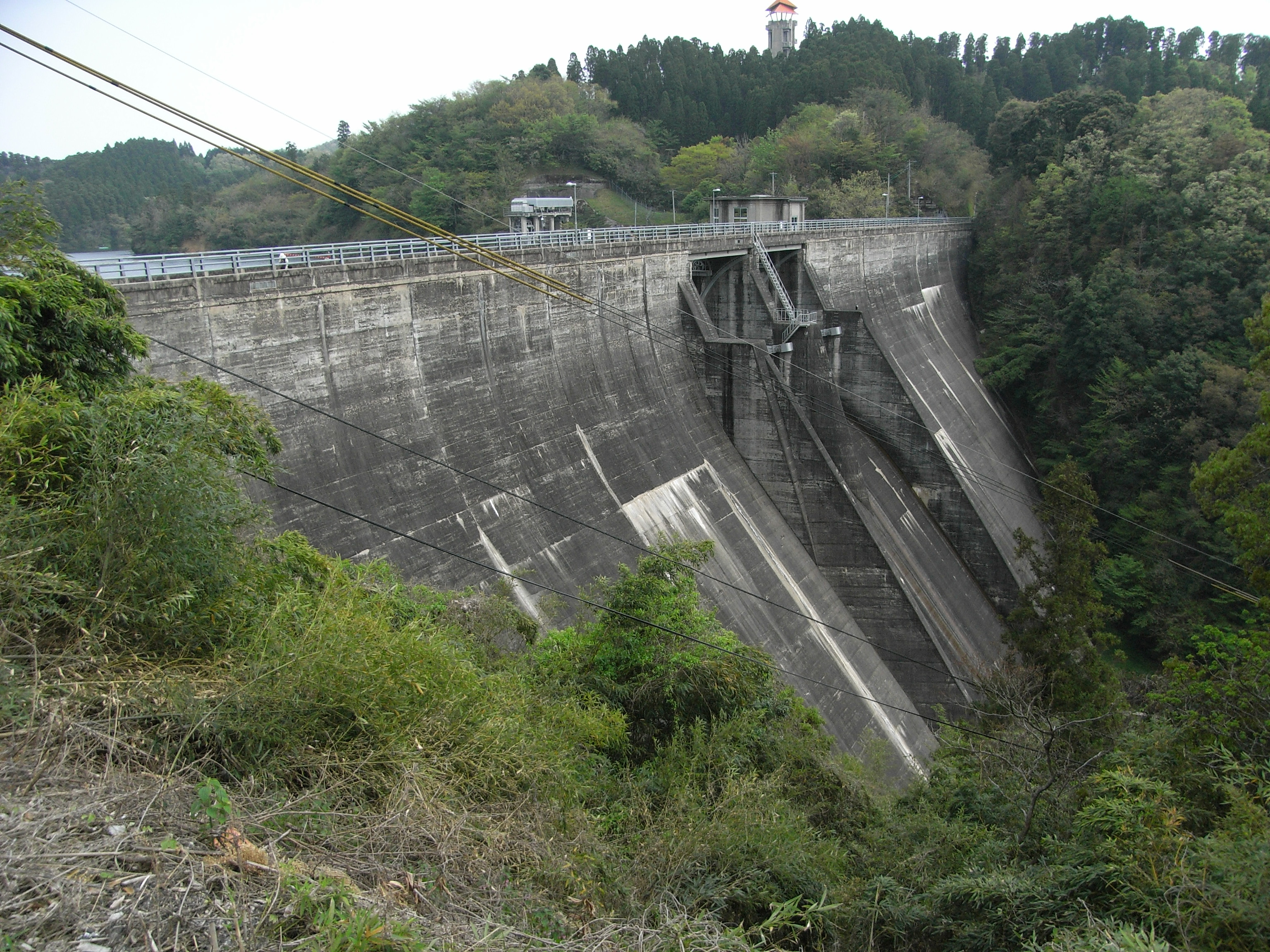
Hokuzan Dam, taken in 2008

== List ==
Name	Location	Construction started	Opened	Height (metres)	Length (metres)	DiJ no.
Agekura Dam		1972	1992	19.6	196.8	2547
Akasaka Dam		1972	1992	30.4	256.4	2548
Amagase Dam		1972	1982	39.4	270	2541
Arita Dam		1958	1961	27.5	108	2526
Asahi Dam						
Banzai Tameike Dam			1973	17.5	128	2531
Fuchinoo Dam		1979	1980	29	138	2556
Fujinohira Dam		1990	2002	58.4	296.2	2549
Fukaura Dam		1977	1989	26	121	2546
Furukoba Dam		1973	1998	26.8	193	2542
Hanatori Tameike Dam			1969	22.5	176	2530
Hansho Dam		1973	1978	29.4	156	2536
Hatcho Dam		1973	1982	24.6	346.6	2538
Hinomine Dam		1982	2001	28.4	112	2560
Hirakoba Dam		1972	1983	29.5	117	2543
Hokuzan Dam		1950	1956	59.3	180	2524
Ikisa Dam		1969	1979	58.5	203	2540
Inubashiri Dam						
Iwayagawauchi Dam		1967	1973	59.5	192	2533
Kasegawa Dam		1973	2011	97, 99	454.5, 456	2553
Karitate Dam		1982	2001	28.4	177	2559
Kawachi Dam			1971	35	153	2528
Kishikawa Dam			1962	26.5	66	2527
Kitaura Tameike Dam			1948	17.9	192	2522
Kogo-ike Dam			1948	16	100	2523
Kyuragi Dam		1973	1986	117	390.4	2545
Kyuragigawa Choseichi Dam		1918	1930	15.5	59.8	2515
Motobe Dam		1979	1988	42.1	130	2555
Nagahama Dam						
Nakakoba Dam		1978	2007	69.5	265	2552
Nanamagari Tameike Dam			1973	15.3	133	2532
Niwaki Dam		1985	1994	26.2	130	2557
Ohura Dam		1970	1987	45	160	2534
Ryumon Dam		1968	1975	42.2	150	2535
Sasahara Tameike Dam			1970	26.3	175	2529
Tenzan Dam		1978	1986	69	380	2550
Uchiage Dam		1972	1992	36.1	181.8	2539
Ushirogawachi Dam		1972	1992	42.2	250	2544
Yokotake Dam		1973	2001	57	249	2551
Yahazu Dam		1981	1993	32.5	199	2558

== See also ==
- Media related to Dams in Saga prefecture at Wikimedia Commons
