= List of dams in Kyoto Prefecture =

The following is a list of dams in Kyoto Prefecture, Japan.

== List ==
Name	Location	Opened	Height (metres)	Image
Amagase Dam		1964		
Hatagawa Dam		2012	34	
Hatagawawaki Dam		2012	21.8	
Hinokuchidani-ike Dam		1937	16	
Hiyoshi Dam		1996	67.4	
Hosho-ike Dam		1932	22	
Kisenyama Dam		1970	91	
Kishitani Dam		1921	30	
Kukigatani-ike Dam		1949	15.3	
Mawari-ike Dam		1880	30	
Nishigatani Dam		1996	24.8	
Ono Dam		1960	61.4	
Ohno-ike Dam		1936	20	
Segi Dam		1951	35.5	
Showa-ike Dam		1930	27.5	
Sumizome Dam				
Taisho-ike Dam		1999	26.5	
Takayama Dam			67	
Tomisaka-ike Dam		1997	19.5	
Toyotomi Yosui-ike Dam		1952	28.6	
Tsūtenko Dam				
Wachi Dam		1968	25.2	
Yuragawa Dam		1924	15.2	

== See also ==
- Media related to Dams in Kyoto prefecture at Wikimedia Commons
