= List of dams in Ibaraki Prefecture =

The following is a list of dams in Ibaraki Prefecture, Japan.

== List ==
Name	Location	Opened	Height (metres)	Image
Fudoyatsu-ike Dam		1978	16.6	
Fujiigawa Dam		2009	37.5	
Fukuoka Dam				
Gozenyama Dam		2011	52	
Hananuki Dam			45.3	
Iida Dam		1991	33	
Juo Dam			48.6	
Koyama Dam			65	
Kozogawa Dam		1985	35	
Minamishiio Choseichi Dam		1991	27.4	
Minowa-ike Dam		1963	16	
Mizunuma Dam			33.7	
Ryūjin kyō				

== See also ==
- Media related to Dams in Ibaraki prefecture at Wikimedia Commons
