= List of dams in Tokyo =

The following is a list of dams in Tokyo, Japan.

== List ==
Name	Location	Started	Opened	Height	Length	Image	DiJ number
Ara-zutsumi Dam		1933	1934	17 m (56 ft)	44 m (144 ft)		3599
Chibusa Dam		1971	1973	16.5 m (54 ft)	64 m (210 ft)		3592
Lower Murayama Dam		2003	2008	32.6 m (107 ft)			3323
Ogōchi Dam			26 Nov 1957	149 m (489 ft)			0692
Shigure Dam			1976	24.2 m (79 ft)	94 m (308 ft)		0694
Shiromaru Dam		1957	1962	30.3 m (99 ft)	61 m (200 ft)		0693
Tamagawa Dam							
Upper Murayama Dam			1924	24.2 m (79 ft)	318.2 m (1,044 ft)		0690

== See also ==
- Media related to Dams in Tokyo at Wikimedia Commons
