= Shigure =

The Japanese name Shigure is noteworthy in several contexts:

== Places ==
- Shigure Dam, an asphalt dam located in Tokyo prefecture in Japan

== Songs ==
- Ōsaka Shigure, is the 82nd single released by Japanese singer Harumi Miyako

== People ==
- Shigure Ui, (しぐれうい) Japanese illustrator, manga artist, light novel character designer and VTuber
- Hasegawa Shigure, (長谷川 時雨; 1879–1941) Japanese playwright and editor of a literary journal

== Characters ==
- Shigure, a major character in the Japanese anime series, Ninja Scroll
- Shigure, a demon surgeon from the Yu Yu Hakusho series
- Shigure Kōsaka, a mysterious female ninja from the manga and anime series Shijō Saikyō no Deshi Kenichi
- Shigure Sohma, from the Fruits Basket anime
- Shigure Yukimi, a soldier from the Seraph of the End series
- Asa Shigure or Ama Shigure, characters from the Shuffle! series of games/anime
- Kokoro Shigure, a magical girl from the anime series You and Idol Pretty Cure

== Other ==
- Japanese destroyer Shigure, two Imperial Japanese Navy destroyers
- a Rain Ninja Genin in Naruto
- Shigure Soen, the sword style that Takeshi Yamamoto uses in the anime series, Reborn!
