= Ohyodogawa No.2 Choseichi Dam =

Dam in Miyazaki Prefecture, Japan

Ohyodogawa No.2 Choseichi
- Location within Japan
- Official name: 大淀川第二調整池
- Location: Miyazaki Prefecture, Japan
- Coordinates: 31°56′24″N 131°14′24″E
- Construction began: 1926
- Opening date: 1931

Dam and spillways
- Height: 21.8 m (72 ft)
- Length: 149.1 m (489 ft)

Reservoir
- Total capacity: 242,000 m^{3} (8,500,000 cu ft)
- Catchment area: 3.7 km^{2} (1.4 sq mi)
- Surface area: 4 hectares (9.9 acres)

Ohyodogawa No.2 Choseichi (Japanese: 大淀川第二調整池) is a gravity dam located in Miyazaki Prefecture in Japan. The dam is used for power production. The catchment area of the dam is 3.7 km^{2}. The dam impounds about 4 ha of land when full and can store 242 thousand cubic meters of water. The construction of the dam was started on 1926 and completed in 1931.

== See also ==
- List of dams in Japan
