= TakaokaDam =

Dam in Miyazaki Prefecture, Japan

- Location within Japan
- Official name: 高岡ダム
- Location: Miyazaki Prefecture, Japan
- Coordinates: 31°56′15″N 131°12′21″E
- Construction began: 1926
- Opening date: 1931

Dam and spillways
- Height: 38.9 m (128 ft)
- Length: 124.2 m (407 ft)

Reservoir
- Total capacity: 12,464,000 m^{3} (440,200,000 cu ft)
- Catchment area: 1,373.6 km^{2} (530.3 sq mi)
- Surface area: 96 hectares (240 acres)

TakaokaDam (Japanese: 高岡ダム) is a gravity dam located in Miyazaki Prefecture in Japan. The dam is used for power production. The catchment area of the dam is 1373.6 km^{2}. The dam impounds about 96 ha of land when full and can store 12464 thousand cubic meters of water. The construction of the dam was started on 1926 and completed in 1931.

== See also ==
- List of dams in Japan
