= Saigou Dam =

Dam in Miyazaki Prefecture, Japan

Saigou Dam (Re)
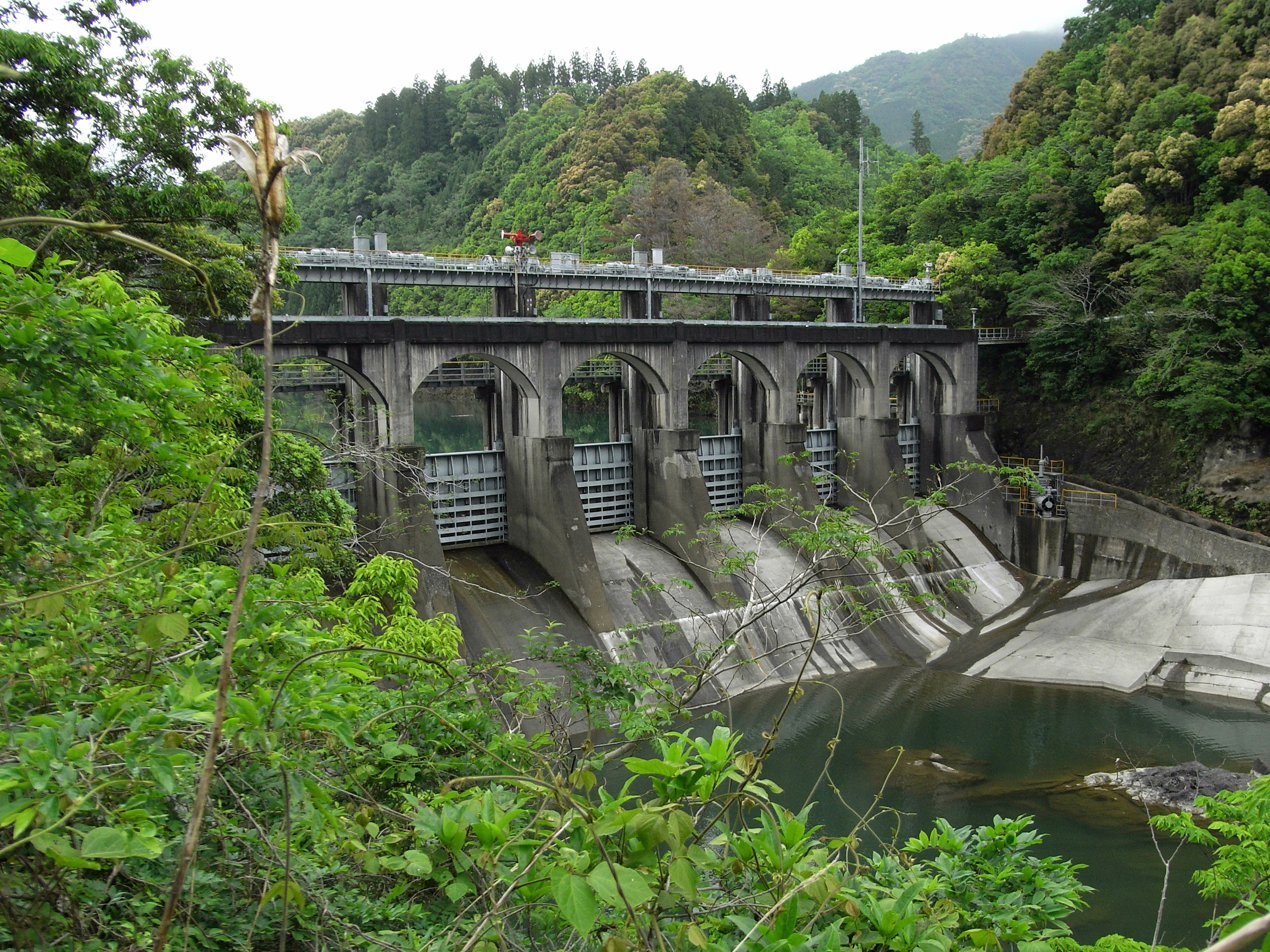

- Location within Japan
- Official name: 西郷ダム（再）
- Location: Miyazaki Prefecture, Japan
- Coordinates: 32°27′31″N 131°24′10″E
- Construction began: 2011
- Opening date: 2018

Dam and spillways
- Height: 20 m (66 ft)
- Length: 84.5 m (277 ft)

Reservoir
- Total capacity: 2,452,000 m^{3} (86,600,000 cu ft)
- Catchment area: 647.8 km^{2} (250.1 sq mi)
- Surface area: 40 hectares (99 acres)

Saigou Dam (Japanese: 西郷ダム（再）) is a gravity dam located in Miyazaki Prefecture in Japan. The dam is used for power production. The catchment area of the dam is 647.8 km^{2}. The dam impounds about 40 ha of land when full and can store 2452 thousand cubic meters of water. The construction of the dam was started on 2011 and completed in 2018.

== See also ==
- List of dams in Japan
