= Ohyodogawa No.1 Dam =

Dam in Miyazaki Prefecture, Japan

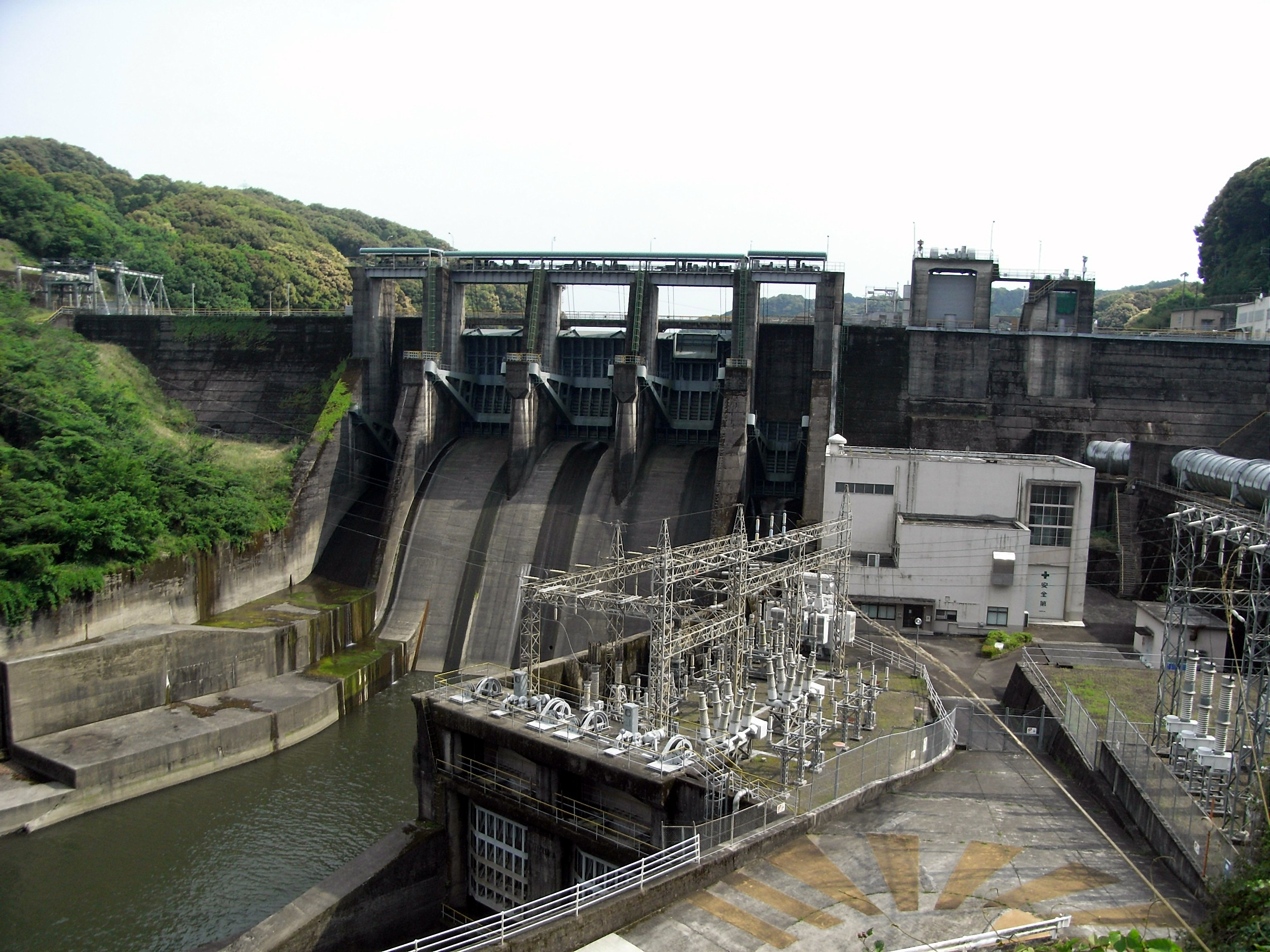

- Location within Japan
- Official name: 大淀川第一ダム
- Location: Miyazaki Prefecture, Japan
- Coordinates: 31°55′08″N 131°8′03″E
- Construction began: 1918
- Opening date: 1925

Dam and spillways
- Height: 47 m (154 ft)
- Length: 178.6 m (586 ft)

Reservoir
- Total capacity: 8,500,000 m^{3} (300,000,000 cu ft)
- Catchment area: 941 km^{2} (363 sq mi)
- Surface area: 80 hectares (200 acres)

Ohyodogawa No.1 Dam (Japanese: 大淀川第一ダム) is a gravity dam located in Miyazaki Prefecture in Japan. The dam is used for power production. The catchment area of the dam is 941 km^{2}. The dam impounds about 80 ha of land when full and can store 8500 thousand cubic meters of water. The construction of the dam was started on 1918 and completed in 1925.

== See also ==
- List of dams in Japan
