= Takanabe Bosai Dam =

Dam in Miyazaki Prefecture, Japan

- Location within Japan
- Official name: 高鍋防災ダム
- Location: Miyazaki Prefecture, Japan
- Coordinates: 32°7′17″N 131°28′34″E
- Opening date: 1968

Dam and spillways
- Height: 25.5 m (84 ft)
- Length: 179.1 m (588 ft)

Reservoir
- Total capacity: 1,194,000 m^{3} (42,200,000 cu ft)
- Catchment area: 13.4 km^{2} (5.2 sq mi)
- Surface area: 14 hectares (35 acres)

Takanabe Bosai Dam (Japanese: 高鍋防災ダム) is an earthfill dam located in Miyazaki Prefecture in Japan. The dam is used for flood control and irrigation. The catchment area of the dam is 13.4 km^{2}. The dam impounds about 14 ha of land when full and can store 1194 thousand cubic meters of water. The construction of the dam was completed in 1968.

== See also ==
- List of dams in Japan
