= Ohuchibaru Dam =

Dam in Miyazaki Prefecture, Japan

- Location within Japan
- Official name: 大内原ダム
- Location: Miyazaki Prefecture, Japan
- Coordinates: 32°25′47″N 131°28′54″E
- Construction began: 1953
- Opening date: 1956

Dam and spillways
- Height: 25.5 m (84 ft)
- Length: 152.6 m (501 ft)

Reservoir
- Total capacity: 7,488,000 m^{3} (264,400,000 cu ft)
- Catchment area: 741 km^{2} (286 sq mi)
- Surface area: 88 hectares (220 acres)

Ohuchibaru Dam (Japanese: 大内原ダム) is a gravity dam located in Miyazaki Prefecture in Japan. The dam is used for power production. The catchment area of the dam is 741 km^{2}. The dam impounds about 88 ha of land when full and can store 7488 thousand cubic meters of water. The construction of the dam was started on 1953 and completed in 1956.

== See also ==
- List of dams in Japan
