= Hatagawawaki Dam =

Dam in Kyoto Prefecture, Japan

- Location within Japan
- Official name: 畑川脇ダム
- Location: Kyoto Prefecture, Japan
- Coordinates: 35°12′27″N 135°26′20″E
- Construction began: 1992
- Opening date: 2012

Dam and spillways
- Height: 21.8 m (72 ft)
- Length: 105 m (344 ft)

Reservoir
- Total capacity: 1960 thousand cubic meters
- Catchment area: 21.2 sq. km
- Surface area: 20 hectares

Hatagawawaki Dam (Japanese: 畑川脇ダム) is a gravity dam located in Kyoto Prefecture in Japan. The dam is used for flood control and water supply. The catchment area of the dam is 21.2 km^{2}. The dam impounds about 20 hectares of land when full and can also store 1960 thousand cubic meters of water. The construction of the dam was started on 1992 and was completed in 2012.

== See also ==
- List of dams in Japan
