= Hinokuchidani-ike Dam =

Dam in Kyoto Prefecture, Japan

Hinokuchidani-ike
- Location within Japan
- Official name: 火の口谷池
- Location: Kyoto Prefecture, Japan
- Coordinates: 35°16′48″N 135°21′20″E
- Opening date: 1937

Dam and spillways
- Height: 16 m (52 ft)
- Length: 45 m (148 ft)

Reservoir
- Total capacity: 32 thousand cubic meters
- Surface area: 4 hectares

Hinokuchidani-ike (Japanese: 火の口谷池) is an earthfill dam located in Kyoto Prefecture in Japan. The dam is used for irrigation. The dam impounds about 4 ha of land when full and can store 32 thousand cubic meters of water. The construction of the dam was completed in 1937.

== See also ==
- List of dams in Japan
