= Fudoyatsu-ike Dam =

Dam in Ibaraki Prefecture, Japan

- Location within Ibaraki Prefecture Location within Japan
- Interactive map of Fudoyatsu-ike Dam
- Official name: 不動谷津池
- Location: Ibaraki Prefecture, Japan
- Coordinates: 36°22′11″N 140°19′05″E
- Construction began: 1969
- Opening date: 1978

Dam and spillways
- Height: 16.6 m (54 ft)
- Length: 112 m (367 ft)

Reservoir
- Total capacity: 222 thousand cubic meters
- Surface area: 5 hectares

Fudoyatsu-ike Dam (Japanese: 不動谷津池) is an earthfill dam located in Ibaraki Prefecture in Japan. The dam is used for irrigation. The dam impounds about 5 ha of land when full and can store 222 thousand cubic meters of water. The construction of the dam was started on 1969 and completed in 1978.

== See also ==
- List of dams in Japan
