= Ohno-ike Dam =

Dam in Kyoto Prefecture, Japan

Ohno-ike
- Location within Japan
- Official name: 大野池
- Location: Kyoto Prefecture, Japan
- Coordinates: 35°34′43″N 135°4′39″E
- Opening date: 1936

Dam and spillways
- Height: 20 m (66 ft)
- Length: 80 m (260 ft)

Reservoir
- Total capacity: 56,000 m^{3} (2,000,000 cu ft)
- Surface area: 1 hectare (2.5 acres)

Ohno-ike (Japanese: 大野池) is an earthfill dam located in Kyoto Prefecture in Japan. The dam is used for irrigation and water supply. The dam impounds about 1 ha of land when full and can store 56 thousand cubic meters of water. The construction of the dam was completed in 1936.

== See also ==
- List of dams in Japan
