= Kishitani Dam =

Dam in Kyoto Prefecture, Japan

- Location within Japan
- Official name: 岸谷ダム
- Location: Kyoto Prefecture, Japan
- Coordinates: 35°26′34″N 135°26′12″E
- Construction began: 1917
- Opening date: 1921

Dam and spillways
- Height: 30 m (98 ft)
- Length: 148 m (486 ft)

Reservoir
- Total capacity: 210 thousand cubic meters
- Catchment area: 1.6 sq. km
- Surface area: 2 hectares

Kishitani Dam (Japanese: 岸谷ダム) is an earthfill dam located in Kyoto Prefecture in Japan. The dam is used for water supply. The catchment area of the dam is 1.6 km^{2}. The dam impounds about 2 ha of land when full and can store 210 thousand cubic meters of water. The construction of the dam was started on 1917 and completed in 1921.

== See also ==
- List of dams in Japan
