= Segi Dam =

Dam in Kyoto Prefecture, Japan

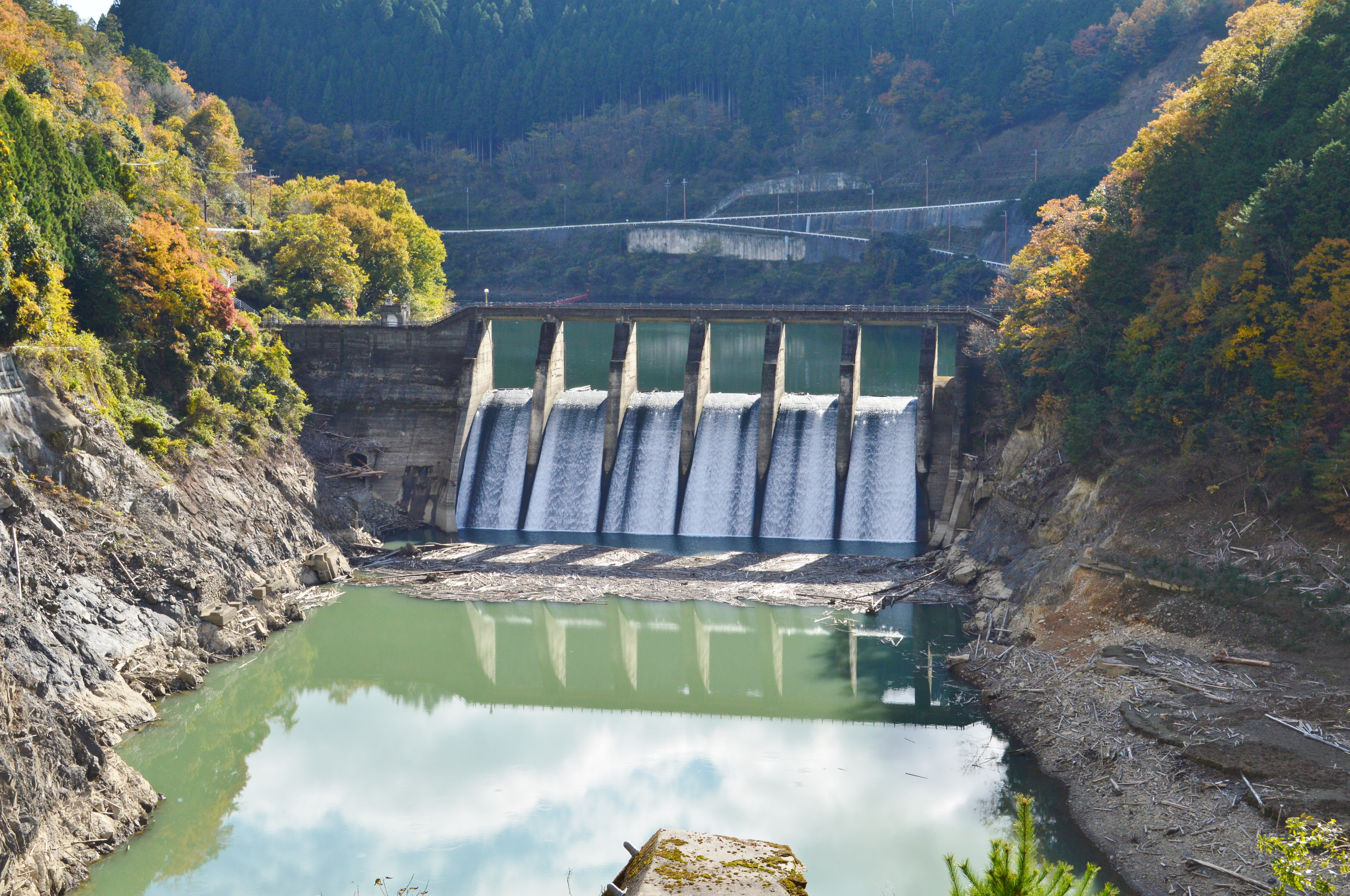

- Location within Japan
- Official name: 世木ダム
- Location: Kyoto Prefecture, Japan
- Coordinates: 35°8′00″N 135°33′20″E
- Construction began: 1950
- Opening date: 1951

Dam and spillways
- Height: 35.5 m (116 ft)
- Length: 138.2 m (453 ft)

Reservoir
- Total capacity: 5,595,000 m^{3} (197,600,000 cu ft)
- Catchment area: 279 km^{2} (108 sq mi)
- Surface area: 48 hectares (120 acres)

Segi Dam (Japanese: 世木ダム) is a gravity dam located in Kyoto Prefecture in Japan. The dam is used for power production. The catchment area of the dam is 279 km^{2}. The dam impounds about 48 ha of land when full and can store 5595 thousand cubic meters of water. The construction of the dam was started on 1950 and completed in 1951.

== See also ==
- List of dams in Japan
