= Kisenyama Dam =

Dam in Kyoto Prefecture, Japan

- Location within Japan
- Official name: 喜撰山ダム
- Location: Kyoto Prefecture, Japan
- Coordinates: 34°53′43″N 135°51′13″E
- Construction began: 1966
- Opening date: 1970

Dam and spillways
- Height: 91 m (299 ft)
- Length: 255 m (837 ft)

Reservoir
- Total capacity: 7,227 m^{3}
- Catchment area: 0.9 km^{2}
- Surface area: 31 hectares

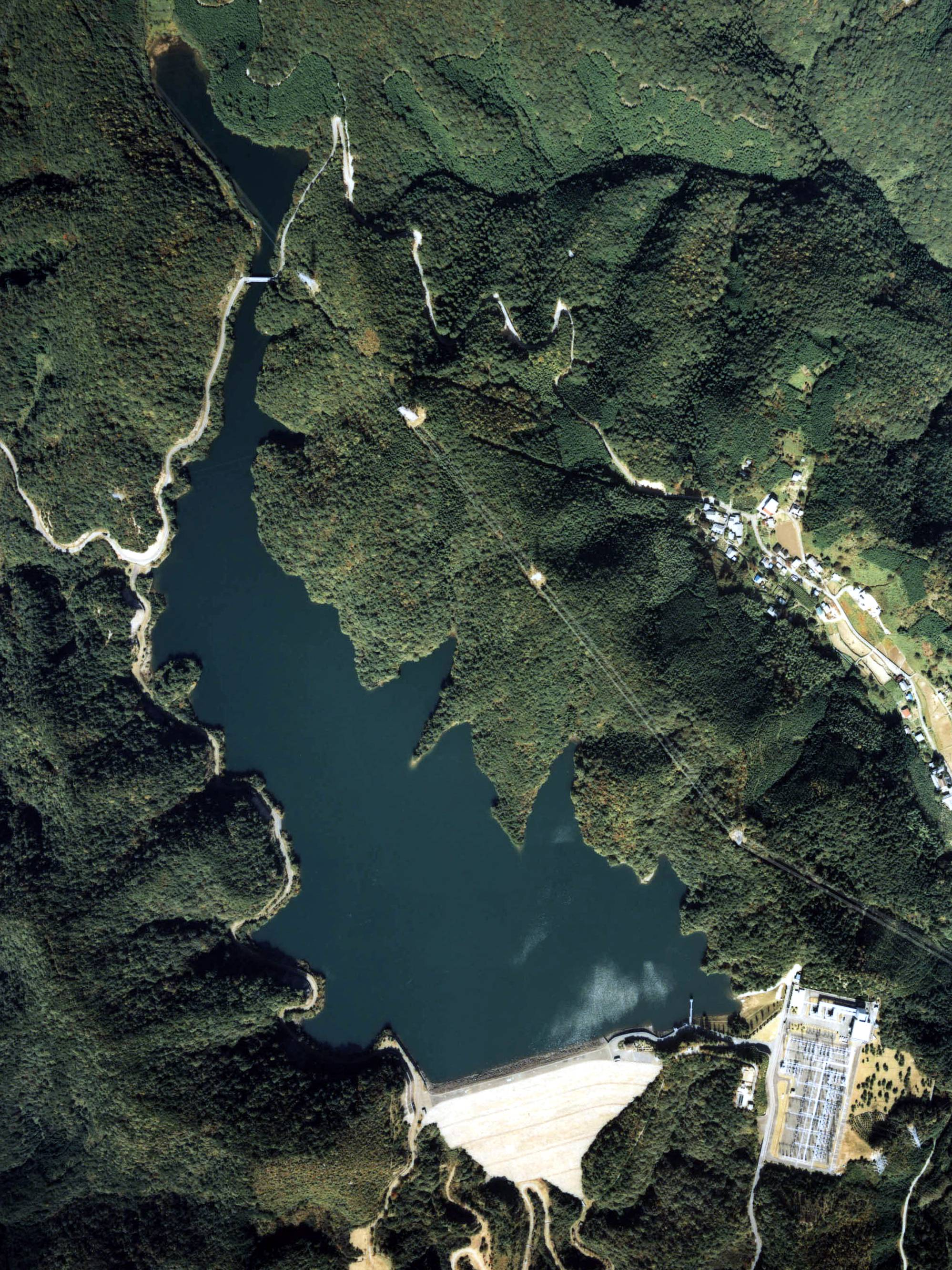

Kisenyama Dam (Japanese: 喜撰山ダム) is a rockfill dam located in Kyoto Prefecture in Japan. The dam is used for power production. The catchment area of the dam is 0.9 km^{2}. The dam impounds about 31 hectares of land when full and can store 7,227 m^{3} of water. The construction of the dam was started in 1966 and was completed in 1970.

== See also ==
- List of dams in Japan
