= Hatagawa Dam =

Dam in Kyoto Prefecture, Japan

- Location within Japan
- Interactive map of Hatagawa Dam
- Official name: 畑川ダム
- Location: Kyoto Prefecture, Japan
- Coordinates: 35°12′35″N 135°26′08″E
- Construction began: 1992
- Opening date: 2012

Dam and spillways
- Height: 34 m (112 ft)
- Length: 87.8 m (288 ft)

Reservoir
- Total capacity: 1960 thousand cubic meters
- Catchment area: 21.2 sq. km
- Surface area: 20 hectares

Hatagawa Dam (Japanese: 畑川ダム) is a gravity dam located in Kyoto Prefecture in Japan. The dam is used for flood control and water supply. The catchment area of the dam is 21.2 km^{2}. The dam impounds about 20 ha of land when full and can store 1960 thousand cubic meters of water. The construction of the dam was started in 1992 and completed in 2012.

== See also ==
- List of dams in Japan
