= Gozenyama Dam =

Dam in Ibaraki Prefecture, Japan

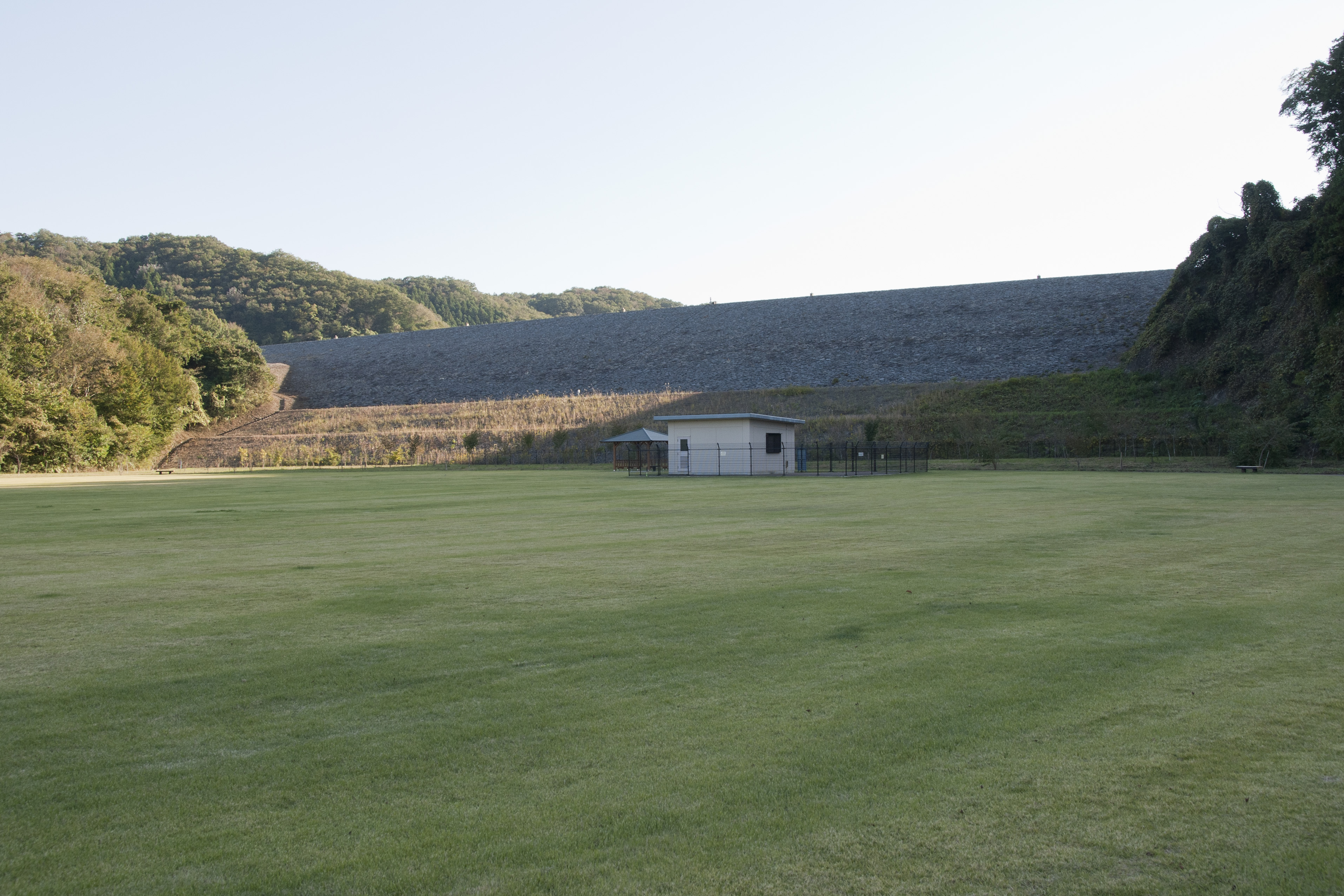

- Location within Ibaraki Prefecture Location within Japan
- Interactive map of Gozenyama Dam
- Official name: 御前山ダム
- Location: Ibaraki Prefecture, Japan
- Coordinates: 36°33′11″N 140°17′15″E
- Construction began: 1987
- Opening date: 2011

Dam and spillways
- Height: 52 m (171 ft)
- Length: 298 m (978 ft)

Reservoir
- Total capacity: 7200 thousand cubic meters
- Catchment area: 23.3 sq. km
- Surface area: 50 hectares

Gozenyama Dam (Japanese: 御前山ダム) is a rockfill dam located in Ibaraki Prefecture in Japan. The dam is used for irrigation. The catchment area of the dam is 23.3 km^{2}. The dam impounds about 50 ha of land when full and can store 7200 thousand cubic meters of water. The construction of the dam was started on 1987 and completed in 2011.

== See also ==
- List of dams in Japan
