= Hosho-ike Dam =

Dam in Kyoto Prefecture, Japan

- Location within Japan
- Official name: 豊昌池
- Location: Kyoto Prefecture, Japan
- Coordinates: 35°15′40″N 135°22′34″E
- Opening date: 1932

Dam and spillways
- Height: 22 m (72 ft)
- Length: 86 m (282 ft)

Reservoir
- Total capacity: 79 thousand cubic meters
- Surface area: 1 hectares

Hosho-ike Dam (Japanese: 豊昌池) is an earthfill dam located in Kyoto Prefecture in Japan. The dam is used for irrigation. The dam impounds about 1 ha of land when full and can store 79 thousand cubic meters of water. The construction of the dam was completed in 1932.

== See also ==
- List of dams in Japan
