= Showa-ike Dam (Kyoto) =

Dam in Kyoto Prefecture, Japan

Showa-ike
- Location within Japan
- Official name: 昭和池
- Location: Kyoto Prefecture, Japan
- Coordinates: 34°57′43″N 135°31′33″E
- Opening date: 1930

Dam and spillways
- Height: 27.5 m (90 ft)
- Length: 75 m (246 ft)

Reservoir
- Total capacity: 393,000 m^{3} (13,900,000 cu ft)
- Catchment area: 2.1 km^{2} (0.81 sq mi)
- Surface area: 5 hectares (12 acres)

Showa-ike (Japanese: 昭和池) is an earthfill dam located in Kyoto Prefecture in Japan. The dam is used for irrigation. The catchment area of the dam is 2.1 km^{2}. The dam impounds about 5 ha of land when full and can store 393 thousand cubic meters of water. The construction of the dam was completed in 1930.

== See also ==
- List of dams in Japan
