= Mawari-ike Dam =

Dam in Kyoto Prefecture, Japan

Mawari-ike dam
- Location within Japan
- Official name: 廻り池
- Location: Kyoto Prefecture, Japan
- Coordinates: 35°5′32″N 135°36′21″E
- Opening date: 1880

Dam and spillways
- Height: 30 m (98 ft)
- Length: 51 m (167 ft)

Reservoir
- Total capacity: 950 thousand cubic meters
- Catchment area: 5.4 sq. km
- Surface area: 10 hectares

Mawari-ike Dam (Japanese: 廻り池) is an earthfill dam located in Kyoto Prefecture in Japan. The dam is used for irrigation. The catchment area of the dam is 5.4 km^{2}. The dam impounds about 10 ha of land when full and can store 950 thousand cubic meters of water. The construction of the dam was completed in 1880.

== See also ==
- List of dams in Japan
