= Kukigatani-ike Dam =

Dam in Kyoto Prefecture, Japan

- Location within Japan
- Official name: 九鬼ヶ谷池
- Location: Kyoto Prefecture, Japan
- Coordinates: 35°16′31″N 135°34′36″E
- Opening date: 1949

Dam and spillways
- Height: 15.3 m (50 ft)
- Length: 48 m (157 ft)

Reservoir
- Total capacity: 20 thousand cubic meters
- Surface area: 1 hectares

Kukigatani-ike Dam (Japanese: 九鬼ヶ谷池) is an earthfill dam located in Kyoto Prefecture in Japan. The dam is used for flood control and irrigation. The dam impounds about 1 ha of land when full and can store 20 thousand cubic meters of water. The construction of the dam was completed in 1949.

== See also ==
- List of dams in Japan
