= Ono Dam =

Dam in Kyoto Prefecture, Japan

Ohno Dam
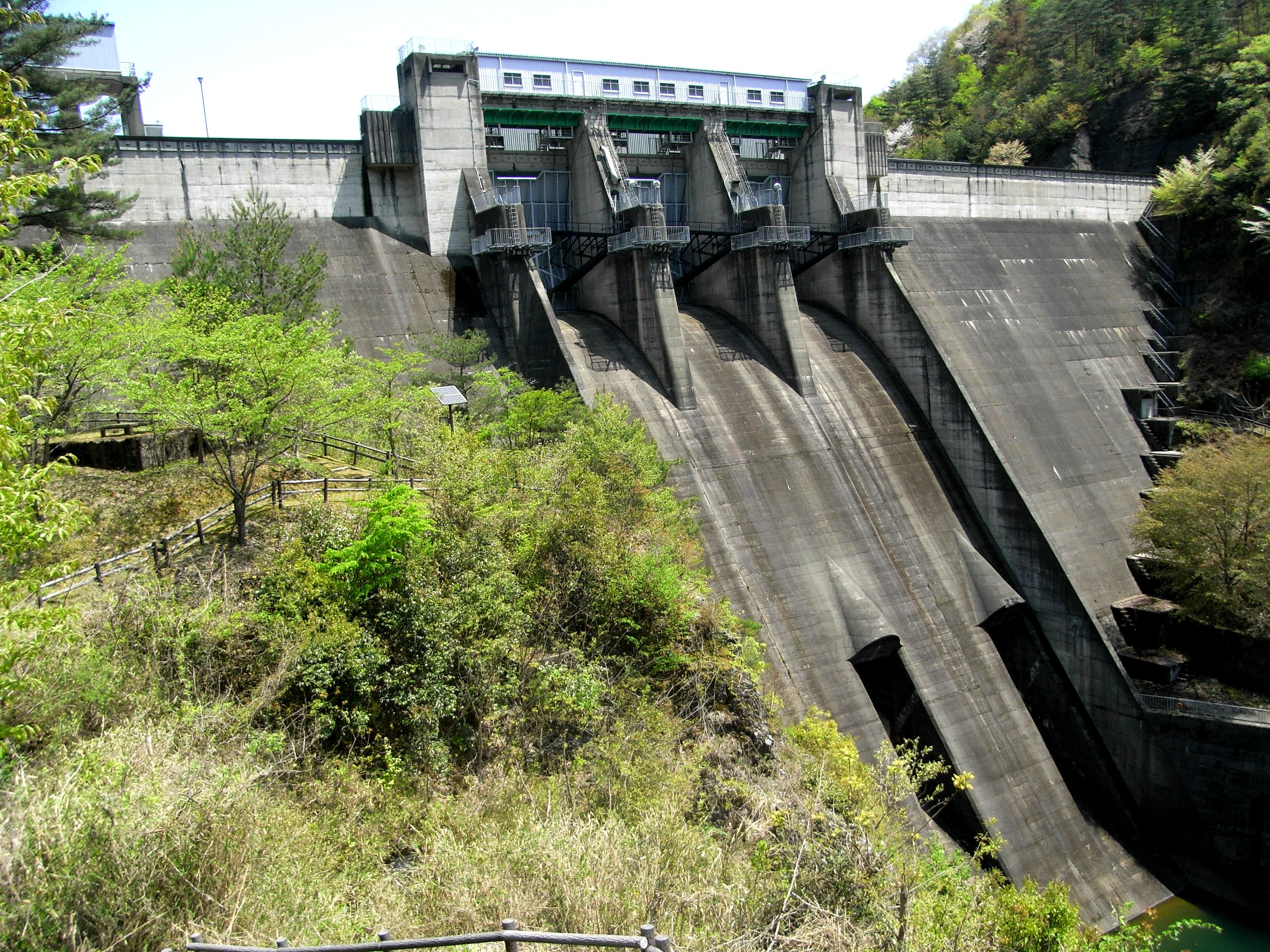

- Location within Japan
- Official name: 大野ダム
- Location: Kyoto Prefecture, Japan
- Coordinates: 35°15′45″N 135°27′39″E
- Construction began: 1957
- Opening date: 1960

Dam and spillways
- Height: 61.4 m (201 ft)
- Length: 305 m (1,001 ft)

Reservoir
- Total capacity: 28,550,000 m^{3} (1.008×10^{9} cu ft)
- Catchment area: 354 km^{2} (137 sq mi)
- Surface area: 186 hectares (460 acres)

Ohno Dam (Japanese: 大野ダム) is a gravity dam located in Kyoto Prefecture in Japan. The dam is used for flood control and power production. The catchment area of the dam is 354 km^{2}. The dam impounds about 186 ha of land when full and can store 28550 thousand cubic meters of water. The construction of the dam was started on 1957 and completed in 1960.

== See also ==
- List of dams in Japan
