= Minowa-ike Dam =

Dam in Ibaraki Prefecture, Japan

- Location within Ibaraki Prefecture Location within Japan
- Official name: 三野輪池
- Location: Ibaraki Prefecture, Japan
- Coordinates: 36°23′54″N 140°21′35″E
- Opening date: 1963

Dam and spillways
- Height: 16 m (52 ft)
- Length: 120 m (390 ft)

Reservoir
- Total capacity: 432 thousand cubic meters
- Catchment area: 1.4 sq. km
- Surface area: 7 hectares

Minowa-ike Dam (Japanese: 三野輪池) is an earthfill dam located in Ibaraki Prefecture in Japan. The dam is used for irrigation. The catchment area of the dam is 1.4 km^{2}. The dam impounds about 7 ha of land when full and can store 432 thousand cubic meters of water. The construction of the dam was completed in 1963.

== See also ==
- List of dams in Japan
