= Iida Dam =

Dam in Ibaraki Prefecture, Japan

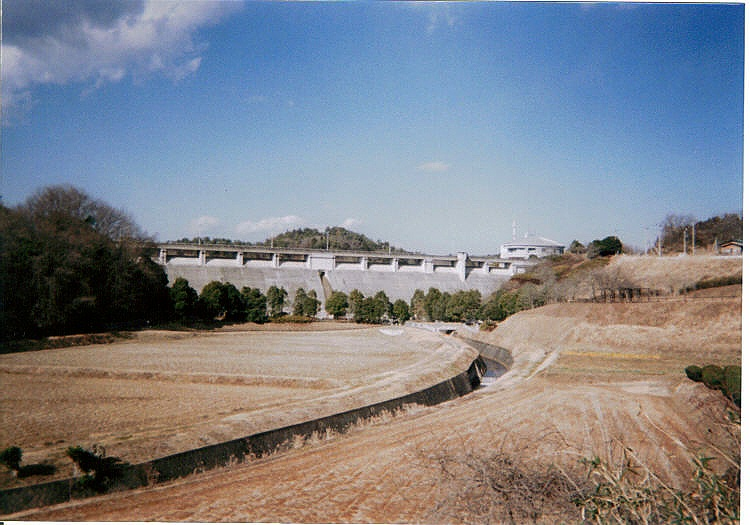

- Location within Ibaraki Prefecture Location within Japan
- Interactive map of Iida Dam
- Official name: 飯田ダム
- Location: Ibaraki Prefecture, Japan
- Coordinates: 36°25′28″N 140°16′47″E
- Construction began: 1974
- Opening date: 1991

Dam and spillways
- Height: 33 m (108 ft)
- Length: 219.5 m (720 ft)

Reservoir
- Total capacity: 2440 thousand cubic meters
- Catchment area: 20.8 sq. km
- Surface area: 28 hectares

Iida Dam (Japanese: 飯田ダム) is a gravity dam located in Ibaraki Prefecture in Japan. The dam is used for flood control and water supply. The catchment area of the dam is 20.8 km^{2}. The dam impounds about 28 ha of land when full and can store 2440 thousand cubic meters of water. The construction of the dam was started on 1974 and completed in 1991.

== See also ==
- List of dams in Japan
