= Fujiigawa Dam =

Dam in Ibaraki Prefecture, Japan

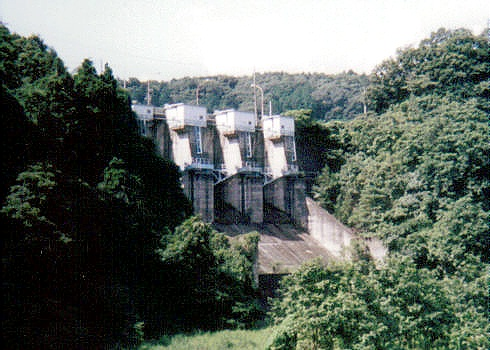

- Location within Ibaraki Prefecture Location within Japan
- Interactive map of Fujiigawa Dam
- Official name: 藤井川ダム（再）
- Location: Ibaraki Prefecture, Japan
- Coordinates: 36°26′08″N 140°21′32″E
- Construction began: 1991
- Opening date: 2009

Dam and spillways
- Height: 37.5 m (123 ft)
- Length: 90 m (300 ft)

Reservoir
- Total capacity: 4462 thousand cubic meters
- Catchment area: 70 sq. km
- Surface area: 38 hectares

Fujiigawa Dam (Japanese: 藤井川ダム（再）) is a gravity dam located in Ibaraki Prefecture in Japan. The dam is used for flood control, irrigation and water supply. The catchment area of the dam is 70 km^{2}. The dam impounds about 38 ha of land when full and can store 4462 thousand cubic meters of water. The construction of the dam was started on 1991 and completed in 2009.

== See also ==
- List of dams in Japan
