= Kozogawa Dam =

Dam in Ibaraki Prefecture, Japan

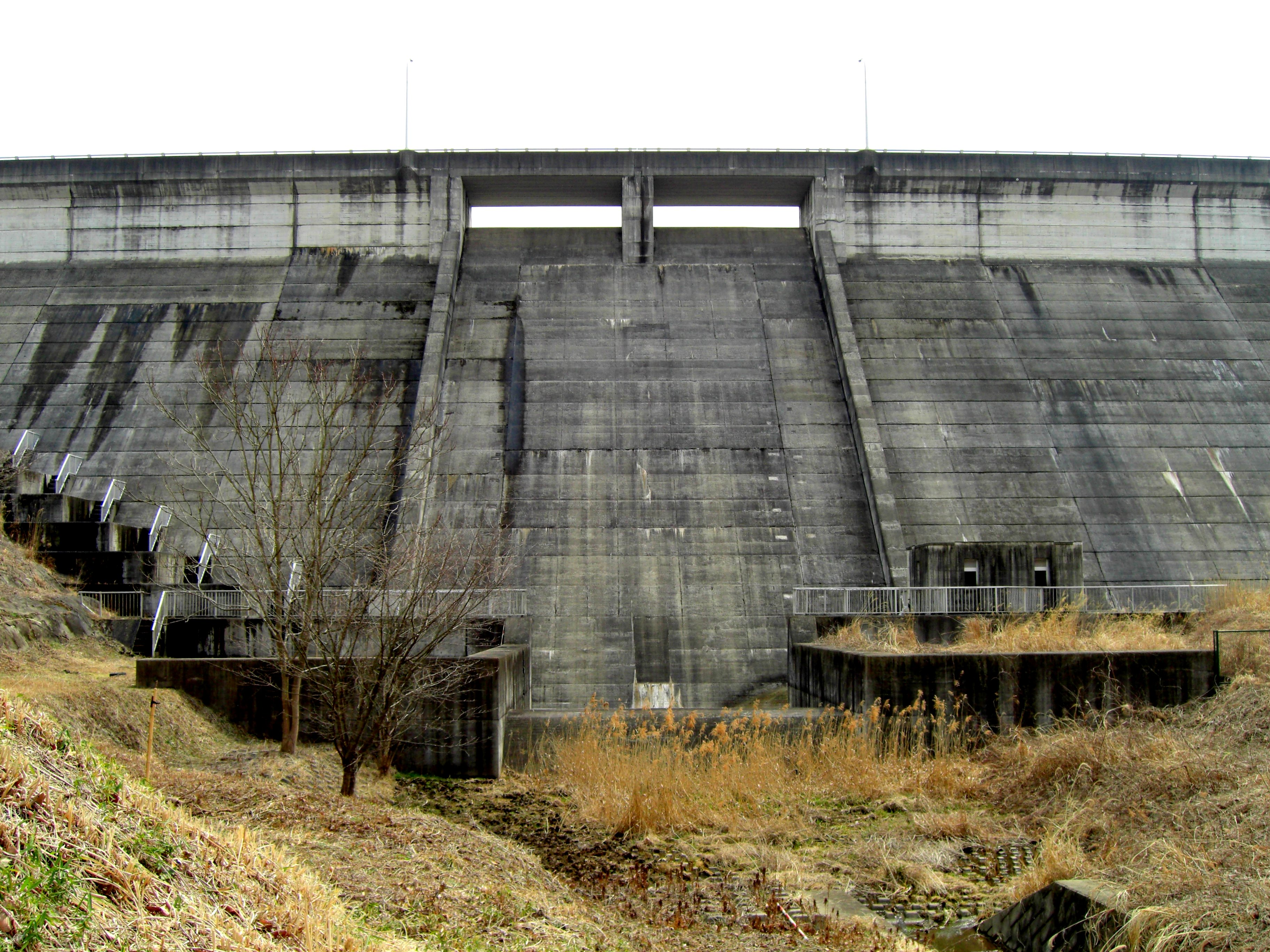

- Location within Ibaraki Prefecture Location within Japan
- Official name: 楮川ダム
- Location: Ibaraki Prefecture, Japan
- Coordinates: 36°25′16″N 140°23′43″E
- Construction began: 1980
- Opening date: 1985

Dam and spillways
- Height: 35 m (115 ft)
- Length: 364 m (1,194 ft)

Reservoir
- Total capacity: 1970 thousand cubic meters
- Catchment area: 0.3 sq. km
- Surface area: 20 hectares

Kozogawa Dam (Japanese: 楮川ダム) is a gravity dam located in Ibaraki Prefecture in Japan. The dam is used for water supply. The catchment area of the dam is 0.3 km^{2}. The dam impounds about 20 ha of land when full and can store 1970 thousand cubic meters of water. The construction of the dam was started on 1980 and completed in 1985.

== See also ==
- List of dams in Japan
