= Wachi Dam =

Dam in Kyoto Prefecture, Japan

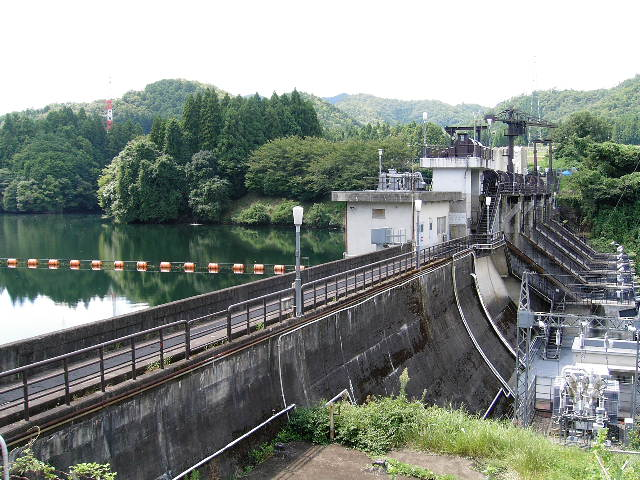

- Location within Japan
- Official name: 和知ダム
- Location: Kyoto Prefecture, Japan
- Coordinates: 35°15′08″N 135°25′00″E
- Construction began: 1961
- Opening date: 1968

Dam and spillways
- Height: 25.2 m (83 ft)
- Length: 141 m (463 ft)

Reservoir
- Total capacity: 5,119,000 m^{3} (180,800,000 cu ft)
- Catchment area: 573 km^{2} (221 sq mi)
- Surface area: 56 hectares (140 acres)

Wachi Dam (Japanese: 和知ダム) is a gravity dam located in Kyoto Prefecture in Japan. The dam is used for power production. The catchment area of the dam is 573 km^{2} (221 sq mi). The dam impounds about 56 ha (140 acres) of land when full and can store 5,119,000 m^{3} (180,800,000 cu ft) of water. The construction of the dam was started in 1961 and completed in 1968.

== See also ==
- List of dams in Japan
