= Nishigatani Dam =

Dam in Kyoto Prefecture, Japan

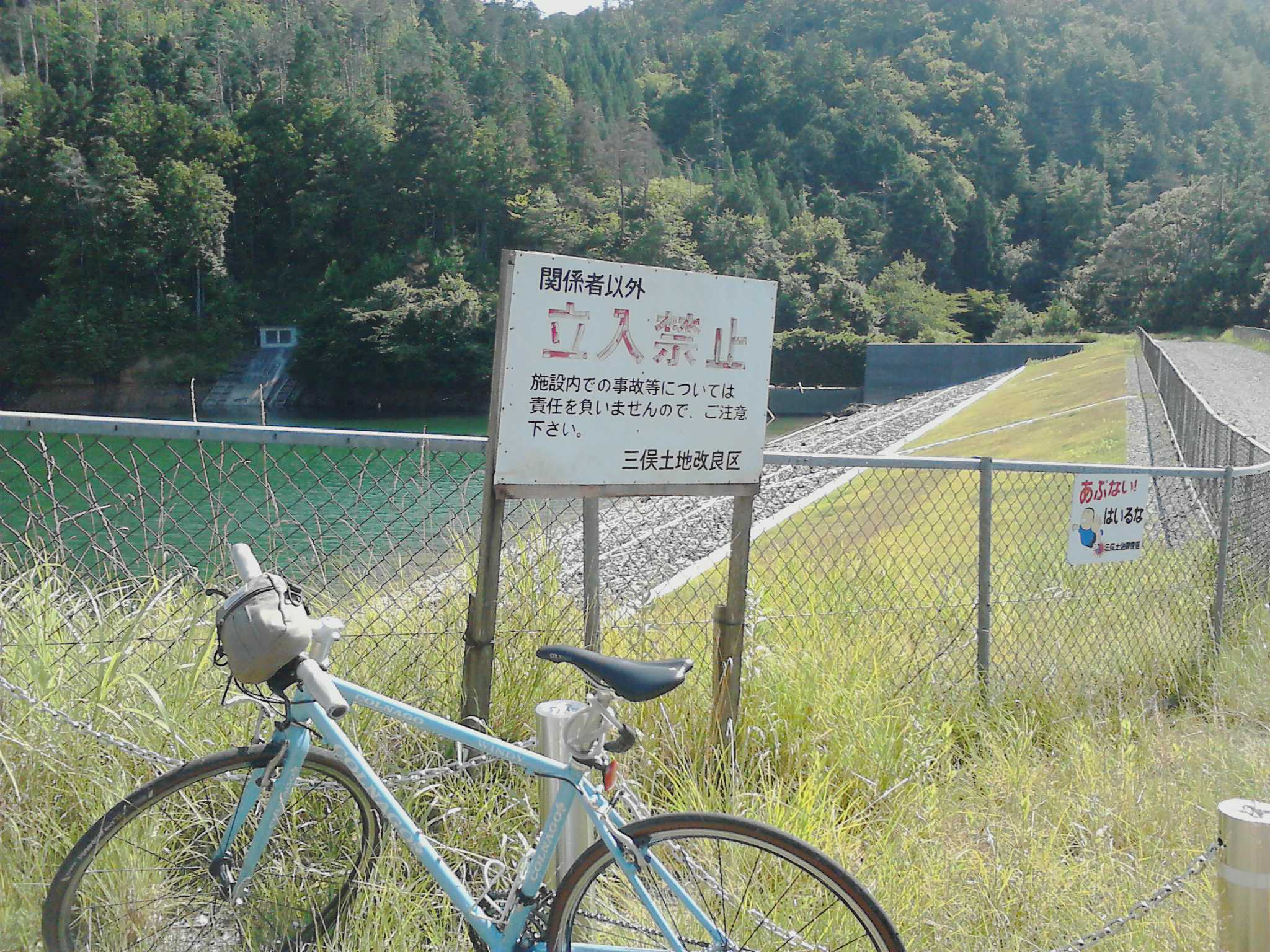

- Location within Japan
- Official name: 西ヶ谷ダム（再）
- Location: Kyoto Prefecture, Japan
- Coordinates: 35°5′18″N 135°36′08″E
- Construction began: 1993
- Opening date: 1996

Dam and spillways
- Height: 24.8 m (81 ft)
- Length: 97.1 m (319 ft)

Reservoir
- Total capacity: 250,000 m^{3} (8,800,000 cu ft)
- Catchment area: 2 km^{2} (0.77 sq mi)
- Surface area: 3 hectares (7.4 acres)

Nishigatani Dam (Japanese: 西ヶ谷ダム（再）) is an earthfill dam located in Kyoto Prefecture in Japan. The dam is used for irrigation. The catchment area of the dam is 2 km^{2}. The dam impounds about 3 ha of land when full and can store 250 thousand cubic meters of water. The construction of the dam was started in 1993 and completed in 1996.

== See also ==
- List of dams in Japan
