= Toyotomi Yosui-ike Dam =

Dam in Kyoto Prefecture, Japan

Toyotomi Yosui-ike
- Location within Japan
- Official name: 豊富用水池
- Location: Kyoto Prefecture, Japan
- Coordinates: 35°15′13″N 135°4′08″E
- Opening date: 1952

Dam and spillways
- Height: 28.6 m (94 ft)
- Length: 225 m (738 ft)

Reservoir
- Total capacity: 945,000 m^{3} (33,400,000 cu ft)
- Catchment area: 3.9 km^{2} (1.5 sq mi)
- Surface area: 11 hectares (27 acres)

Toyotomi Yosui-ike (Japanese: 豊富用水池) is an earthfill dam located in Kyoto Prefecture in Japan. The dam is used for irrigation. The catchment area of the dam is 3.9 km^{2}. The dam impounds about 11 ha of land when full and can store 945 thousand cubic meters of water. The construction of the dam was completed in 1952.

== See also ==
- List of dams in Japan
