= Minamishiio Choseichi Dam =

Dam in Ibaraki Prefecture, Japan

Minamishiio Choseichi
- Location within Ibaraki Prefecture Location within Japan
- Official name: 南椎尾調整池
- Location: Ibaraki Prefecture, Japan
- Coordinates: 36°14′26″N 140°4′14″E
- Construction began: 1983
- Opening date: 1991

Dam and spillways
- Height: 27.4 m (90 ft)
- Length: 400 m (1,300 ft)

Reservoir
- Total capacity: 560 thousand cubic meters
- Catchment area: 1.3 sq. km
- Surface area: 12 hectares

Minamishiio Choseichi (Japanese: 南椎尾調整池) is a rockfill dam located in Ibaraki Prefecture in Japan. The dam is used for irrigation. The catchment area of the dam is 1.3 km^{2}. The dam impounds about 12 ha of land when full and can store 560 thousand cubic meters of water. The construction of the dam was started on 1983 and completed in 1991.

== See also ==
- List of dams in Japan
