= Tomisaka-ike Dam =

Dam in Kyoto Prefecture, Japan

Tomisaka-ike
- Location within Japan
- Official name: 富栄池
- Location: Kyoto Prefecture, Japan
- Coordinates: 35°5′37″N 135°33′33″E
- Construction began: 1993
- Opening date: 1997

Dam and spillways
- Height: 19.5 m (64 ft)
- Length: 161.4 m (530 ft)

Reservoir
- Total capacity: 180,000 m^{3} (6,400,000 cu ft)
- Catchment area: 1 km^{2} (0.39 sq mi)
- Surface area: 3 hectares (7.4 acres)

Tomisaka-ike (Japanese: 富栄池) is an earthfill dam located in Kyoto Prefecture in Japan. The dam is used for irrigation. The catchment area of the dam is 1 km^{2}. The dam impounds about 3 ha of land when full and can store 180 thousand cubic meters of water. The construction of the dam was started on 1993 and completed in 1997.

== See also ==
- List of dams in Japan
