= Yuragawa Dam =

Dam in Kyoto Prefecture, Japan

- Location within Japan
- Official name: 由良川ダム
- Location: Kyoto Prefecture, Japan
- Coordinates: 35°16′36″N 135°20′00″E
- Construction began: 1922
- Opening date: 1924

Dam and spillways
- Height: 15.2 m (50 ft)
- Length: 89.7 m (294 ft)

Reservoir
- Total capacity: 958,000 m^{3} (33,800,000 cu ft)
- Catchment area: 595 km^{2} (230 sq mi)
- Surface area: 19 hectares (47 acres)

Yuragawa Dam (Japanese: 由良川ダム) is a gravity dam located in Kyoto Prefecture in Japan. The dam is used for power production. The catchment area of the dam is 595 km^{2}. The dam impounds about 19 ha of land when full and can store 958 thousand cubic meters of water. The construction of the dam was started on 1922 and completed in 1924.

== See also ==
- List of dams in Japan
