= Ohura Dam =

Dam in Saga Prefecture, Japan

- Location within Japan
- Location: Saga Prefecture, Japan
- Coordinates: 32°58′03″N 130°10′07″E
- Construction began: 1970
- Opening date: 1987

Dam and spillways
- Height: 45 m (148 ft)
- Length: 160 m (520 ft)

Reservoir
- Total capacity: 730,000 m^{3} (26,000,000 cu ft)
- Catchment area: 1.8 km^{2} (0.69 sq mi)
- Surface area: 7 hectares (17 acres)

Ohura Dam is an earthen dam located in Saga Prefecture in Japan. The dam is used for irrigation. The catchment area of the dam is 1.8 km^{2}. The dam impounds about 7 ha of land when full and can store 730 thousand cubic meters of water. The construction of the dam was started on 1970 and completed in 1987.
