= Kyuragi Dam =

Dam in Saga Prefecture, Japan

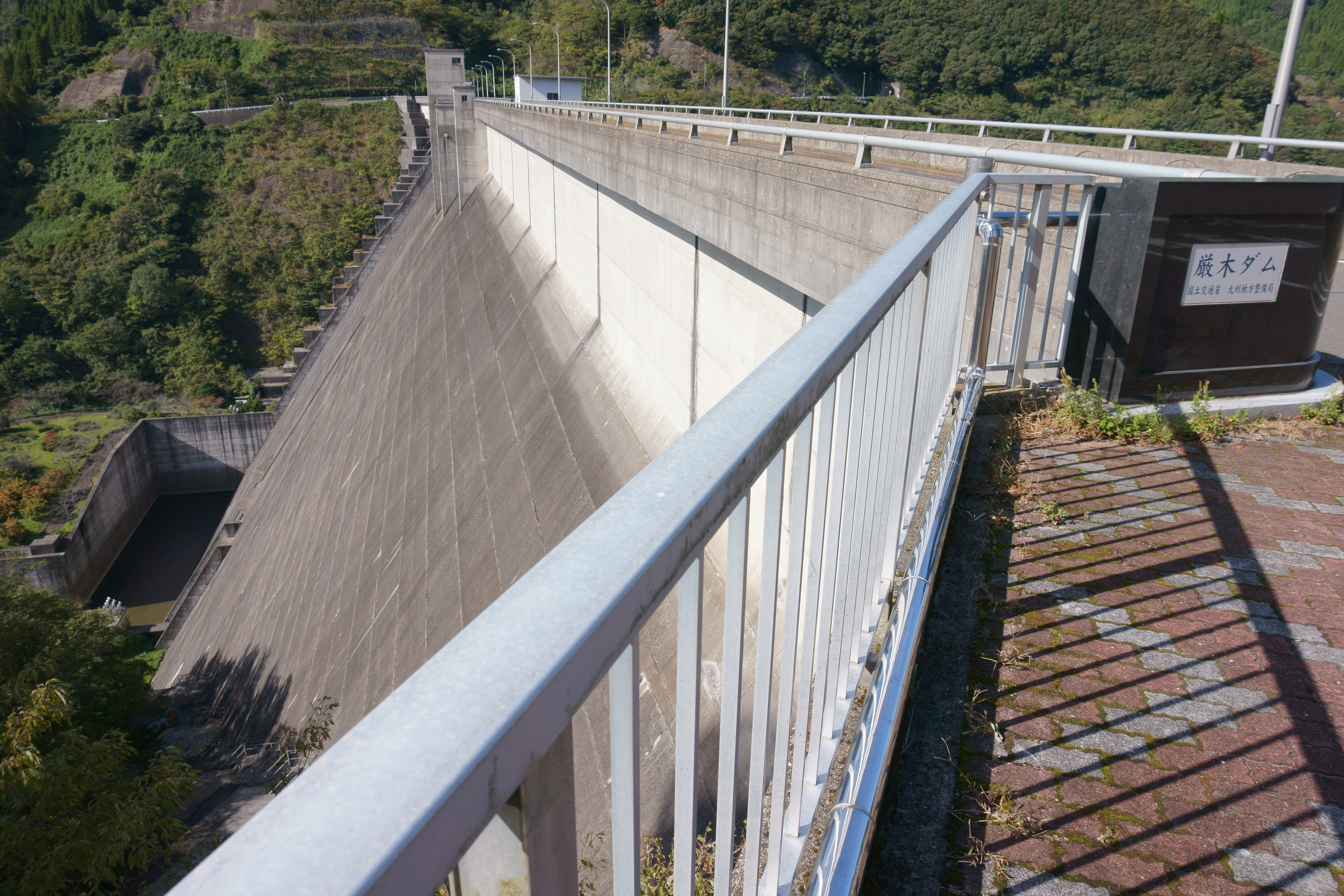

- Location within Japan
- Location: Saga Prefecture, Japan
- Coordinates: 33°19′41″N 130°6′08″E
- Construction began: 1973
- Opening date: 1986

Dam and spillways
- Height: 117 m (384 ft)
- Length: 390.4 m (1,281 ft)

Reservoir
- Total capacity: 13600 thousand cubic meters
- Catchment area: 33.7 sq. km
- Surface area: 42 hectares

Kyuragi Dam is a gravity dam located in Saga Prefecture in Japan. The dam is used for water supply, irrigation and power production. The catchment area of the dam is 33.7 km^{2}. The dam impounds about 42 ha of land when full and can store 13600 thousand cubic meters of water. The construction of the dam was started on 1973 and completed in 1986.
