= Fukaura Dam =

Dam in Saga Prefecture, Japan

- Location within Japan
- Interactive map of Fukaura Dam
- Location: Saga Prefecture, Japan
- Coordinates: 33°8′17″N 130°6′11″E
- Construction began: 1977
- Opening date: 1989

Dam and spillways
- Height: 26 m (85 ft)
- Length: 121 m (397 ft)

Reservoir
- Total capacity: 27 thousand cubic meters
- Catchment area: 1.2 sq. km
- Surface area: 1 hectares

Fukaura Dam is a concrete gravity dam located in Saga Prefecture in Japan. The dam is used for flood control. The catchment area of the dam is 1.2 km^{2}. The dam impounds about 1 ha of land when full and can store 27 thousand cubic meters of water. The construction of the dam was started on 1977 and completed in 1989.
