= Japanese destroyer Shigure =

Two destroyers of the Imperial Japanese Navy have been named Shigure:

- Japanese destroyer Shigure (1906), a Kamikaze-class destroyer launched in 1906 and scrapped in 1924
- Japanese destroyer Shigure (1935), a Shiratsuyu-class destroyer launched in 1935 and sunk in 1945
