= Nakakoba Dam =

Dam in Saga Prefecture, Japan

- Location within Japan
- Location: Saga Prefecture, Japan
- Coordinates: 33°2′30″N 130°4′13″E
- Construction began: 1978
- Opening date: 2007

Dam and spillways
- Height: 69.5 m (228 ft)
- Length: 265 m (869 ft)

Reservoir
- Total capacity: 6800 thousand cubic meters
- Catchment area: 13.5 sq. km
- Surface area: 31 hectares

Nakakoba Dam is a concrete gravity dam located in Saga Prefecture in Japan. The dam is used for flood control, water supply and power production. The catchment area of the dam is 13.5 km^{2}. The dam impounds about 31 ha of land when full and can store 6800 thousand cubic meters of water. The construction of the dam was started on 1978 and completed in 2007.
