= Kogo-ike Dam =

Dam in Saga Prefecture, Japan

Kogo-ike
- Location within Japan
- Location: Saga Prefecture, Japan
- Coordinates: 33°19′57″N 130°19′49″E
- Opening date: 1948

Dam and spillways
- Height: 16 m (52 ft)
- Length: 100 m (330 ft)

Reservoir
- Total capacity: 317 thousand cubic meters
- Surface area: 5 hectares

Kogo-ike is an earthen dam located in Saga Prefecture in Japan. The dam is used for agriculture. The dam impounds about 5 ha of land when full and can store 317 thousand cubic meters of water. The construction of the dam was completed in 1948.
