= Kishikawa Bosai Dam =

Dam in Saga Prefecture, Japan

- Location within Japan
- Location: Saga Prefecture, Japan
- Coordinates: 33°19′00″N 130°7′30″E
- Opening date: 1962

Dam and spillways
- Height: 26.5 m (87 ft)
- Length: 66 m (217 ft)

Reservoir
- Total capacity: 330 thousand cubic meters
- Catchment area: sq. km
- Surface area: 4 hectares

Kishikawa Bosai Dam is a concrete gravity dam located in Saga Prefecture in Japan. The dam is used for flood control. The catchment area of the dam is km^{2}. The dam impounds about 4 ha of land when full and can store 330 thousand cubic meters of water. The construction of the dam was started on and completed in 1962.
