= Furukoba Dam =

Dam in Saga Prefecture, Japan

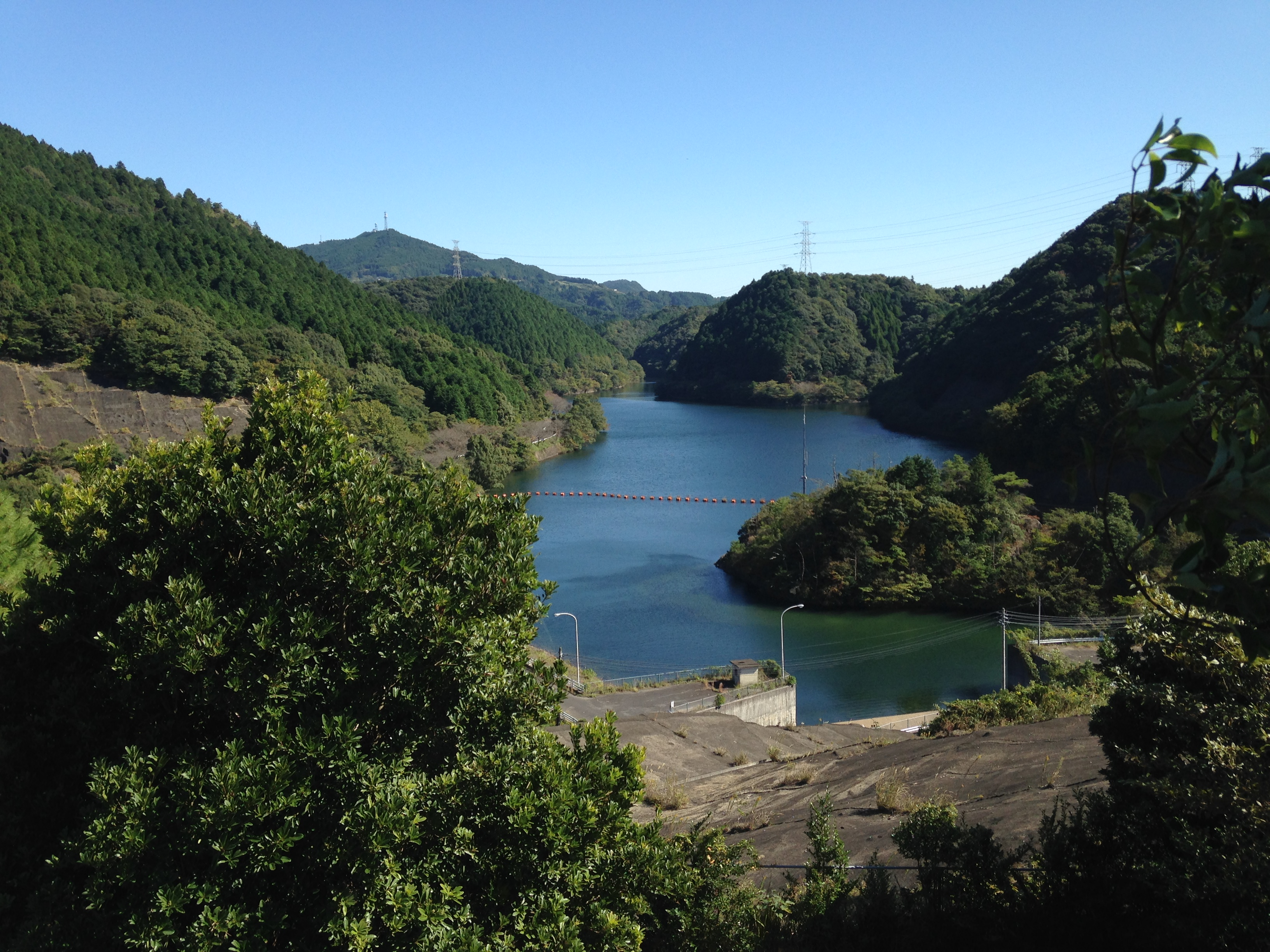

- Location within Japan
- Interactive map of Furukoba Dam
- Location: Saga Prefecture, Japan
- Coordinates: 33°10′03″N 129°54′41″E
- Construction began: 1973
- Opening date: 1998

Dam and spillways
- Height: 26.8 m (88 ft)
- Length: 193 m (633 ft)

Reservoir
- Total capacity: 1172 thousand cubic meters
- Catchment area: 2.5 sq. km
- Surface area: 14 hectares

Furukoba Dam is an earthen dam located in Saga Prefecture in Japan. The dam is used for agriculture and water supply. The catchment area of the dam is 2.5 km^{2}. The dam impounds about 14 ha of land when full and can store 1172 thousand cubic meters of water. The construction of the dam was started in 1973 and completed in 1998.
