= Hanatori Tameike Dam =

Dam in Saga Prefecture, Japan

Hanatori Tameike dam
- Location within Japan
- Interactive map of Hanatori Tameike dam
- Location: Saga Prefecture, Japan
- Coordinates: 33°3′32″N 130°7′08″E
- Opening date: 1969

Dam and spillways
- Height: 22.5 m (74 ft)
- Length: 176 m (577 ft)

Reservoir
- Total capacity: 244 thousand cubic meters
- Catchment area: 0.1 sq. km
- Surface area: 3 hectares

Hanatori Tameike dam is an earth-fill dam located in Saga Prefecture in Japan. The dam is used for agriculture. The catchment area of the dam is 0.1 km^{2}. The dam impounds about 3 ha of land when full and can store 244 thousand cubic meters of water. The construction of the dam was completed in 1969.
