= Kitaura Tameike Dam =

Dam in Saga Prefecture, Japan

Kitaura Tameike
- Location within Japan
- Location: Saga Prefecture, Japan
- Coordinates: 33°18′29″N 130°12′32″E
- Opening date: 1948

Dam and spillways
- Height: 17.9 m (59 ft)
- Length: 192 m (630 ft)

Reservoir
- Total capacity: 368 thousand cubic meters
- Surface area: 4 hectares

Kitaura Tameike is an earthen dam located in Saga Prefecture in Japan. The dam is used for agriculture. The dam impounds about 4 ha of land when full and can store 368 thousand cubic meters of water. The construction of the dam was completed in 1948.
