= Kawachi Bosai Dam =

Dam in Saga Prefecture, Japan

- Location within Japan
- Interactive map of Kawachi Bosai Dam
- Location: Saga Prefecture, Japan
- Coordinates: 33°24′24″N 130°29′21″E
- Opening date: 1971

Dam and spillways
- Height: 35 m (115 ft)
- Length: 153 m (502 ft)

Reservoir
- Total capacity: 1195 thousand cubic meters
- Catchment area: 4.5 sq. km
- Surface area: 12 hectares

Kawachi Bosai Dam is an earthen dam located in Saga Prefecture in Japan. The dam is used for agriculture. The catchment area of the dam is 4.5 km^{2}. The dam impounds about 12 ha of land when full and can store 1195 thousand cubic meters of water. The construction of the dam was started on and completed in 1971.
