= Murayamashimo Dam =

Dam in Tokyo Prefecture, Japan

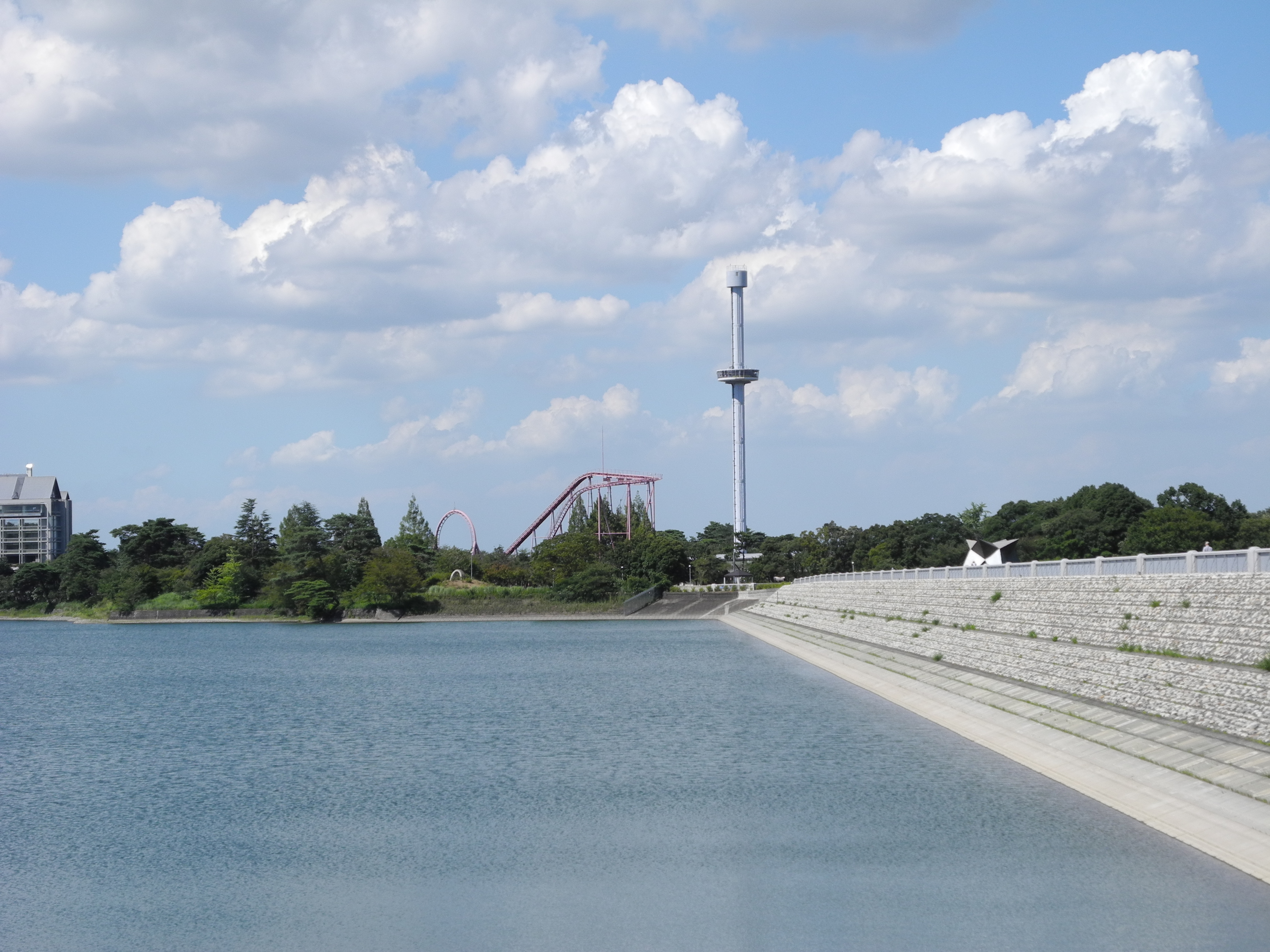
- Location: Tokyo, Japan
- Coordinates: 35°45′48″N 139°26′25″E
- Construction began: 2003
- Opening date: 2008

Dam and spillways
- Type of dam: Embankment
- Impounds: Tama River
- Height: 32.6 m (107 ft)
- Length: 610 m (2,000 ft)

Reservoir
- Creates: Tama Lake
- Total capacity: 12,140,000 m^{3} (429,000,000 cu ft)
- Catchment area: 2 km^{2} (0.77 sq mi)
- Surface area: 111 hectares

Murayamashimo Dam is an earth-fill dam located in Tokyo prefecture in Japan. The dam is used to collect drinking water for Tokyo. The catchment area of the dam is 2 km^{2}. The dam impounds about 111 ha of land when full and can store 12.14 million cubic meters of water. The construction of the dam was started on 2003 and completed in 2008.

The reservoir is divided into two parts, namely Upper Murayama which lies on the western side and Lower Murayama which lies on the east side. They are interconnected with pipes. The dam stores the water from Tama river from two intakes and conveys to the Higashi Murayama and Sakai water purification plant.
