= Chibusa Dam =

Dam in Tokyo Prefecture, Japan

- Location within Japan
- Interactive map of Chibusa Dam
- Location: Tokyo Prefecture, Japan
- Coordinates: 26°38′48″N 142°9′44″E
- Construction began: 1971
- Opening date: 1973

Dam and spillways
- Height: 16.5 m (54 ft)
- Length: 64 m (210 ft)

Reservoir
- Total capacity: 35,000 m^{3} (1,200,000 cu ft)
- Surface area: 1 hectare

Chibusa Dam is a gravity dam located in Tokyo prefecture in Japan. The dam is used for water supply. The dam impounds about 1 ha of land when full and can store 35 thousand cubic meters of water. The construction of the dam was started in 1971 and completed in 1973.
