= List of dams in Wakayama Prefecture =

The following is a list of dams in Wakayama Prefecture, Japan.

== List ==
Name	Location	Started	Opened	Height	Length	Image	DiJ number
Futagawa Dam				67.4 m (221 ft)			1647
Hirogawa Dam				53.5 m (176 ft)			1648
Kirimegawa Dam		1991	2014	44.5 m (146 ft)			3131
Kodakumi Dam				35.9 m (118 ft)			1646
Komori Dam				34 m (112 ft)			1313
Nanairo Dam			1965	61 m (200 ft)			1312
Shichikawa Dam							
Tonoyama Dam				64.5 m (212 ft)			1644
Torinose Dam							
Tsubayama Dam		1966	1988	56.5 m (185 ft)			1649
Yamada Dam		1950	1957	34 m (112 ft)			1645

== See also ==
- Media related to Dams in Wakayama prefecture at Wikimedia Commons
