= Kasegawa Dam =

Dam in Saga Prefecture, Japan

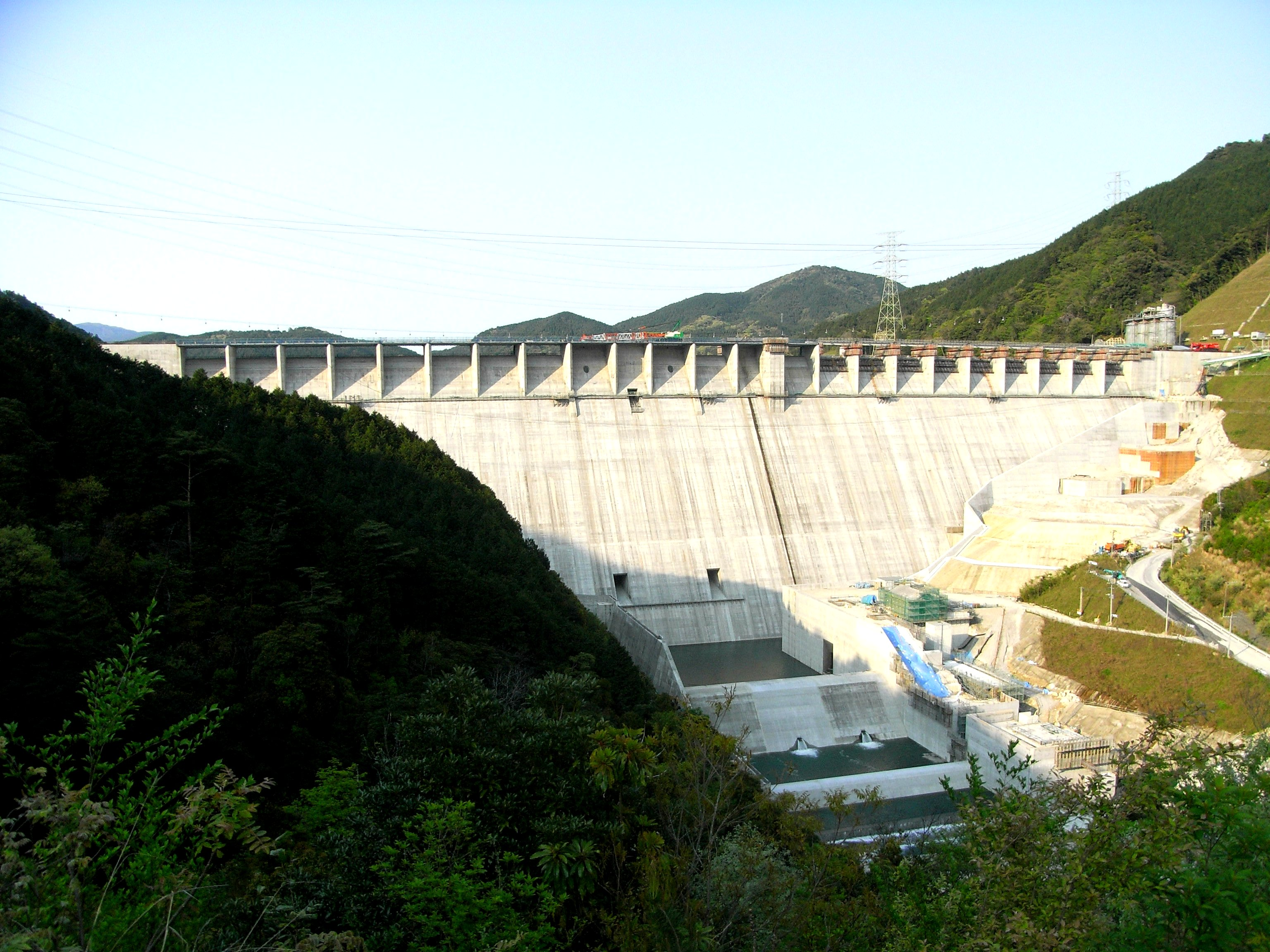

- Location within Japan
- Interactive map of Kasegawa Dam
- Location: Saga Prefecture, Japan
- Coordinates: 33°23′22″N 130°13′01″E
- Construction began: 1973
- Opening date: 2011

Dam and spillways
- Height: 97 m (318 ft)
- Length: 454.5 m (1,491 ft)

Reservoir
- Total capacity: 71000 thousand cubic meters
- Catchment area: 128.4 sq. km
- Surface area: 270 hectares

Kasegawa Dam is a concrete gravity dam located in Saga Prefecture in Japan. The dam is used for water supply, irrigation and power generation. The catchment area of the dam is 128.4 km^{2}. The dam impounds about 270 ha of land when full and can store 71000 thousand cubic meters of water. The construction of the dam was started on 1973 and completed in 2011.
