= List of dams in Shizuoka Prefecture =

The following is a list of dams in Shizuoka Prefecture, Japan.

== List ==
Name	Location	Started	Opened	Height	Length	Image	DiJ number
Akaishi Dam				58 m (190 ft)			1179
Akiba Dam		1954	1958				
Funagira Dam		1972	1977	24 m (79 ft)			1174
Haranoya Dam							
Hatanagi-I Dam		1957	1961	125 m (410 ft)			1168
Hatanagi-II Dam		1957	1961	69 m (226 ft)			1167
Higashifuji Dam				22 m (72 ft)			1172
Ikawa Dam		1957	1957	103.6 m (340 ft)			1162
Misakubo Dam		1967	1969	105 m (344 ft)	258 m (846 ft)		1171
Miyakodagawa Dam				55 m (180 ft)			1175
Nagashima Dam		2002		109 m (358 ft)			1178
Oigawa Dam		1934	1936	33.5 m (110 ft)			1153
Okuizumi Dam				44.5 m (146 ft)			1161
Okuno Dam		1989	1989	63 m (207 ft)			1176
Oma Dam				46.1 m (151 ft)			1155
Sakaigawa Dam				34.2 m (112 ft)			1157
Sakuma Dam		Sep 1956	23 Apr 1956	155.5 m (510 ft)			
Sasamagawa Dam		1955	1960	46.4 m (152 ft)			1166
Senzu Dam		1930	1935	64 m (210 ft)			1152
Shikago-zeki Dam							
Shiogo Dam		1958	1961	3.2 m (10 ft)			
Sumatagawa Dam				34.8 m (114 ft)			1154
Tashiro Dam		1928	1928	17.3 m (57 ft)			
Toyoka Dam							

== See also ==
- Media related to Dams in Shizuoka prefecture at Wikimedia Commons
