= Nanamagari Tameike Dam =

Dam in Saga Prefecture, Japan

Nanamagari Tameike
- Location within Japan
- Location: Saga Prefecture, Japan
- Coordinates: 33°1′51″N 130°7′19″E
- Opening date: 1973

Dam and spillways
- Height: 15.3 m (50 ft)
- Length: 133 m (436 ft)

Reservoir
- Total capacity: 69 thousand cubic meters
- Surface area: 1 hectares

Nanamagari Tameike is an earthen dam located in Saga Prefecture in Japan. The dam is used for agriculture. The dam impounds about 1 ha of land when full and can store 69 thousand cubic meters of water. The construction of the dam was completed in 1973.
