= Shiromaru Tyouseiti Dam =

Dam in Tokyo Prefecture, Japan

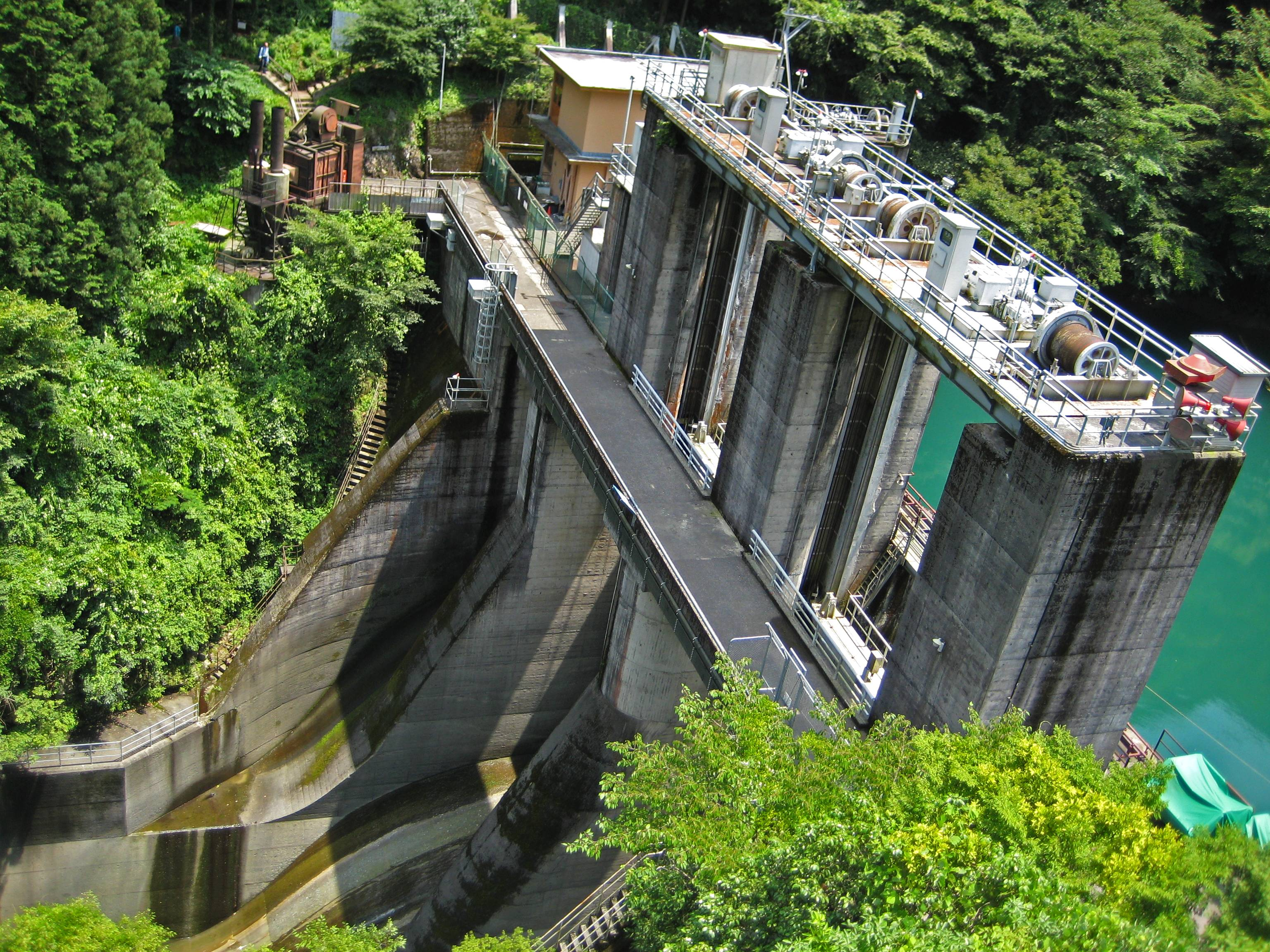

- Location within Japan
- Location: Tokyo Prefecture, Japan
- Coordinates: 35°48′40″N 139°7′27″E
- Construction began: 1957
- Opening date: 1962

Dam and spillways
- Type of dam: Gravity
- Impounds: Tama River
- Height: 30.3 m (99 ft)
- Length: 61 m (200 ft)

Reservoir
- Total capacity: 893,000 m^{3} (31,500,000 cu ft)
- Catchment area: 397 km^{2} (153 sq mi)
- Surface area: 9 hectares (22 acres)

Shiromaru Tyouseiti Dam is a gravity dam located in Tokyo prefecture in Japan. The dam is used for power production. The catchment area of the dam is 397 km^{2}. The dam impounds about 9 ha of land when full and can store 893 thousand cubic meters of water. The construction of the dam was started on 1957 and completed in 1962.
