= Karitate Dam =

Dam in Saga Prefecture, Japan

- Location within Japan
- Interactive map of Karitate Dam
- Location: Saga Prefecture, Japan
- Coordinates: 33°10′54″N 129°55′46″E
- Construction began: 1982
- Opening date: 2001

Dam and spillways
- Height: 28.4 m (93 ft)
- Length: 177 m (581 ft)

Reservoir
- Total capacity: 1330 thousand cubic meters
- Catchment area: 2.3 sq. km
- Surface area: 15 hectares

Karitate Dam is a concrete gravity dam located in Saga Prefecture in Japan. The dam is used for flood control and water supply. The catchment area of the dam is 2.3 km^{2}. The dam impounds about 15 ha of land when full and can store 1330 thousand cubic meters of water. The construction of the dam was started on 1982 and completed in 2001.
