= Sasahara Tameike Dam =

Dam in Saga Prefecture, Japan

Sasahara Tameike dam
- Location within Japan
- Location: Saga Prefecture, Japan
- Coordinates: 33°2′34″N 130°7′17″E
- Opening date: 1970

Dam and spillways
- Height: 26.3 m (86 ft)
- Length: 175 m (574 ft)

Reservoir
- Total capacity: 118,000 m^{3} (4,200,000 cu ft)
- Catchment area: 6.2 km^{2} (2.4 sq mi)
- Surface area: 1 hectare (2.5 acres)

Sasahara Tameike Dam is an earthen dam located in Saga Prefecture in Japan. The dam is used for irrigation. The catchment area of the dam is 6.2 km^{2}. The dam impounds about 1 ha of land when full and can store 118 thousand cubic meters of water. The construction of the dam was started on and completed in 1970.
