= List of dams in Osaka Prefecture =

The following is a list of dams in Osaka Prefecture, Japan.

== List ==
Name	Location	Started	Opened	Height	Length	Image	DiJ number
Aigaeri Dam				33.2 m (109 ft)			1430
Aigawa Dam				76.5 m (251 ft)			1438
Eiraku Dam				40 m (130 ft)			1431
Horigo Dam				45.4 m (149 ft)	130 m (430 ft)		1432
Minohgawa Dam				47 m (154 ft)			1437
Sayamaike Dam							
Takihata Dam		1981		62 m (203 ft)	120.5 m (395 ft)		1436
Teragaike Dam				15 m (49 ft)			1433

== See also ==
- Media related to Dams in Osaka prefecture at Wikimedia Commons
