= Iwayagawauchi Dam =

Dam in Saga Prefecture, Japan

- Location within Japan
- Interactive map of Iwayagawauchi Dam
- Location: Saga Prefecture, Japan
- Coordinates: 33°4′03″N 129°58′59″E
- Construction began: 1967
- Opening date: 1973

Dam and spillways
- Height: 59.5 m (195 ft)
- Length: 192 m (630 ft)

Reservoir
- Total capacity: 2500 thousand cubic meters
- Catchment area: 10.7 sq. km
- Surface area: 14 hectares

Iwayagawauchi Dam is a concrete gravity dam used for flood control in Japan's Saga Prefecture. The catchment area of the dam is 10.7 km^{2}. It impounds about 14 ha of land when full, and can store 2500 thousand cubic meters of water.

Dam construction lasted form 1967 until 1973. In November 2024, a Godzilla mural was pressure washed on the Dam's side.
