= Kyuragigawa Choseichi Dam =

Dam in Saga Prefecture, Japan

Kyuragigawa Choseichi dam
- Location within Japan
- Location: Saga Prefecture, Japan
- Coordinates: 33°20′56″N 130°6′52″E
- Construction began: 1918
- Opening date: 1930

Dam and spillways
- Height: 15.5 m (51 ft)
- Length: 59.8 m (196 ft)

Reservoir
- Total capacity: 84 thousand cubic meters
- Catchment area: 20.9 sq. km
- Surface area: 1 hectares

Kyuragigawa Choseichi dam is a concrete gravity dam located in Saga Prefecture in Japan. The dam is used for power production. The catchment area of the dam is 20.9 km^{2}. The dam impounds about 1 ha of land when full and can store 84 thousand cubic meters of water. The construction of the dam was started on 1918 and completed in 1930.
