= Tenzan Dam =

Dam in Saga Prefecture, Japan

- Location within Japan
- Location: Saga Prefecture, Japan
- Coordinates: 33°20′32″N 130°7′56″E
- Construction began: 1978
- Opening date: 1986

Dam and spillways
- Height: 69 m (226 ft)
- Length: 380 m (1,250 ft)

Reservoir
- Total capacity: 3,270,000 m^{3} (115,000,000 cu ft)
- Catchment area: 0.8 km^{2} (0.31 sq mi)
- Surface area: 14 hectares (35 acres)

Tenzan Dam is a rockfill dam located in Saga Prefecture in Japan. The dam is used for power production. The catchment area of the dam is 0.8 km^{2}. The dam impounds about 14 ha of land when full and can store 3270 thousand cubic meters of water. The construction of the dam was started on 1978 and completed in 1986.
