= Hinomine Dam =

Dam in Saga Prefecture, Japan

- Location within Japan
- Interactive map of Hinomine Dam
- Location: Saga Prefecture, Japan
- Coordinates: 33°10′59″N 129°55′37″E
- Construction began: 1982
- Opening date: 2001

Dam and spillways
- Height: 28.4 m (93 ft)
- Length: 112 m (367 ft)

Reservoir
- Total capacity: 460 thousand cubic meters
- Catchment area: 0.4 sq. km
- Surface area: 7 hectares

Hinomine Dam is a concrete gravity dam located in Saga Prefecture in Japan. The dam is used for food water control and water supply. The catchment area of the dam is 0.4 km^{2}. The dam impounds about 7 ha of land when full and can store 460 thousand cubic meters of water. The construction of the dam was started on 1982 and completed in 2001.
