= Niwaki Dam =

Dam in Saga Prefecture, Japan

- Location within Japan
- Location: Saga Prefecture, Japan
- Coordinates: 33°7′33″N 129°57′35″E
- Construction began: 1985
- Opening date: 1994

Dam and spillways
- Height: 26.2 m (86 ft)
- Length: 130 m (430 ft)

Reservoir
- Total capacity: 600,000 m^{3} (21,000,000 cu ft)
- Catchment area: 1.2 km^{2} (0.46 sq mi)
- Surface area: 9 hectares (22 acres)

Niwaki Dam is a concrete gravity dam located in Saga Prefecture in Japan. The dam is used for irrigation. The catchment area of the dam is 1.2 km^{2}. The dam impounds about 9 ha of land when full and can store 600 thousand cubic meters of water. The construction of the dam was started on 1985 and completed in 1994.
