= Motobe Dam =

Dam in Saga Prefecture, Japan

- Location within Japan
- Location: Saga Prefecture, Japan
- Coordinates: 33°16′00″N 130°0′34″E
- Construction began: 1979
- Opening date: 1988

Dam and spillways
- Height: 42.1 m (138 ft)
- Length: 130 m (430 ft)

Reservoir
- Total capacity: 1140 thousand cubic meters
- Catchment area: 2.3 sq. km
- Surface area: 8 hectares

Motobe Dam is a concrete gravity dam located in Saga Prefecture in Japan. The dam is used for flood control and water supply. The catchment area of the dam is 2.3 km^{2}. The dam impounds about 8 ha of land when full and can store 1140 thousand cubic meters of water. The construction of the dam was started on 1979 and completed in 1988.
