= Ara-zutsumi Dam =

Dam in Tokyo Prefecture, Japan

- Location within Japan
- Interactive map of Ara-zutsumi Dam
- Location: Tokyo Prefecture, Japan
- Coordinates: 33°4′02″N 139°49′28″E
- Construction began: 1933
- Opening date: 1934

Dam and spillways
- Type of dam: Embankment
- Height: 17 m (56 ft)
- Length: 44 m (144 ft)

Reservoir
- Total capacity: 25,000 m^{3} (880,000 cu ft)
- Catchment area: 0.8 km^{2} (0.31 sq mi)

Ara-zutsumi Dam is an earthfill dam located in Tokyo prefecture in Japan. The dam is used for irrigation. The catchment area of the dam is 0.8 km^{2}. The reservoir can store 25 thousand cubic meters of water when full. The construction of the dam was started on 1933 and completed in 1934.
