= Banzai Tameike Dam =

Dam in Saga Prefecture, Japan

Banzai Tameike
- Location within Japan
- Interactive map of Banzai Tameike
- Location: Saga Prefecture, Japan
- Coordinates: 33°1′54″N 130°4′47″E
- Opening date: 1973

Dam and spillways
- Height: 17.5 m (57 ft)
- Length: 128 m (420 ft)

Reservoir
- Total capacity: 113 thousand cubic meters
- Catchment area: 0.6 sq. km
- Surface area: 2 hectares

Banzai Tameike Dam is an earthen dam located in Saga Prefecture in Japan. The dam is used for agriculture. The catchment area of the dam is 0.6 km^{2}. The dam impounds about 2 ha of land when full and can store 113 thousand cubic meters of water. The construction of the dam was completed in 1973.
