= Fujinohira Dam =

Dam in Saga Prefecture, Japan

- Location within Japan
- Interactive map of Fujinohira Dam
- Location: Saga Prefecture, Japan
- Coordinates: 33°27′52″N 129°53′08″E
- Construction began: 1990
- Opening date: 2002

Dam and spillways
- Height: 58.4 m (192 ft)
- Length: 296.2 m (972 ft)

Reservoir
- Total capacity: 3575 thousand cubic meters
- Catchment area: 15.6 sq. km
- Surface area: 21 hectares

Fujinohira Dam is a rockfill dam located in Saga Prefecture in Japan. The dam is used for agriculture. The catchment area of the dam is 15.6 km^{2}. The dam impounds about 21 ha of land when full and can store 3575 thousand cubic meters of water. The construction of the dam was started on 1990 and completed in 2002.
