= Amagase Dam (Saga) =

Dam in Saga Prefecture, Japan

- Location within Japan
- Interactive map of Amagase Dam
- Location: Saga Prefecture, Japan
- Coordinates: 33°14′58″N 130°6′26″E
- Construction began: 1972
- Opening date: 1982

Dam and spillways
- Height: 39.4 m (129 ft)
- Length: 270 m (890 ft)

Reservoir
- Total capacity: 532 thousand cubic meters
- Catchment area: 1.6 sq. km
- Surface area: 6 hectares

Amagase Dam is an earthen dam located in Saga Prefecture in Japan. The dam is used for agriculture. The catchment area of the dam is 1.6 km^{2}. The dam impounds about 6 ha of land when full and can store 532 thousand cubic meters of water. The construction of the dam was started on 1972 and completed in 1982.
