= Ryumon Dam =

Dam in Saga Prefecture, Japan

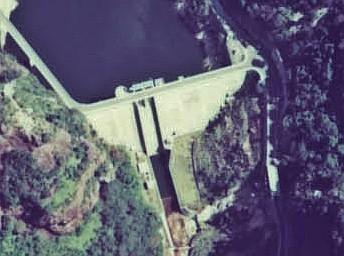

- Location within Japan
- Location: Saga Prefecture, Japan
- Coordinates: 33°12′43″N 129°52′41″E
- Construction began: 1968
- Opening date: 1975

Dam and spillways
- Height: 42.2 m (138 ft)
- Length: 150 m (490 ft)

Reservoir
- Total capacity: 2,350,000 m^{3} (83,000,000 cu ft)
- Catchment area: 3.2 km^{2} (1.2 sq mi)
- Surface area: 16 hectares (40 acres)

Ryumon Dam is a concrete gravity dam located in Saga Prefecture in Japan. The dam is used for water supply. The catchment area of the dam is 3.2 km^{2}. The dam impounds about 16 ha of land when full and can store 2350 thousand cubic meters of water. The construction of the dam was started in 1968 and completed in 1975.
