= List of dams in Nagasaki Prefecture =

The following is a list of dams in Nagasaki Prefecture, Japan.

== List ==
Name	Location	Height (metres)	Dams in Japan number
Aokata Dam		27.5	2637
Bessho Dam		19.3	2613
Chika Dam			
Enaga Dam		29.7	2624
Fuefuki Dam		59.8	3182
Fukue Dam		21.6	2621
Hajino Dam		31.5	2634
Hongochi Kobu Dam		18.8	
Ikiriki Dam		41.7	2648
Isanoura Dam		29.7	2644
Katsumoto Dam		31	2636
Kayaze Dam			
Kechi Dam		29	2619
Kogakura Dam			
Komoda Dam			
Konokawa		25.2	3602
Konoura Dam		51	2615
Kora Dam			
Kozone Dam			
Kubuki Dam		33.7	2646
Kurohama Dam		28.6	2629
Mehoro Dam		40	2651
Minotsubo Dam		36.7	2643
Miyazaki Dam		27	2633
Nagayo Dam		36	2630
Nakao Dam		40	2649
Nakayama Dam		24.5	2632
Narumi Dam		53.5	2641
Nita Dam		33.4	2625
Nonogawa Dam		24	2642
Ogawara Dam			
Sakuragawa Dam		33.9	3218
Shigeshiki Dam			
Shikao Dam			
Shikimi Dam		45.5	2628
Shimonohara Dam			
Soto Dam (Nagasaki Prefecture)		34	2601
Takahama Dam		35	3051
Takashima Kaicho Dam		29.9	3022
Tōda Dam		38.2	2626
Tsuzura Dam		21.6	3095
Uchiyami Dam		17.9	2614
Uku Dam		29.4	2631
Umenoki Dam		33.4	2622
Uranokawa Dam		35.9	2982
Yukinoura Dam		44	2618

== See also ==
- Media related to Dams in Nagasaki prefecture at Wikimedia Commons
