= Yahazu Dam =

Dam in Saga Prefecture, Japan

- Location within Japan
- Location: Saga Prefecture, Japan
- Coordinates: 33°8′33″N 129°57′01″E
- Construction began: 1981
- Opening date: 1993

Dam and spillways
- Height: 32.5 m (107 ft)
- Length: 199 m (653 ft)

Reservoir
- Total capacity: 1,390,000 m^{3} (49,000,000 cu ft)
- Catchment area: 2.1 km^{2} (0.81 sq mi)
- Surface area: 13 hectares (32 acres)

Yahazu Dam is a gravity dam located in Saga Prefecture in Japan. The dam is used for irrigation and water supply. The catchment area of the dam is 2.1 km^{2}. The dam impounds about 13 ha of land when full and can store 1390 thousand cubic meters of water. The construction of the dam was started on 1981 and completed in 1993.
