= Yokotake Dam =

Dam in Saga Prefecture, Japan

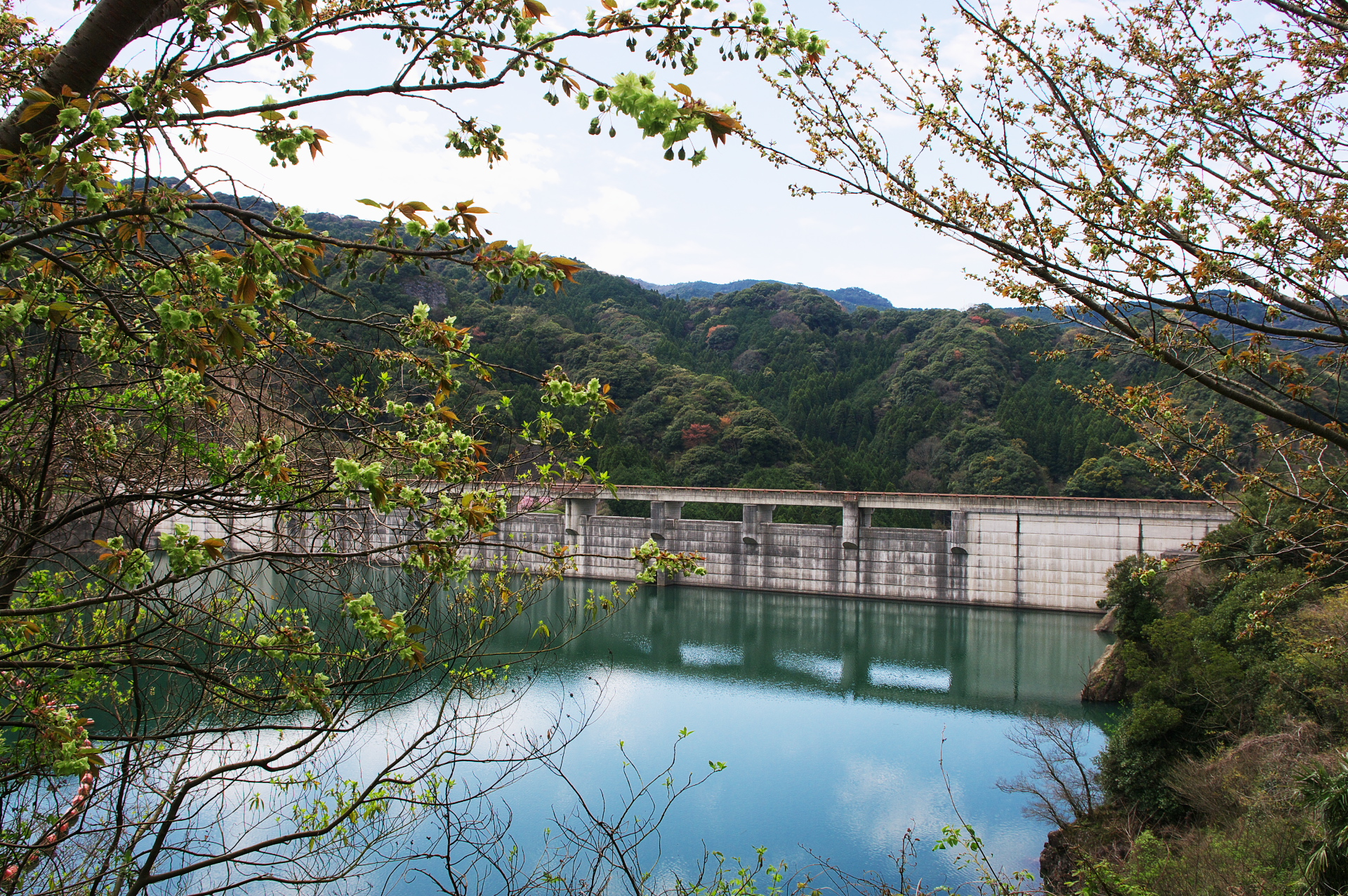

- Location within Japan
- Location: Saga Prefecture, Japan
- Coordinates: 33°3′34″N 130°2′17″E
- Construction began: 1973
- Opening date: 2001

Dam and spillways
- Height: 57 m (187 ft)
- Length: 249 m (817 ft)

Reservoir
- Total capacity: 4,290,000 m^{3} (151,000,000 cu ft)
- Catchment area: 8.3 km^{2} (3.2 sq mi)
- Surface area: 23 hectares (57 acres)

Yokotake Dam is a gravity dam located in Saga Prefecture in Japan. The dam is used for flood control. The catchment area of the dam is 8.3 km^{2}. The dam impounds about 23 ha of land when full and can store 4290 thousand cubic meters of water. The construction of the dam was started on 1973 and completed in 2001.
