= Hokuzan Dam =

Dam in Saga Prefecture, Japan

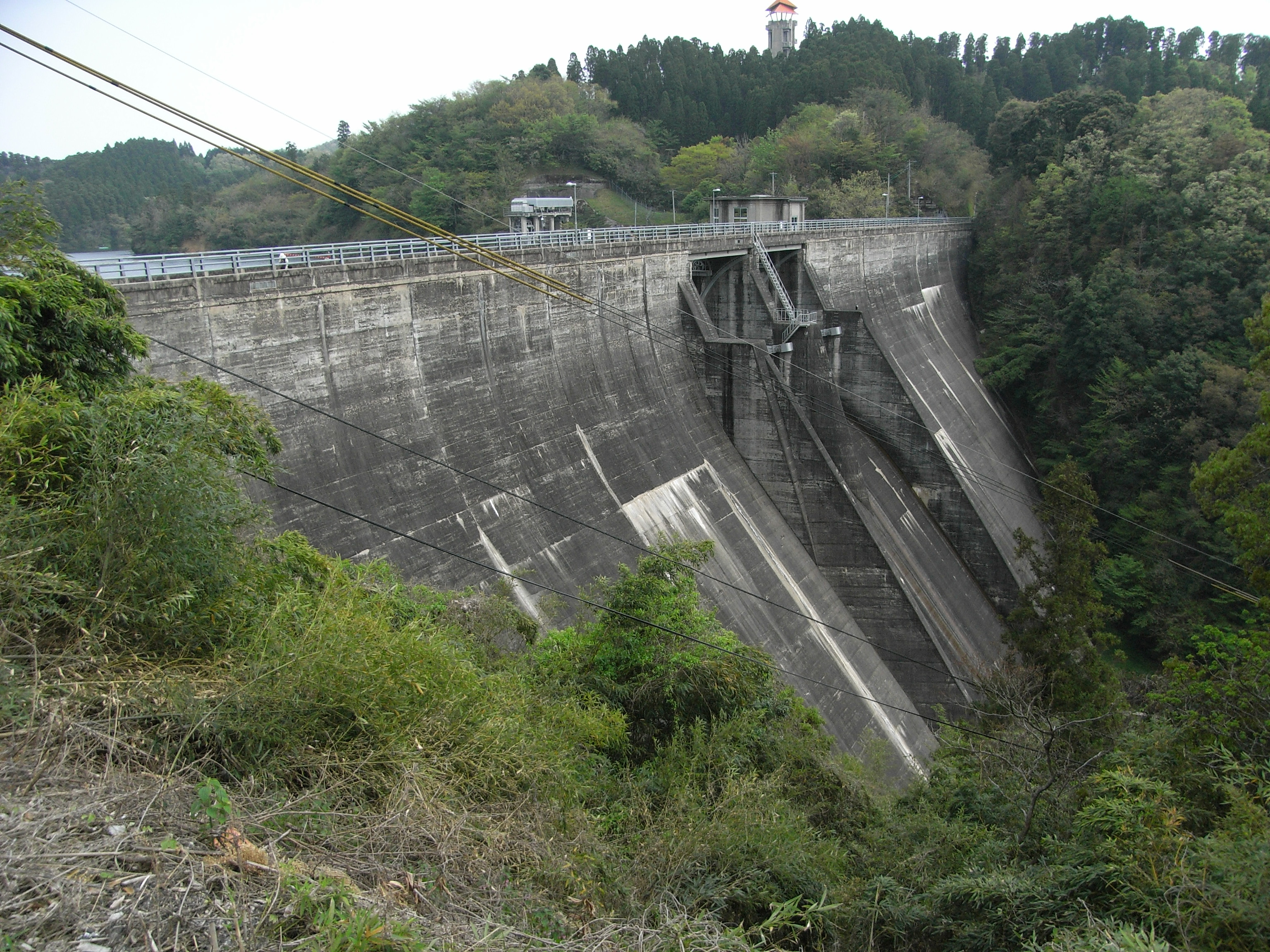

- Location within Japan
- Interactive map of Hokuzan Dam
- Location: Saga Prefecture, Japan
- Coordinates: 33°26′02″N 130°14′14″E
- Construction began: 1950
- Opening date: 1956

Dam and spillways
- Height: 59.3 m (195 ft)
- Length: 180 m (590 ft)

Reservoir
- Total capacity: 22250 thousand cubic meters
- Catchment area: 54.6 sq. km
- Surface area: 200 hectares

Hokuzan Dam is a concrete gravity dam located in Saga Prefecture in Japan. The dam is used for agriculture and power production. The catchment area of the dam is 54.6 km^{2}. The dam impounds about 200 ha of land when full and can store 22250 thousand cubic meters of water. The construction of the dam was started on 1950 and completed in 1956.
