= Ushirogawachi Dam =

Dam in Saga Prefecture, Japan

- Location within Japan
- Location: Saga Prefecture, Japan
- Coordinates: 33°26′44″N 129°55′18″E
- Construction began: 1972
- Opening date: 1992

Dam and spillways
- Height: 42.2 m (138 ft)
- Length: 250 m (820 ft)

Reservoir
- Total capacity: 3,754,000 m^{3} (132,600,000 cu ft)
- Catchment area: 0.5 km^{2} (0.19 sq mi)
- Surface area: 22 hectares (54 acres)

Ushirogawachi Dam is a rockfill dam located in Saga Prefecture in Japan. The dam is used for irrigation. The catchment area of the dam is 0.5 km^{2}. The dam impounds about 22 ha of land when full and can store 3754 thousand cubic meters of water. The construction of the dam was started on 1972 and completed in 1992.
