= Murayama-kami Dam =

Dam in Tokyo Prefecture, Japan

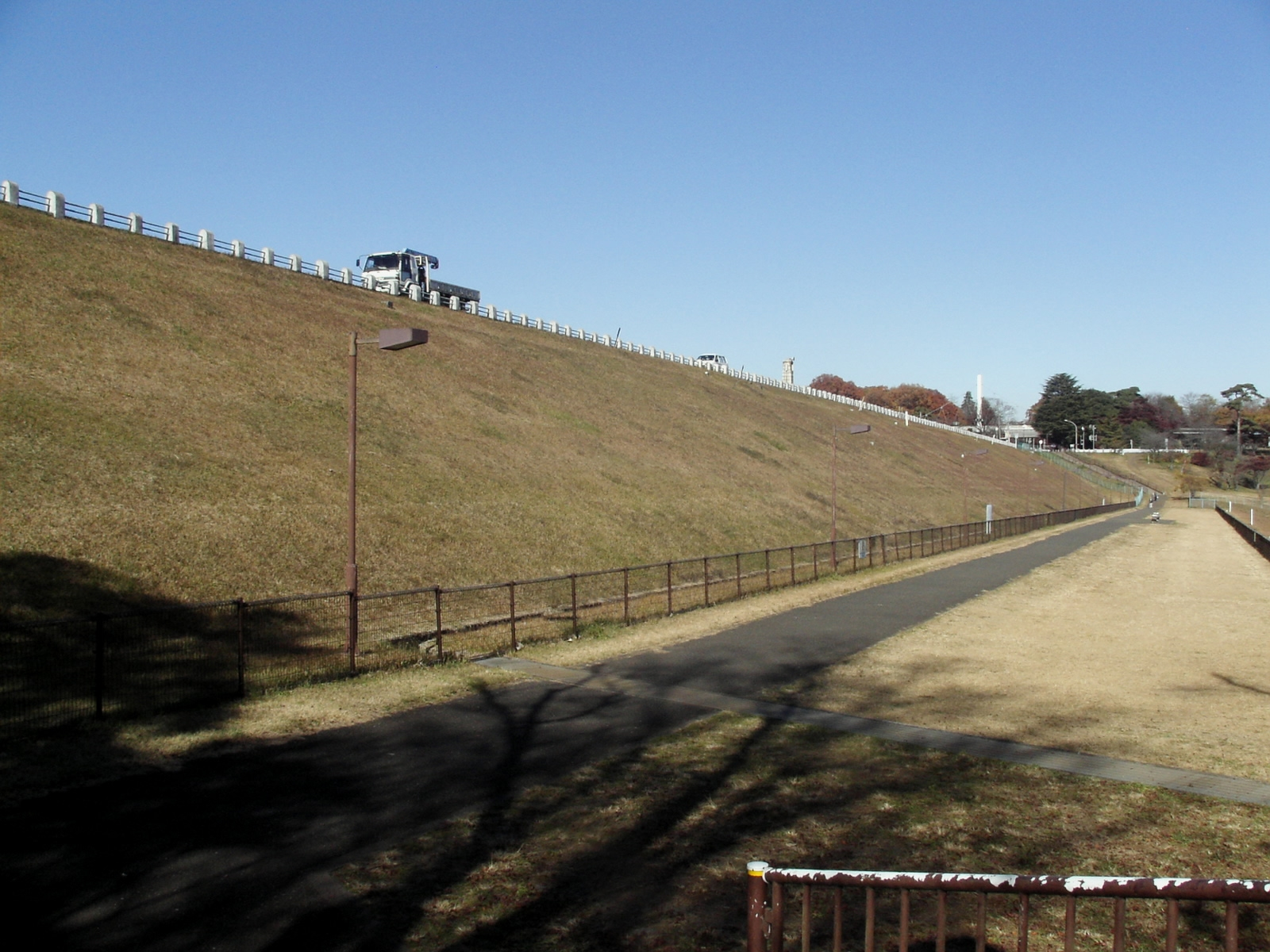

- Location within Japan
- Location: Tokyo Prefecture, Japan
- Coordinates: 35°45′48″N 139°25′02″E
- Opening date: 1924

Dam and spillways
- Type of dam: Embankment
- Height: 24.2 m (79 ft)
- Length: 318.2 m (1,044 ft)

Reservoir
- Total capacity: 3,321,000 m (10,896,000 ft)
- Catchment area: 1.3 km^{2} (0.50 sq mi)
- Surface area: 41 hectares

Murayama-kami Dam is an earthfill dam located in Tokyo prefecture in Japan. The dam is used for water supply. The catchment area of the dam is 1.3 km^{2}. The dam impounds about 41 ha of land when full and can store 3321 thousand cubic meters of water. The construction of the dam was completed in 1924.
