= Hirakoba Dam =

Dam in Saga Prefecture, Japan

- Location within Japan
- Interactive map of Hirakoba Dam
- Location: Saga Prefecture, Japan
- Coordinates: 33°25′56″N 129°56′44″E
- Construction began: 1972
- Opening date: 1983

Dam and spillways
- Height: 29.5 m (97 ft)
- Length: 117 m (384 ft)

Reservoir
- Total capacity: 1080 thousand cubic meters
- Catchment area: 2.2 sq. km
- Surface area: 10 hectares

Hirakoba Dam is a concrete gravity dam located in Saga Prefecture in Japan. The dam is used for flood water control and water supply. The catchment area of the dam is 2.2 km^{2}. The dam impounds about 10 ha of land when full and can store 1080 thousand cubic meters of water. The construction of the dam was started on 1972 and completed in 1983.
