= Arita Dam =

Dam in Saga Prefecture, Japan

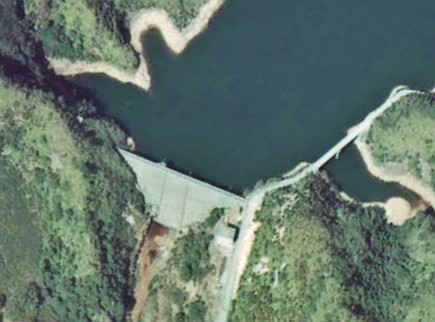

- Location within Japan
- Interactive map of Arita Dam
- Country: Japan
- Location: Saga Prefecture, Japan
- Coordinates: 33°11′54″N 129°53′43″E
- Construction began: 1958
- Opening date: 1961

Dam and spillways
- Height: 27.5 m (90 ft)
- Length: 108 m (354 ft)

Reservoir
- Total capacity: 1880 thousand cubic meters
- Catchment area: 2.2 sq. km
- Surface area: 18 hectares

Arita Dam is a gravity dam located in Saga Prefecture in Japan. The dam is used for flood control and water supply. The catchment area of the dam is 2.2 km^{2}. The dam impounds about 18 ha of land when full and can store 1880 thousand cubic meters of water. The construction of the dam was started on 1958 and completed in 1961.
