= Agekura Dam =

Dam in Saga Prefecture, Japan

- Location within Japan
- Location: Saga Prefecture, Japan
- Coordinates: 33°25′22″N 129°51′08″E
- Construction began: 1972
- Opening date: 1992

Dam and spillways
- Height: 19.6 m (64 ft)
- Length: 196.8 m (646 ft)

Reservoir
- Total capacity: 804 thousand cubic meters
- Catchment area: 0.4 km^{2}
- Surface area: 15 hectares

Agekura Dam is an earthen dam located in Saga Prefecture in Japan. The dam is used for agriculture. The catchment area of the dam is 0.4 km^{2}. The dam impounds about 15 hectares of land when full and can store 804 thousand cubic meters of water. The construction of the dam was started on 1972 and completed in 1992.
