= Haccho Dam =

Dam in Saga Prefecture, Japan

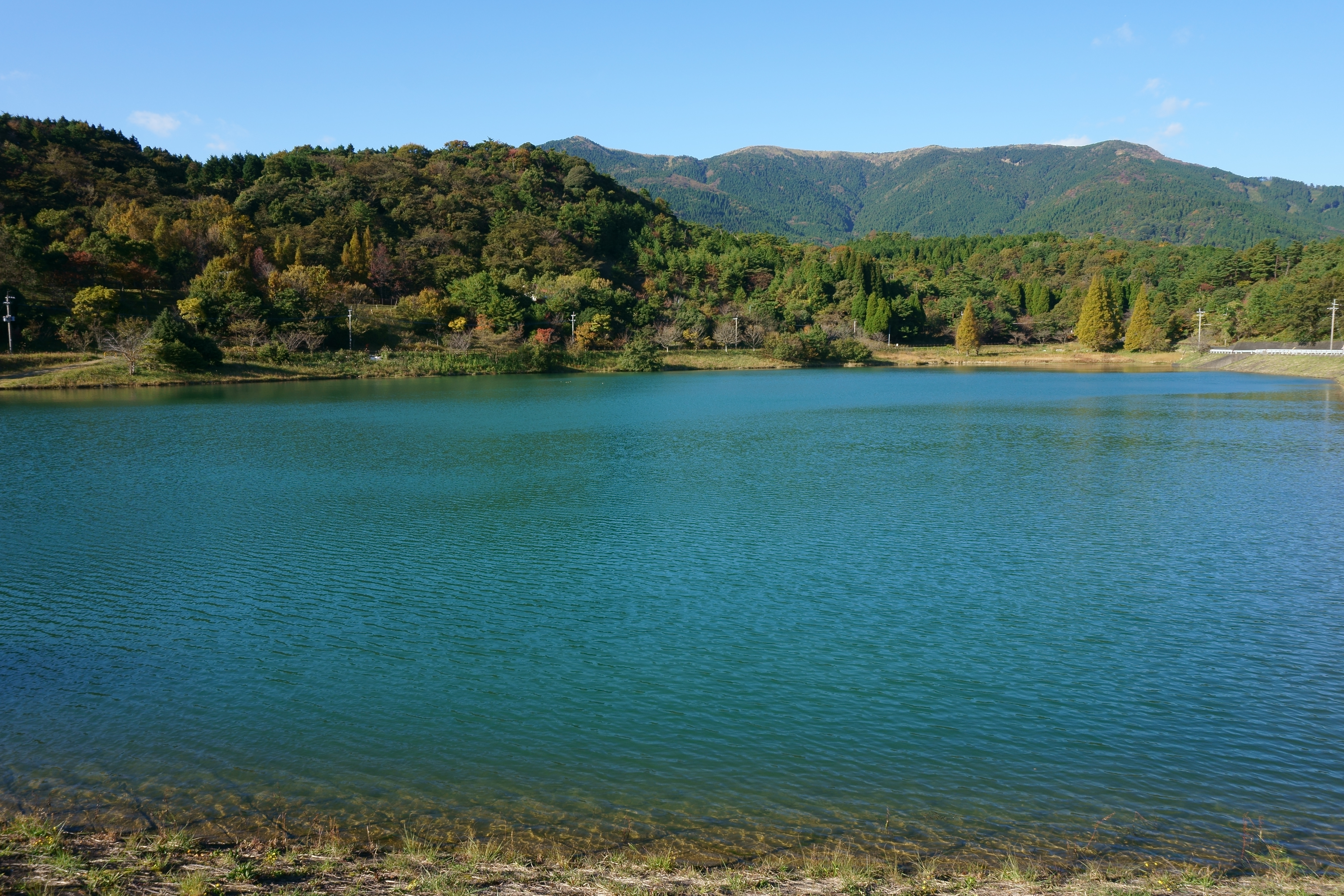
- Reservoir of Haccho dam

- Location within Japan
- Interactive map of Haccho Dam
- Location: Saga Prefecture, Japan
- Coordinates: 33°18′47″N 130°8′56″E
- Construction began: 1973
- Opening date: 1982

Dam and spillways
- Height: 24.6 m (81 ft)
- Length: 346.6 m (1,137 ft)

Reservoir
- Total capacity: 347 thousand cubic meters
- Catchment area: 1.3 sq. km
- Surface area: 6 hectares

Haccho Dam is a rockfill dam located in Saga Prefecture in Japan. The dam is used for agriculture. The catchment area of the dam is 1.3 km^{2}. The dam impounds about 6 ha of land when full and can store 347 thousand cubic meters of water. The construction of the dam was started on 1973 and completed in 1982.
