= Hansho Dam =

Dam in Saga Prefecture, Japan

- Location within Japan
- Interactive map of Hansho Dam
- Location: Saga Prefecture, Japan
- Coordinates: 33°13′36″N 130°0′48″E
- Construction began: 1973
- Opening date: 1978

Dam and spillways
- Height: 29.4 m (96 ft)
- Length: 156 m (512 ft)

Reservoir
- Total capacity: 645 thousand cubic meters
- Catchment area: 1.6 sq. km
- Surface area: 8 hectares

Hansho Dam is an earthfill dam located in Saga Prefecture in Japan. The dam is used for agriculture. The catchment area of the dam is 1.6 km^{2}. The dam impounds about 8 ha of land when full and can store 645 thousand cubic meters of water. The construction of the dam was started on 1973 and completed in 1978.
