= Fuchinoo Dam =

Dam in Saga Prefecture, Japan

- Location within Japan
- Official name: 渕の尾ダム
- Location: Saga Prefecture, Japan
- Coordinates: 33°10′53″N 129°59′50″E
- Construction began: 1979
- Opening date: 1980

Dam and spillways
- Impounds: Rokkaku River
- Height: 29 m (95 ft)
- Length: 138 m (453 ft)

Reservoir
- Creates: Takeo River
- Total capacity: 585 thousand cubic meters
- Catchment area: 21.9 sq. km
- Surface area: 7 hectares

Fuchinoo Dam (Re) is a concrete gravity dam located in Saga Prefecture in Japan. The dam is used for water supply. The catchment area of the dam is 21.9 km^{2}. The dam impounds about seven ha of land when full and can store 585 thousand cubic meters of water. The construction of the dam was started in 1979 and completed in 1980.
