= Ikisa Dam =

Dam in Saga Prefecture, Japan

- Location within Japan
- Interactive map of Ikisa Dam
- Location: Saga Prefecture, Japan
- Coordinates: 33°22′04″N 130°2′34″E
- Construction began: 1969
- Opening date: 1979

Dam and spillways
- Height: 58.5 m (192 ft)
- Length: 203 m (666 ft)

Reservoir
- Total capacity: 1940 thousand cubic meters
- Catchment area: 9.6 sq. km
- Surface area: 10 hectares

Ikisa Dam is a concrete gravity dam located in Saga Prefecture in Japan. The dam is used for flood control and water supply. The catchment area of the dam is 9.6 km^{2}. The dam impounds about 10 ha of land when full and can store 1940 thousand cubic meters of water. The construction of the dam was started on 1969 and completed in 1979.
