= Shigure Dam =

Dam in Tokyo Prefecture, Japan

- Location within Japan
- Location: Tokyo Prefecture, Japan
- Coordinates: 27°3′39″N 142°12′33″E
- Opening date: 1976

Dam and spillways
- Type of dam: Embankment
- Impounds: Headwaters of Yasse River
- Height: 24.2 m (79 ft)
- Length: 94 m (308 ft)

Reservoir
- Total capacity: 100,000 m^{3} (3,500,000 cu ft)
- Surface area: 2 hectares (4.9 acres)

Shigure Dam is an asphalt dam located in Tokyo prefecture in Japan. The dam is used for water supply. The dam impounds about 2 ha of land when full and can store 100 thousand cubic meters of water. The construction of the dam was completed in 1976.
