= List of dams in Japan =

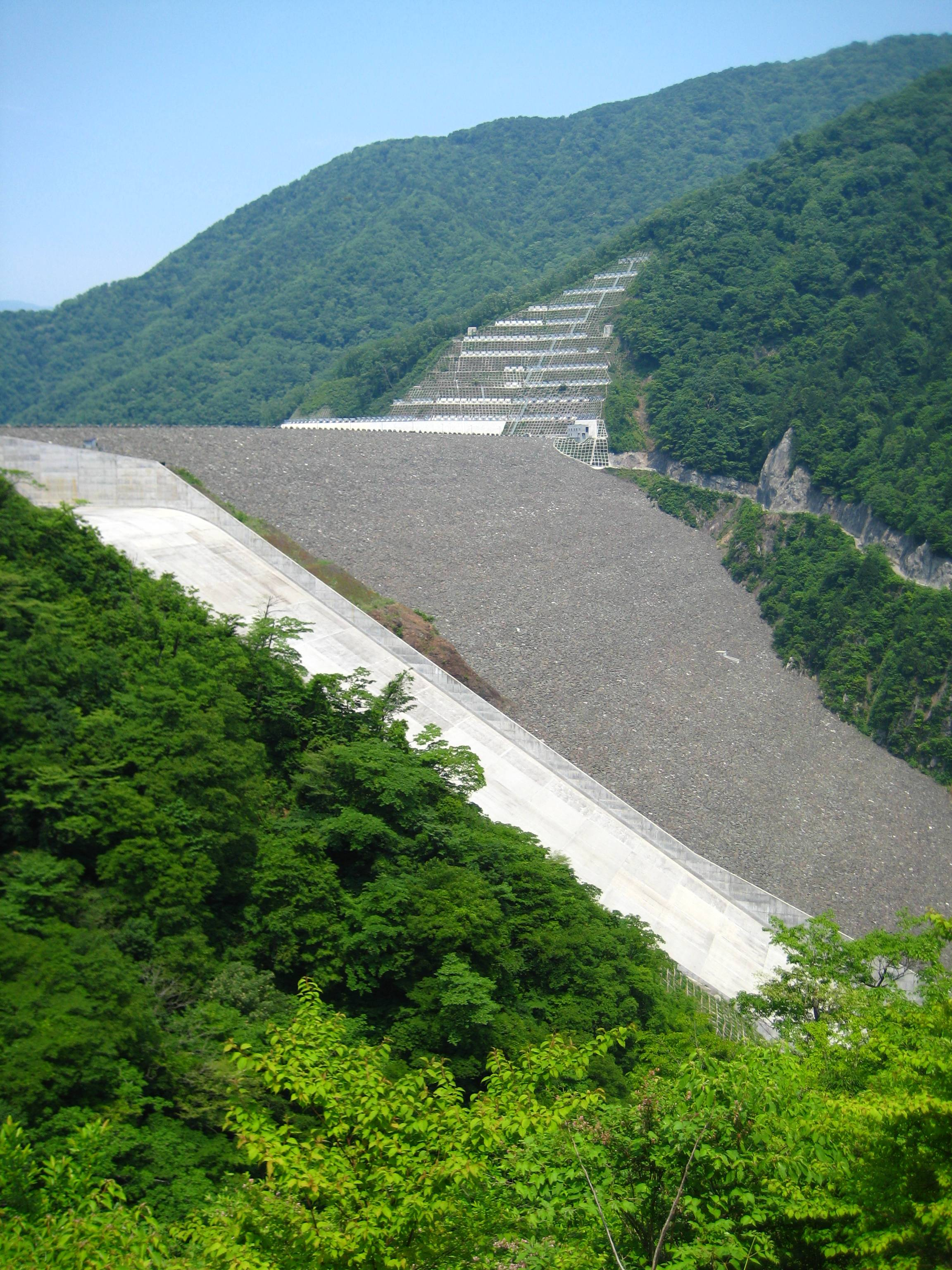
Tokuyama Dam

As a nation of islands and narrow, steep valleys, dams play a vital role in Japanese society as they are constructed primarily to control floods, supply water and generate hydroelectric power. The tallest dam in Japan is the 186 m (610 ft) high Kurobe Dam. The largest dam by structural volume in the country is the Tokuyama Dam (pictured) with 13,700,000 m^{3} (17,900,000 cu yd) of rock-fill. Tokuyama also creates Japan's largest reservoir with a water volume of 660,000,000 m^{3} (540,000 acre⋅ft).

The dams are arranged by prefecture in the list below.

== Chubu region ==
- Aichi
- Fukui
- Gifu
- Ishikawa
- Nagano
- Niigata
- Shizuoka
- Toyama
- Yamanashi

== Chugoku region ==
- Hiroshima
- Okayama
- Shimane
- Tottori
- Yamaguchi

== Kansai region ==
- Hyogo
- Kyoto
- Mie
- Nara
- Osaka
- Shiga
- Wakayama

== Kanto region ==
- Chiba
- Gunma
- Ibaraki
- Kanagawa
- Saitama
- Tochigi
- Tokyo

== Kyushu region ==
- Fukuoka
- Kagoshima
- Kumamoto
- Miyazaki
- Nagasaki
- Okinawa
- Oita
- Saga

== Hokkaido region ==
- Hokkaido

== Shikoku region ==
- Ehime
- Kagawa
- Kochi
- Tokushima

== Tohoku region ==
- Akita
- Aomori
- Fukushima
- Iwate
- Miyagi
- Yamagata

== See also ==
- List of power stations in Japan
- List of dams and reservoirs
