= List of dams in Hyōgo Prefecture =

The following is a list of dams in Hyogo Prefecture, Japan.

== List ==
Name	Location	Opened	Height (metres)	Image
Amagawa No.2 Dam		1982	21	
Ansei-ike Dam		1963	29	
Aono Dam		1987	29	
Aiyagawa Dam		1970	46.2	
Daijo-ike Dam		1928	35.5	
Dainichi Dam			36	
Dainichigawa Dam		1966	42.8	
Dondo Dam		1989	71.5	
Fujioka Dam			43.4	
Fukatani Dam		1971	41	
Funaki-ike Dam		1959	31	
Gongen No.1 Dam			32.6	
Gongen No.2 Dam				
Gongen No.3 Dam			22.6	
Hachimandani Dam			27.5	
Hase Dam			102	
Hatsuogawa Dam			31.2	
Hikihara Dam				
Hitokura Dam		1983	75	
Honjokawa Dam		2004	47.7	
Ikuno Dam		1984	56.5	
Inohana Dam		1933	27.9	
Inohana No.2 Dam		1978	41.5	
Irie Dam		1958	23.4	
Kakinokidani-ike Dam		2006	25.1	
Kakogawa Weir				
Kamogawa Dam		1951	42.2	
Kanaji Dam		2015	62.3	
Kannonji-ike Dam		1942	22.7	
Kawashimogawa Dam		1977	45	
Kinen-ike Dam		1944	15.5	
Kitafuji Dam		1999	52.5	
Kitayama No.1 Dam		1968	24	
Kitayama No.4 Dam		1968	16	
Kochi Dam		1985	24	
Koda-ike Dam		1953	22.3	
Koike Dam		1990	28.5	
Kojiya Dam			44.1	
Kotani Dam		2000	79	
Kuroishi Dam		1976	29.6	
Kurokawa Dam			98	
Kurusu-ike Dam		1951	26.7	
Kusaki Dam		1913	24.8	
Maruyama Dam			31	
Mikumari Dam		2009	26	
Minamitaniguchi Dam		1994	22.1	
Mirotani Dam		1987	30	
Mitakara Dam		1994	35.1	
Nagaidani Dam		1983	25.3	
Nagatani-oike Dam		1957	22.1	
Nariai Dam		1999	61	
Nishiki Dam		2013	26.7	
Nunobiki Dam		1900	33.3	
Okawase Dam		1991	50.8	
Ohmachi-ohike Dam		1994	25.5	
Ohro Dam		1998	32.1	
Osugi Dam		1974	40	
Ota No.1 Dam		1995	55.5	
Ota No.2 Dam		1995	44.5	
Ohta No.3 Dam		1995	23.5	
Ota No.4 Dam		1995	29.3	
Ohta No.5 Dam		1995	26.5	
Otani Dam		1970	16.6	
Ohtoguchi Dam		1989	23.3	
Sakura-ike Dam		1951	22.7	
Sanaka Dam		1978	38.9	
Sengari Dam		1919	42.4	
Showa-ike Dam		1944	23	
Sugo Dam		2010	55.7	
Tachigahata Dam		1905	33.3	
Takehara Dam		1962	34	
Taniyama Dam		1974	28.2	
Tanto Dam		2006	25.7	
Tataragi Dam			64.5	
Tenno Dam		1980	33.8	
Tokiwa Dam		1974	33.5	
Tsubaichi Dam		1971	34.5	
Ushiuchi Dam		1997	59	
Yamada Dam		1968	15.8	
Yamada-ike Dam		1932	27.3	
Yasumuro Dam		1991	50	
Yasutomi Dam		1985	50.5	
Yofudo Dam		2016	54.4	
Yuduruha Dam		1974	43.9	

== See also ==
- Media related to List of dams in Hyōgo Prefecture at Wikimedia Commons
