= Sugo Dam =

Sugo Dam may refer to:

- Sugo Dam (Hyōgo)
- Sugo Dam (Miyagi)
