= Taniyama Dam =

Dam in Hyogo Prefecture, Japan

- Location within Japan
- Official name: 谷山ダム
- Location: Hyogo Prefecture, Japan
- Coordinates: 34°33′52″N 134°59′37″E
- Construction began: 1972
- Opening date: 1974

Dam and spillways
- Height: 28.2 m (93 ft)
- Length: 151.4 m (497 ft)

Reservoir
- Total capacity: 412,000 m^{3} (14,500,000 cu ft)
- Catchment area: 2.9 km^{2} (1.1 sq mi)
- Surface area: 7 hectares (17 acres)

Taniyama Dam (Japanese: 谷山ダム) is an earthfill dam located in Hyogo Prefecture in Japan. The dam is used for irrigation. The catchment area of the dam is 2.9 km^{2}. When at full capacity, it impounds about 7 ha of land and has a storage capacity of 412 thousand cubic meters of water. The construction of the dam was started on 1972 and completed in 1974.

== See also ==
- List of dams in Japan
