= Kotani Dam =

Dam in Hyogo Prefecture, Japan

- Location within Japan
- Official name: 神谷ダム
- Location: Hyogo Prefecture, Japan
- Coordinates: 34°53′14″N 134°46′41″E
- Construction began: 1973
- Opening date: 2000

Dam and spillways
- Height: 79 m (259 ft)
- Length: 303.4 m (995 ft)

Reservoir
- Total capacity: 16600 thousand cubic meters
- Catchment area: 2.2 sq. km
- Surface area: 72 hectares

Kotani Dam (Japanese: 神谷ダム) is a rockfill dam located in Hyogo Prefecture in Japan. The dam is used for water supply. The catchment area of the dam is 2.2 km^{2}. The dam impounds about 72 ha of land when full and can store 16600 thousand cubic meters of water. The construction of the dam was started on 1973 and completed in 2000.

== See also ==
- List of dams in Japan
