= Nagatani-oike Dam =

Dam in Hyogo Prefecture, Japan

- Location within Japan
- Official name: 長谷大池
- Location: Hyogo Prefecture, Japan
- Coordinates: 35°8′09″N 135°7′25″E
- Opening date: 1957

Dam and spillways
- Height: 22.1 m (73 ft)
- Length: 228 m (748 ft)

Reservoir
- Total capacity: 483 thousand cubic meters
- Catchment area: 2 sq. km
- Surface area: 5 hectares

Nagatani-oike Dam (Japanese: 長谷大池) is an earthfill dam located in Hyogo Prefecture in Japan. The dam is used for irrigation. The catchment area of the dam is 2 km^{2}. The dam impounds about 5 ha of land when full and can store 483 thousand cubic meters of water. The construction of the dam was completed in 1957.

== See also ==
- List of dams in Japan
