= Ohtani-ike Dam (Hyōgo) =

Dam in Hyogo Prefecture, Japan

Ohtani-ike
- Location within Japan
- Official name: 大谷池
- Location: Hyogo Prefecture, Japan
- Coordinates: 34°34′19″N 134°59′20″E
- Construction began: 1963
- Opening date: 1970

Dam and spillways
- Height: 16.6 m (54 ft)
- Length: 100 m (330 ft)

Reservoir
- Total capacity: 224,000 m^{3} (7,900,000 cu ft)
- Surface area: 5 hectares (12 acres)

Ohtani-ike (Japanese: 大谷池) is an earthfill dam located in Hyogo Prefecture in Japan. The dam is used for irrigation. The dam impounds about 5 ha of land when full and can store 224 thousand cubic meters of water. The construction of the dam was started on 1963 and completed in 1970.

== See also ==
- List of dams in Japan
