= Irie Dam =

Dam in Hyogo Prefecture, Japan

- Location within Japan
- Interactive map of Irie Dam
- Official name: 入江ダム
- Location: Hyogo Prefecture, Japan
- Coordinates: 35°29′02″N 134°34′34″E
- Construction began: 1958
- Opening date: 1958

Dam and spillways
- Height: 23.4 m (77 ft)
- Length: 113.5 m (372 ft)

Reservoir
- Total capacity: 544 thousand cubic meters
- Catchment area: 147.2 sq. km
- Surface area: 7 hectares

Irie Dam (Japanese: 入江ダム) is a gravity dam located in Hyogo Prefecture in Japan. The dam is used for power production. The catchment area of the dam is 147.2 km^{2}. The dam impounds about 7 ha of land when full and can store 544 thousand cubic meters of water. The construction of the dam was started on 1958 and completed in 1958.

== See also ==
- List of dams in Japan
