= Ayuyagawa Dam =

Dam in Hyogo Prefecture, Japan

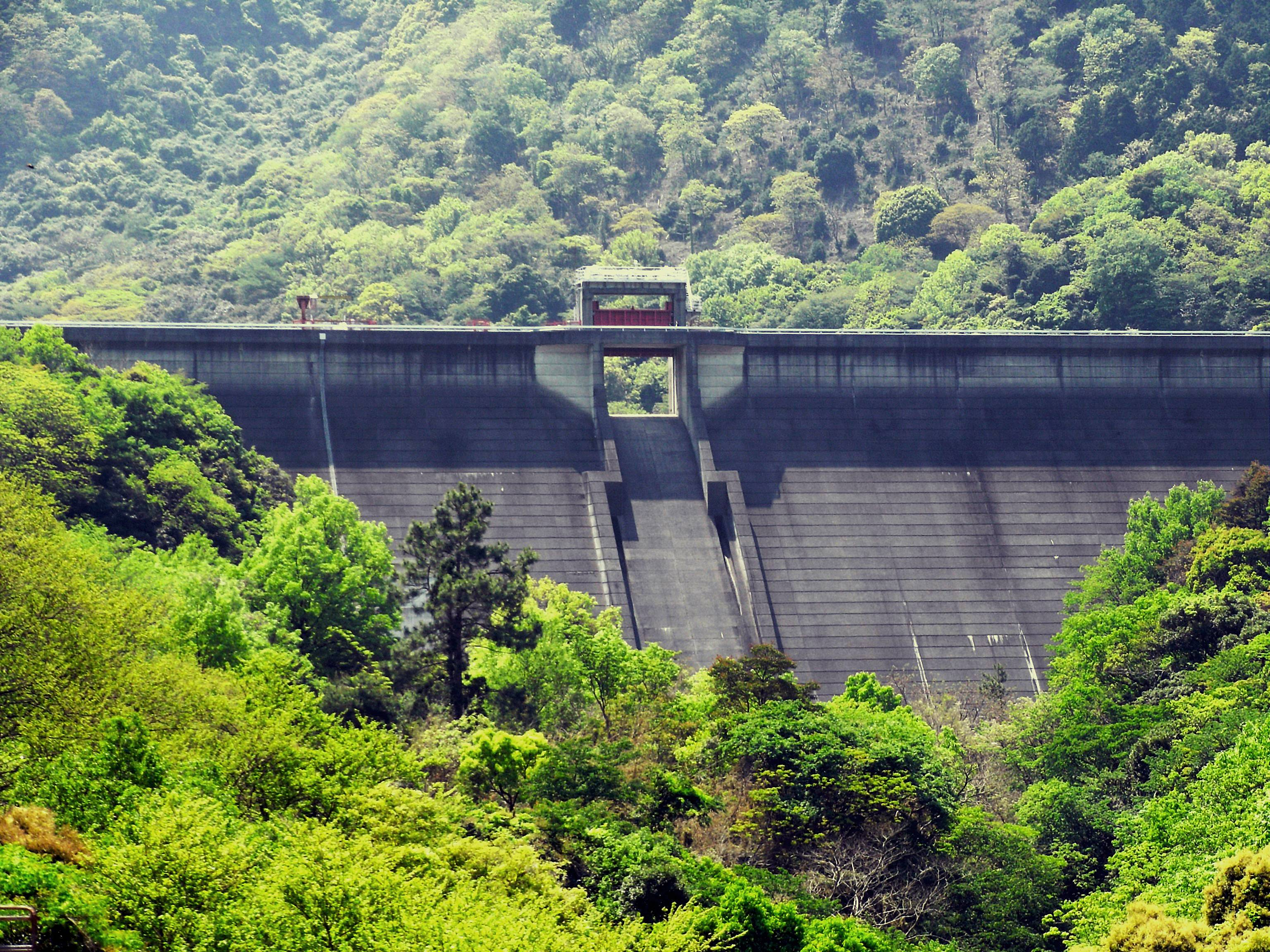

- Location within Japan
- Interactive map of Ayuyagawa Dam
- Official name: 鮎屋川ダム
- Location: Hyogo Prefecture, Japan
- Coordinates: 34°17′50″N 134°50′38″E
- Opening date: 1970

Dam and spillways
- Height: 46.2 m (152 ft)
- Length: 198.3 m (651 ft)

Reservoir
- Total capacity: 1800 thousand cubic meters
- Catchment area: 8.7 sq. km
- Surface area: 12 hectares

Ayuyagawa Dam (Japanese: 鮎屋川ダム) is a gravity dam located in Hyogo Prefecture in Japan. The dam is used for flood control and irrigation. The catchment area of the dam is 8.7 km^{2}. The dam impounds about 12 ha of land when full and can store 1800 thousand cubic meters of water. The construction of the dam was completed in 1970.

== See also ==
- List of dams in Japan
