= Yuzuruha Dam =

Dam in Hyogo Prefecture, Japan

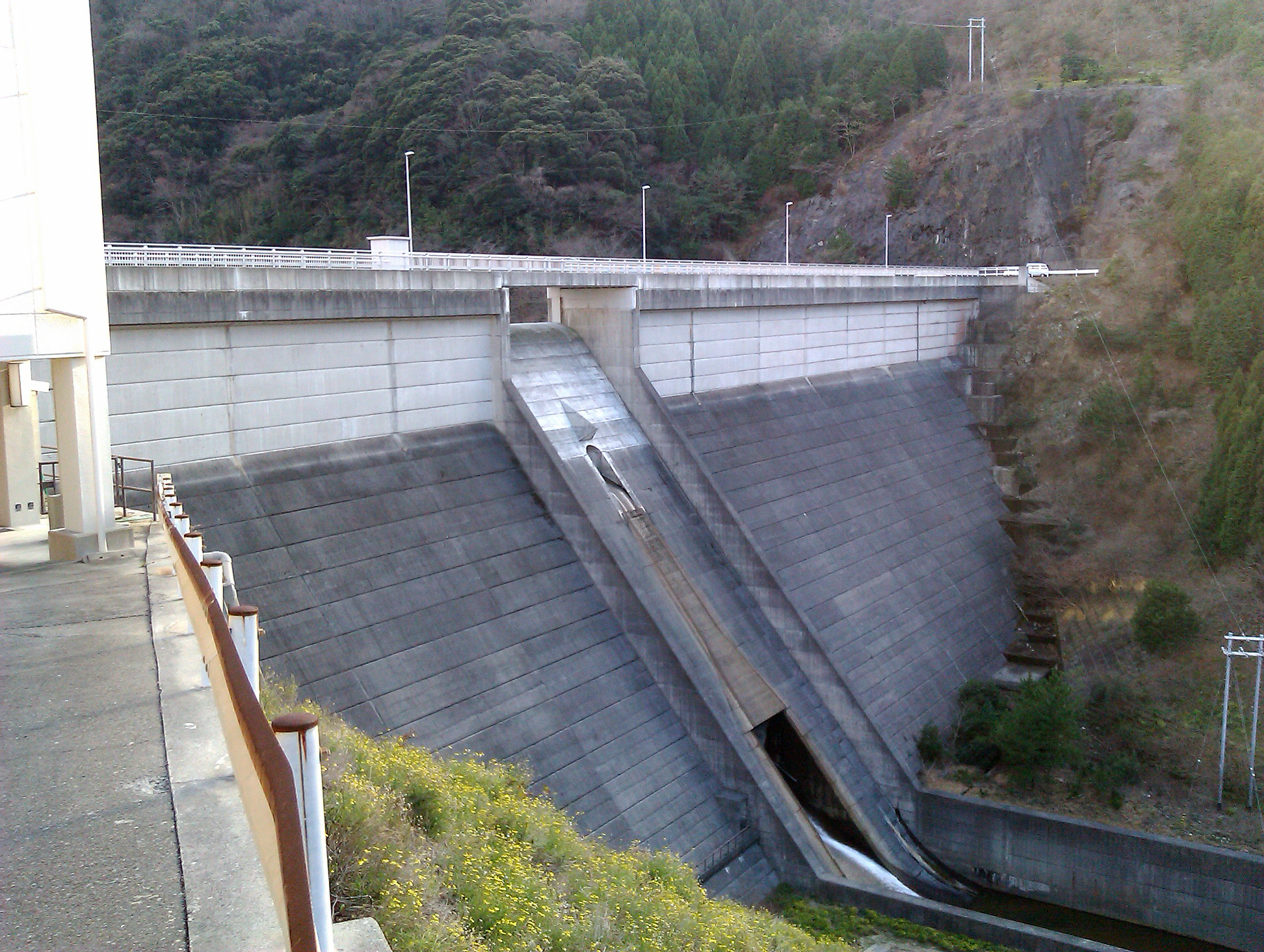

- Location within Japan
- Official name: 諭鶴羽ダム
- Location: Hyogo Prefecture, Japan
- Coordinates: 34°14′59″N 134°47′51″E
- Construction began: 1968
- Opening date: 1974

Dam and spillways
- Height: 43.9 m (144 ft)
- Length: 173 m (568 ft)

Reservoir
- Total capacity: 1,300,000 m^{3} (46,000,000 cu ft)
- Catchment area: 4.1 km^{2} (1.6 sq mi)
- Surface area: 11 hectares (27 acres)

Yuzuruha Dam (Japanese: 諭鶴羽ダム) is a gravity dam located in Hyogo Prefecture in Japan. The dam is used for flood control. The catchment area of the dam is 4.1 km^{2}. The dam impounds about 11 ha of land when full and can store 1300 thousand cubic meters of water. The construction of the dam was started on 1968 and completed in 1974.

== See also ==
- List of dams in Japan
