= Tachigahata Dam =

Dam in Hyogo Prefecture, Japan

- Location within Japan
- Official name: 立ヶ畑ダム
- Location: Hyogo Prefecture, Japan
- Coordinates: 34°41′29″N 135°9′32″E
- Construction began: 1901
- Opening date: 1905

Dam and spillways
- Height: 33.3 m (109 ft)
- Length: 122.4 m (402 ft)

Reservoir
- Total capacity: 1,248,000 m^{3} (44,100,000 cu ft)
- Catchment area: 18.9 km^{2} (7.3 sq mi)
- Surface area: 11 hectares (27 acres)

Tachigahata Dam (Japanese: 立ヶ畑ダム) is a gravity dam located in Hyogo Prefecture in Japan. The dam is used for water supply. The catchment area of the dam is 18.9 km^{2}. The dam impounds about 11 ha of land when full and can store 1248 thousand cubic meters of water. The construction of the dam was started on 1901 and completed in 1905.

== See also ==
- List of dams in Japan
