= Amagawa No.2 Dam =

Dam in Hyogo Prefecture, Japan

- Location within Japan
- Interactive map of Amagawa No.2 Dam
- Official name: 天川第２ダム
- Location: Hyogo Prefecture, Japan
- Coordinates: 34°17′15″N 134°55′36″E
- Construction began: 1980
- Opening date: 1982

Dam and spillways
- Height: 21 m (69 ft)
- Length: 82.9 m (272 ft)

Reservoir
- Total capacity: 112 thousand cubic meters
- Catchment area: 2.6 sq. km
- Surface area: 2 hectares

Amagawa No.2 Dam (Japanese: 天川第２ダム) is a gravity dam located in Hyogo Prefecture in Japan. The dam is used for water supply. The catchment area of the dam is 2.6 km^{2}. The dam impounds about 2 ha of land when full and can store 112 thousand cubic meters of water. The construction of the dam was started on 1980 and completed in 1982.

== See also ==
- List of dams in Japan
