= Tenno Dam =

Dam in Hyogo Prefecture, Japan

- Location within Japan
- Official name: 天王ダム
- Location: Hyogo Prefecture, Japan
- Coordinates: 34°43′01″N 135°9′34″E
- Construction began: 1968
- Opening date: 1980

Dam and spillways
- Height: 33.8 m (111 ft)
- Length: 127 m (417 ft)

Reservoir
- Total capacity: 800,000 m^{3} (28,000,000 cu ft)
- Catchment area: 4.6 km^{2} (1.8 sq mi)
- Surface area: 11 hectares (27 acres)

Tenno Dam (Japanese: 天王ダム) is a gravity dam located in Hyogo Prefecture in Japan. The dam is used for flood control. The catchment area of the dam is 4.6 km^{2}. The dam impounds about 11 ha of land when full and can store 800 thousand cubic meters of water. The construction of the dam was started on 1968 and completed in 1980.

== See also ==
- List of dams in Japan
