= Ohmachi-ohike Dam =

Dam in Hyogo Prefecture, Japan

Ohmachi-ohike
- Location within Japan
- Official name: 大町大池
- Location: Hyōgo Prefecture, Japan
- Coordinates: 35°21′05″N 134°54′59″E
- Construction began: 1987
- Opening date: 1994

Dam and spillways
- Height: 25.5 m (84 ft)
- Length: 111.8 m (367 ft)

Reservoir
- Total capacity: 143,000 m^{3} (5,000,000 cu ft)
- Catchment area: 0.9 km^{2} (0.35 sq mi)
- Surface area: 2 hectares (4.9 acres)

Ohmachi-ohike (Japanese: 大町大池) is an earthfill dam located in Hyōgo Prefecture in Japan. The dam is used for irrigation. The catchment area of the dam is 0.9 km^{2}. The dam impounds about 2 ha of land when full and can store 143 thousand cubic meters of water. The construction of the dam was started on 1987 and completed in 1994.

== See also ==
- List of dams in Japan
