= Ansei-ike Dam =

Dam in Hyogo Prefecture, Japan

- Location within Japan
- Interactive map of Ansei-ike Dam
- Official name: 安政池
- Location: Hyogo Prefecture, Japan
- Coordinates: 34°53′50″N 135°0′30″E
- Construction began: 1947
- Opening date: 1963

Dam and spillways
- Height: 29 m (95 ft)
- Length: 185 m (607 ft)

Reservoir
- Total capacity: 642 thousand cubic meters
- Catchment area: 78.6 sq. km
- Surface area: 9 hectares

Ansei-ike Dam (Japanese: 安政池) is an earthfill dam located in Hyogo Prefecture in Japan. The dam is used for irrigation. The catchment area of the dam is 78.6 km^{2}. The dam impounds about 9 ha of land when full and can store 642 thousand cubic meters of water. The construction of the dam was started on 1947 and completed in 1963.

== See also ==
- List of dams in Japan
