= Kannonji-ike Dam =

Dam in Hyogo Prefecture, Japan

Kannonji-ike
- Location within Japan
- Interactive map of Kannonji-ike
- Official name: 観音寺池
- Location: Hyogo Prefecture, Japan
- Coordinates: 35°27′18″N 134°49′16″E
- Opening date: 1942

Dam and spillways
- Height: 22.7 m (74 ft)
- Length: 78 m (256 ft)

Reservoir
- Total capacity: 103 thousand cubic meters
- Surface area: 2 hectares

Kannonji-ike (Japanese: 観音寺池) is an earthfill dam located in Hyogo Prefecture in Japan. The dam is used for irrigation. The dam impounds about 2 ha of land when full and can store 103 thousand cubic meters of water. The construction of the dam was completed in 1942.

== See also ==
- List of dams in Japan
