= Yamada Dam =

Dam in Hyogo Prefecture, Japan

- Location within Japan
- Official name: 山田ダム
- Location: Hyogo Prefecture, Japan
- Coordinates: 34°53′46″N 135°15′04″E
- Construction began: 1954
- Opening date: 1968

Dam and spillways
- Height: 15.8 m (52 ft)
- Length: 58 m (190 ft)

Reservoir
- Total capacity: 174,000 m^{3} (6,100,000 cu ft)
- Catchment area: 13.5 km^{2} (5.2 sq mi)
- Surface area: 5 hectares (12 acres)

Yamada Dam (Japanese: 山田ダム) is a gravity dam located in Hyogo Prefecture in Japan. The dam is used for irrigation and water supply. The catchment area of the dam is 13.5 km^{2}. The dam impounds about 5 ha of land when full and can store 174 thousand cubic meters of water. The construction of the dam was started on 1954 and completed in 1968.

== See also ==
- List of dams in Japan
