= Tsubaichi Dam =

Dam in Hyogo Prefecture, Japan

- Location within Japan
- Official name: 鍔市ダム
- Location: Hyogo Prefecture, Japan
- Coordinates: 35°6′32″N 135°16′19″E
- Construction began: 1969
- Opening date: 1971

Dam and spillways
- Height: 34.5 m (113 ft)
- Length: 128.9 m (423 ft)

Reservoir
- Total capacity: 1,070,000 m^{3} (38,000,000 cu ft)
- Catchment area: 2.7 km^{2} (1.0 sq mi)
- Surface area: 9 hectares (22 acres)

Tsubaichi Dam (Japanese: 鍔市ダム) is an earthfill dam that is located in Hyogo Prefecture, Japan. The dam is used for irrigation. The catchment area of the dam is 2.7 km^{2}. The dam impounds about 9 ha of land when full and can store up to 1070 (ten thousand and seventy) cubic meters of water. The construction of the dam was started in 1969 and was completed by 1971.

== See also ==
- List of dams in Japan
