= Nishiki Dam =

Dam in Hyogo Prefecture, Japan

- Location within Japan
- Official name: 栗柄ダム
- Location: Hyogo Prefecture, Japan
- Coordinates: 35°8′15″N 135°13′25″E
- Construction began: 1994
- Opening date: 2013

Dam and spillways
- Height: 26.7 m (88 ft)
- Length: 172 m (564 ft)

Reservoir
- Total capacity: 383,000 m^{3} (13,500,000 cu ft)
- Catchment area: 1.1 km^{2} (0.42 sq mi)
- Surface area: 4 hectares (9.9 acres)

Nishiki Dam (Japanese: 栗柄ダム) is a gravity dam located in Hyogo Prefecture in Japan. The dam is used for flood control and water supply. The catchment area of the dam is 1.1 km^{2}. The dam impounds about 4 ha of land when full and can store 383 thousand cubic meters of water. The construction of the dam was started on 1994 and completed in 2013.

== See also ==
- List of dams in Japan
