= Kawashimogawa Dam =

Dam in Hyogo Prefecture, Japan

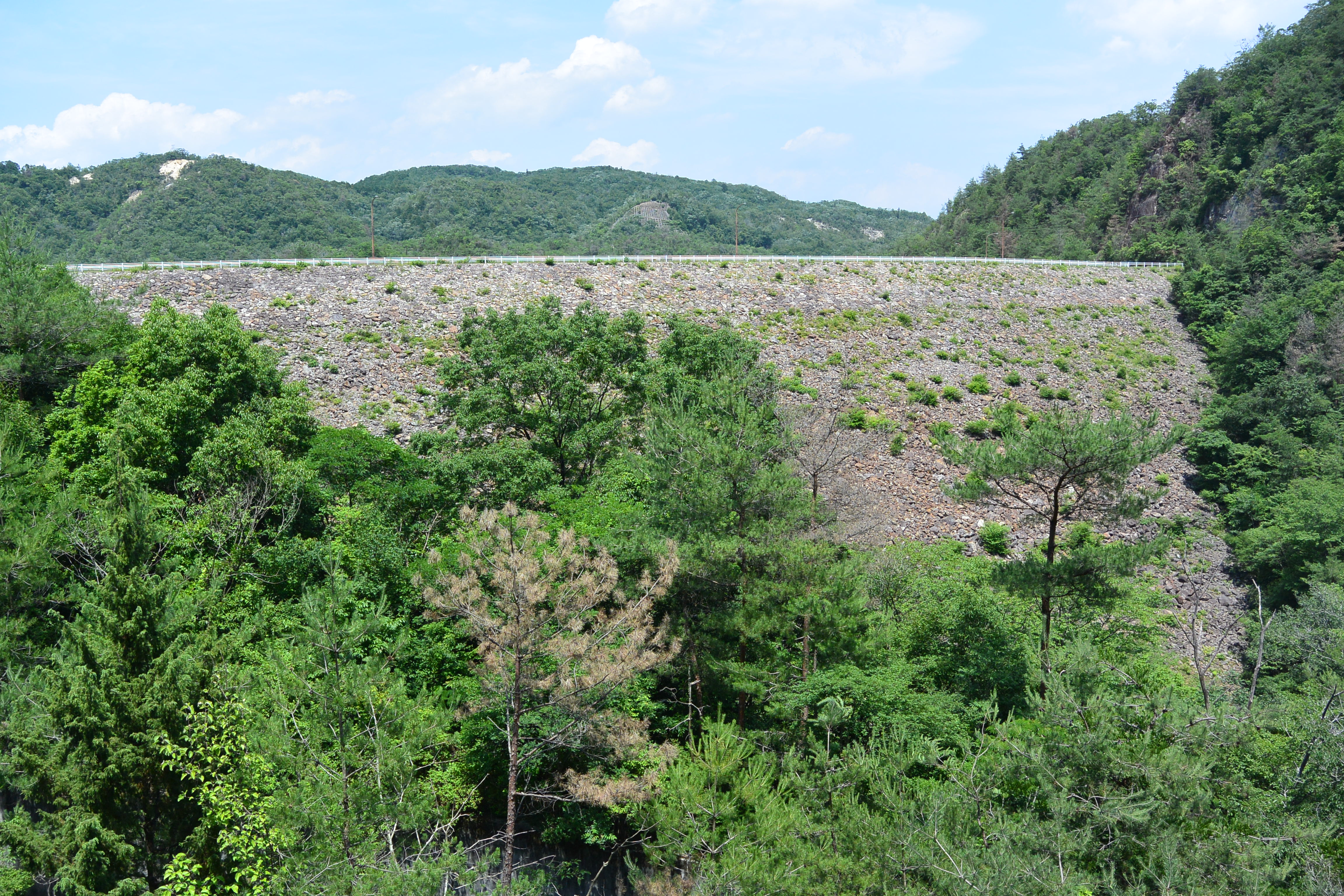

- Location within Japan
- Official name: 川下川ダム
- Location: Hyogo Prefecture, Japan
- Coordinates: 34°51′55″N 135°17′32″E
- Construction began: 1972
- Opening date: 1977

Dam and spillways
- Height: 45 m (148 ft)
- Length: 261.8 m (859 ft)

Reservoir
- Total capacity: 2750 thousand cubic meters
- Catchment area: 27.8 sq. km
- Surface area: 21 hectares

Kawashimogawa Dam (Japanese: 川下川ダム) is a rockfill dam located in Hyogo Prefecture in Japan. The dam is used for water supply. The catchment area of the dam is 27.8 km^{2}. The dam impounds about 21 ha of land when full and can store 2750 thousand cubic meters of water. The construction of the dam was started on 1972 and completed in 1977.

== See also ==
- List of dams in Japan
