= Koike Dam =

Dam in Hyogo Prefecture, Japan

- Location within Japan
- Official name: 小池ダム
- Location: Hyogo Prefecture, Japan
- Coordinates: 34°41′27″N 135°1′27″E
- Construction began: 1988
- Opening date: 1990

Dam and spillways
- Height: 28.5 m (94 ft)
- Length: m

Reservoir
- Total capacity: 64 thousand cubic meters
- Catchment area: 0.3 sq. km

Koike Dam (Japanese: 小池ダム) is an earthfill dam located in Hyogo Prefecture in Japan. The dam is used for flood control and irrigation. The catchment area of the dam is 0.3 km^{2}. The dam can store 64 thousand cubic meters of water. The construction of the dam was started on 1988 and completed in 1990.

== See also ==
- List of dams in Japan
