= Mikumari Dam =

Dam in Hyogo Prefecture, Japan

- Location within Hyōgo Prefecture Location within Japan
- Official name: みくまりダム
- Location: Hyogo Prefecture, Japan
- Coordinates: 35°6′15″N 135°20′55″E
- Construction began: 1993
- Opening date: 2009

Dam and spillways
- Height: 26 m (85 ft)
- Length: 86 m (282 ft)

Reservoir
- Total capacity: 380 thousand cubic meters
- Catchment area: 1.7 sq. km
- Surface area: 6 hectares

Mikumari Dam (Japanese: みくまりダム) is a gravity dam located in Hyogo Prefecture in Japan. The dam is used for flood control and water supply. The catchment area of the dam is 1.7 km^{2}. The dam impounds about 6 ha of land when full and can store 380 thousand cubic meters of water. The construction of the dam was started on 1993 and completed in 2009.

== See also ==
- List of dams in Japan
