= Dainichi Dam =

Dam in Hyogo Prefecture, Japan

- Location within Japan
- Interactive map of Dainichi Dam
- Official name: 大日ダム
- Location: Hyogo Prefecture, Japan
- Coordinates: 34°14′31″N 134°46′17″E
- Construction began: 1980
- Opening date: 1997

Dam and spillways
- Height: 36 m (118 ft)
- Length: 247 m (810 ft)

Reservoir
- Total capacity: 1100 thousand cubic meters
- Catchment area: 6.3 sq. km
- Surface area: 9 hectares

Dainichi Dam (Japanese: 大日ダム) is a gravity dam located in Hyogo Prefecture in Japan. The dam is used for flood control. The catchment area of the dam is 6.3 km^{2}. The dam impounds about 9 ha of land when full and can store 1100 thousand cubic meters of water. The construction of the dam was started on 1980 and completed in 1997.

== See also ==
- List of dams in Japan
