= Yasumuro Dam =

Dam in Hyogo Prefecture, Japan

- Location within Japan
- Official name: 安室ダム
- Location: Hyogo Prefecture, Japan
- Coordinates: 34°52′29″N 134°16′53″E
- Construction began: 1978
- Opening date: 1991

Dam and spillways
- Height: 50 m (160 ft)
- Length: 172 m (564 ft)

Reservoir
- Total capacity: 4,300,000 m^{3} (150,000,000 cu ft)
- Catchment area: 6.4 km^{2} (2.5 sq mi)
- Surface area: 23 hectares (57 acres)

Yasumuro Dam (Japanese: 安室ダム) is a gravity dam located in Hyogo Prefecture in Japan. The dam is used for flood control and water supply. The catchment area of the dam is 6.4 km^{2}. The dam impounds about 23 ha of land when full and can store 4300 thousand cubic meters of water. The construction of the dam was started on 1978 and completed in 1991.

== See also ==
- List of dams in Japan
