= Hachimandani Dam =

Dam in Hyogo Prefecture, Japan

- Location within Hyōgo Prefecture Location within Japan
- Interactive map of Hachimandani Dam
- Official name: 八幡谷ダム
- Location: Hyogo Prefecture, Japan
- Coordinates: 35°3′54″N 135°21′25″E
- Opening date: 1973

Dam and spillways
- Height: 27.5 m (90 ft)
- Length: 103 m (338 ft)

Reservoir
- Total capacity: 742 thousand cubic meters
- Catchment area: 2.5 sq. km
- Surface area: 9 hectares

Hachimandani Dam (Japanese: 八幡谷ダム) is an earthfill dam located in Hyogo Prefecture in Japan. The dam is used for irrigation. The catchment area of the dam is 2.5 km^{2}. The dam impounds about 9 ha of land when full and can store 742 thousand cubic meters of water. The construction of the dam was completed in 1973.

== See also ==
- List of dams in Japan
