= Inohana No.2 Dam =

Dam in Hyogo Prefecture, Japan

- Location within Japan
- Interactive map of Inohana No.2 Dam
- Official name: 猪鼻第２ダム
- Location: Hyogo Prefecture, Japan
- Coordinates: 34°17′20″N 134°52′46″E
- Construction began: 1977
- Opening date: 1978

Dam and spillways
- Height: 41.5 m (136 ft)
- Length: 121.5 m (399 ft)

Reservoir
- Total capacity: 506 thousand cubic meters
- Catchment area: 3.5 sq. km
- Surface area: 4 hectares

Inohana No.2 Dam (Japanese: 猪鼻第２ダム) is a gravity dam located in Hyogo Prefecture in Japan. The dam is used for water supply. The catchment area of the dam is 3.5 km^{2}. The dam impounds about 4 ha of land when full and can store 506 thousand cubic meters of water. The construction of the dam was started on 1977 and completed in 1978.

== See also ==
- List of dams in Japan
