= Funaki-ike Dam =

Dam in Hyogo Prefecture, Japan

- Location within Japan
- Interactive map of Funaki-ike Dam
- Official name: 船木池
- Location: Hyogo Prefecture, Japan
- Coordinates: 34°52′34″N 134°59′25″E
- Construction began: 1947
- Opening date: 1959

Dam and spillways
- Height: 31 m (102 ft)
- Length: 334 m (1,096 ft)

Reservoir
- Total capacity: 1615 thousand cubic meters
- Catchment area: 0.9 sq. km
- Surface area: 16 hectares

Funaki-ike Dam (Japanese: 船木池) is an earthfill dam located in Hyogo Prefecture in Japan. The dam is used for irrigation. The catchment area of the dam is 0.9 km^{2}. The dam impounds about 16 ha of land when full and can store 1615 thousand cubic meters of water. The construction of the dam was started on 1947 and completed in 1959.

== See also ==
- List of dams in Japan
