= Mitakara Dam =

Dam in Hyogo Prefecture, Japan

- Location within Japan
- Official name: 三宝ダム
- Location: Hyogo Prefecture, Japan
- Coordinates: 35°9′25″N 135°11′35″E
- Construction began: 1989
- Opening date: 1994

Dam and spillways
- Height: 35.1 m (115 ft)
- Length: 178 m (584 ft)

Reservoir
- Total capacity: 271 thousand cubic meters
- Catchment area: 1.2 sq. km
- Surface area: 4 hectares

Mitakara Dam (Japanese: 三宝ダム) is a gravity dam located in Hyogo Prefecture in Japan. The dam is used for flood control and water supply. The catchment area of the dam is 1.2 km^{2}. The dam impounds about 4 ha of land when full and can store 271 thousand cubic meters of water. The construction of the dam was started on 1989 and completed in 1994.

== See also ==
- List of dams in Japan
