= Kitafuji Dam =

Dam in Hyogo Prefecture, Japan

- Location within Japan
- Official name: 北富士ダム
- Location: Hyogo Prefecture, Japan
- Coordinates: 34°16′41″N 134°49′06″E
- Construction began: 1981
- Opening date: 1999

Dam and spillways
- Height: 52.5 m (172 ft)
- Length: 162.5 m (533 ft)

Reservoir
- Total capacity: 1300 thousand cubic meters
- Catchment area: 1.7 sq. km
- Surface area: 7 hectares

Kitafuji Dam (Japanese: 北富士ダム) is a gravity dam located in Hyogo Prefecture in Japan. The dam is used for flood control and water supply. The catchment area of the dam is 1.7 km^{2}. The dam impounds about 7 ha of land when full and can store 1300 thousand cubic meters of water. The construction of the dam was started on 1981 and completed in 1999.

== See also ==
- List of dams in Japan
