= Yamada-ike Dam =

Dam in Hyogo Prefecture, Japan

Yamada-ike
- Location within Japan
- Official name: 山田池
- Location: Hyogo Prefecture, Japan
- Coordinates: 34°46′00″N 135°4′42″E
- Opening date: 1932

Dam and spillways
- Height: 27.3 m (90 ft)
- Length: 78 m (256 ft)

Reservoir
- Total capacity: 424,000 m^{3} (15,000,000 cu ft)
- Catchment area: 1.1 km^{2} (0.42 sq mi)
- Surface area: 4 hectares (9.9 acres)

Yamada-ike (Japanese: 山田池) is a gravity dam located in Hyogo Prefecture in Japan. The dam is used for irrigation. The catchment area of the dam is 1.1 km^{2}. The dam impounds about 4 ha of land when full and can store 424 thousand cubic meters of water. The construction of the dam was started on and completed in 1932.

== See also ==
- List of dams in Japan
