= Kurusu-ike Dam =

Dam in Hyogo Prefecture, Japan

- Location within Japan
- Official name: 栗栖池
- Location: Hyogo Prefecture, Japan
- Coordinates: 34°59′08″N 134°28′56″E
- Opening date: 1951

Dam and spillways
- Height: 26.7 m (88 ft)
- Length: 90 m (300 ft)

Reservoir
- Total capacity: 530 thousand cubic meters
- Surface area: 5 hectares

Kurusu-ike Dam (Japanese: 栗栖池) is an earthfill dam in Hyogo Prefecture, Japan. The water from the dam is used for irrigation. When full, the dam impounds 530,000 cubic meters of water in a reservoir with surface area of 5 hectares (12 acres). Construction of the dam was completed in 1951.

== See also ==
- List of dams in Japan
