= Fujioka Dam =

Dam in Hyogo Prefecture, Japan

- Location within Japan
- Interactive map of Fujioka Dam
- Official name: 藤岡ダム
- Location: Hyogo Prefecture, Japan
- Coordinates: 35°6′38″N 135°13′21″E
- Construction began: 1972
- Opening date: 1983

Dam and spillways
- Height: 43.4 m (142 ft)
- Length: 164.6 m (540 ft)

Reservoir
- Total capacity: 870 thousand cubic meters
- Catchment area: 1.9 sq. km
- Surface area: 8 hectares

Fujioka Dam (Japanese: 藤岡ダム) is a rockfill dam located in Hyogo Prefecture in Japan. The dam is used for irrigation. The catchment area of the dam is 1.9 km^{2}. The dam impounds about 8 ha of land when full and can store 870 thousand cubic meters of water. The construction of the dam was started on 1972 and completed in 1983.

== See also ==
- List of dams in Japan
