= Yasutomi Dam =

Dam in Hyogo Prefecture, Japan

- Location within Japan
- Official name: 安富ダム
- Location: Hyogo Prefecture, Japan
- Coordinates: 35°2′41″N 134°36′45″E
- Construction began: 1970
- Opening date: 1985

Dam and spillways
- Height: 50.5 m (166 ft)
- Length: 145 m (476 ft)

Reservoir
- Total capacity: 2,950,000 m^{3} (104,000,000 cu ft)
- Catchment area: 15.5 km^{2} (6.0 sq mi)
- Surface area: 19 hectares (47 acres)

Yasutomi Dam (Japanese: 安富ダム) is a gravity dam located in Hyogo Prefecture in Japan. The dam is used for flood control. The catchment area of the dam is 15.5 km^{2}. The dam impounds about 19 ha of land when full and can store 2950 thousand cubic meters of water. The construction of the dam was started on 1970 and completed in 1985.

== See also ==
- List of dams in Japan
