= Ohta No.2 Dam =

Dam in Hyogo Prefecture, Japan

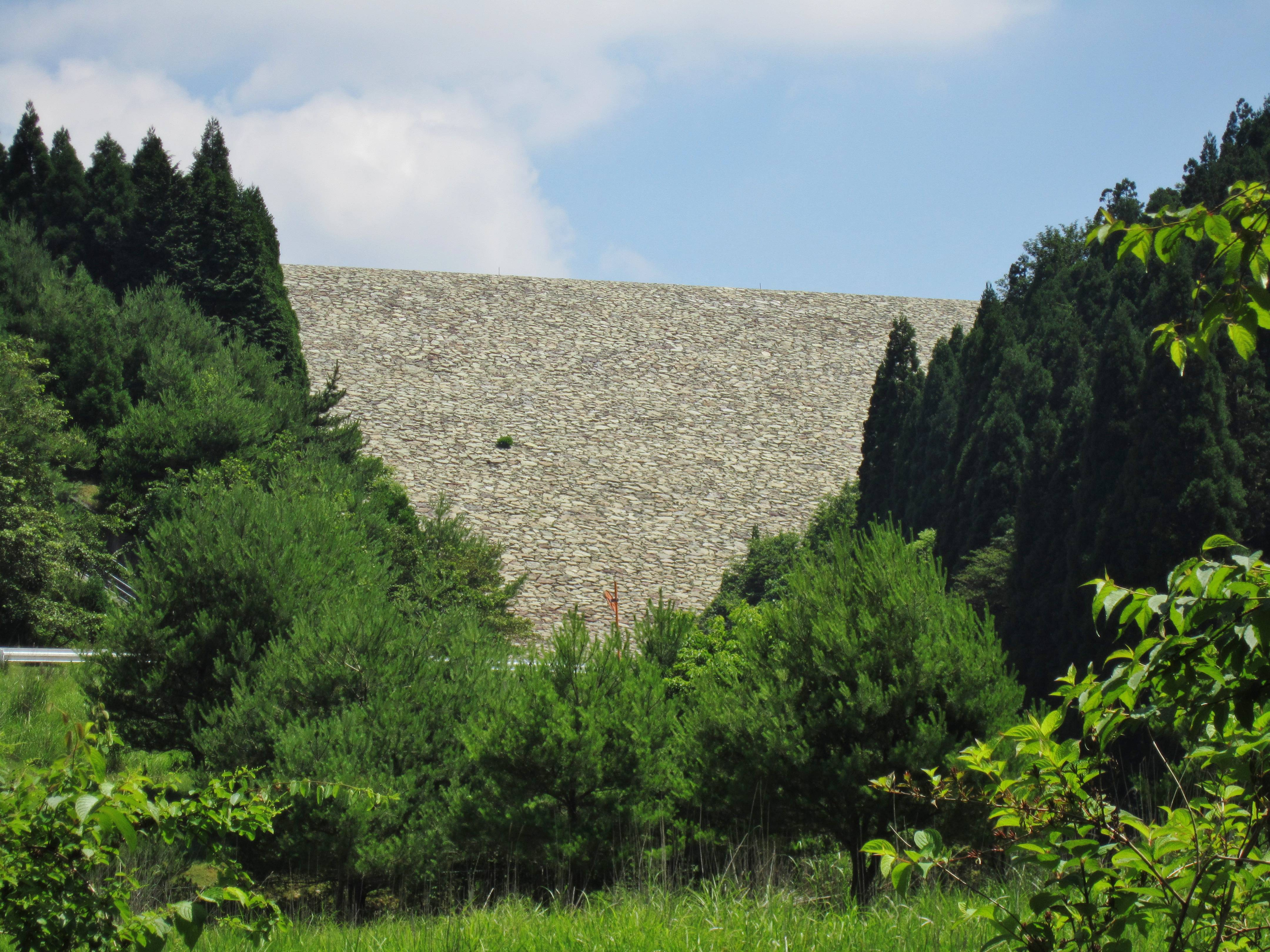

- Location within Japan
- Official name: 太田第二ダム
- Location: Hyogo Prefecture, Japan
- Coordinates: 35°7′23″N 134°42′06″E
- Construction began: 1980
- Opening date: 1995

Dam and spillways
- Height: 44.5 m (146 ft)
- Length: 397.1 m (1,303 ft)

Reservoir
- Total capacity: 9,313,000 m^{3} (328,900,000 cu ft)
- Catchment area: 1.6 km^{2} (0.62 sq mi)
- Surface area: 64 hectares (160 acres)

Ohta No.2 Dam (Japanese: 太田第二ダム) is a rockfill dam located in Hyogo Prefecture in Japan. The dam is used for power production. The catchment area of the dam is 1.6 km^{2}. The dam impounds about 64 ha of land when full and can store 9313 thousand cubic meters of water. The construction of the dam was started on 1980 and completed in 1995.

== See also ==
- List of dams in Japan
