= Kakinokidani-ike Dam =

Dam in Hyogo Prefecture, Japan

- Location within Japan
- Interactive map of Kakinokidani-ike Dam
- Official name: 柿ノ木谷池ダム
- Location: Hyogo Prefecture, Japan
- Coordinates: 34°18′35″N 134°42′56″E
- Construction began: 1994
- Opening date: 2006

Dam and spillways
- Height: 25.1 m (82 ft)
- Length: 117 m (384 ft)

Reservoir
- Total capacity: 386,000 cubic meters
- Surface area: 5 hectares

Kakinokidani-ike Dam (Japanese: 柿ノ木谷池ダム) is a gravity dam located in Hyogo Prefecture in Japan. The dam is used for flood control and irrigation. The dam impounds about 5 hectares (50,000 square meters) of land when full and can store 386,000 cubic meters of water. The construction of the dam was started on 1994 and completed in 2006.

== See also ==
- List of dams in Japan
