= Aono Dam =

Dam in Hyogo Prefecture, Japan

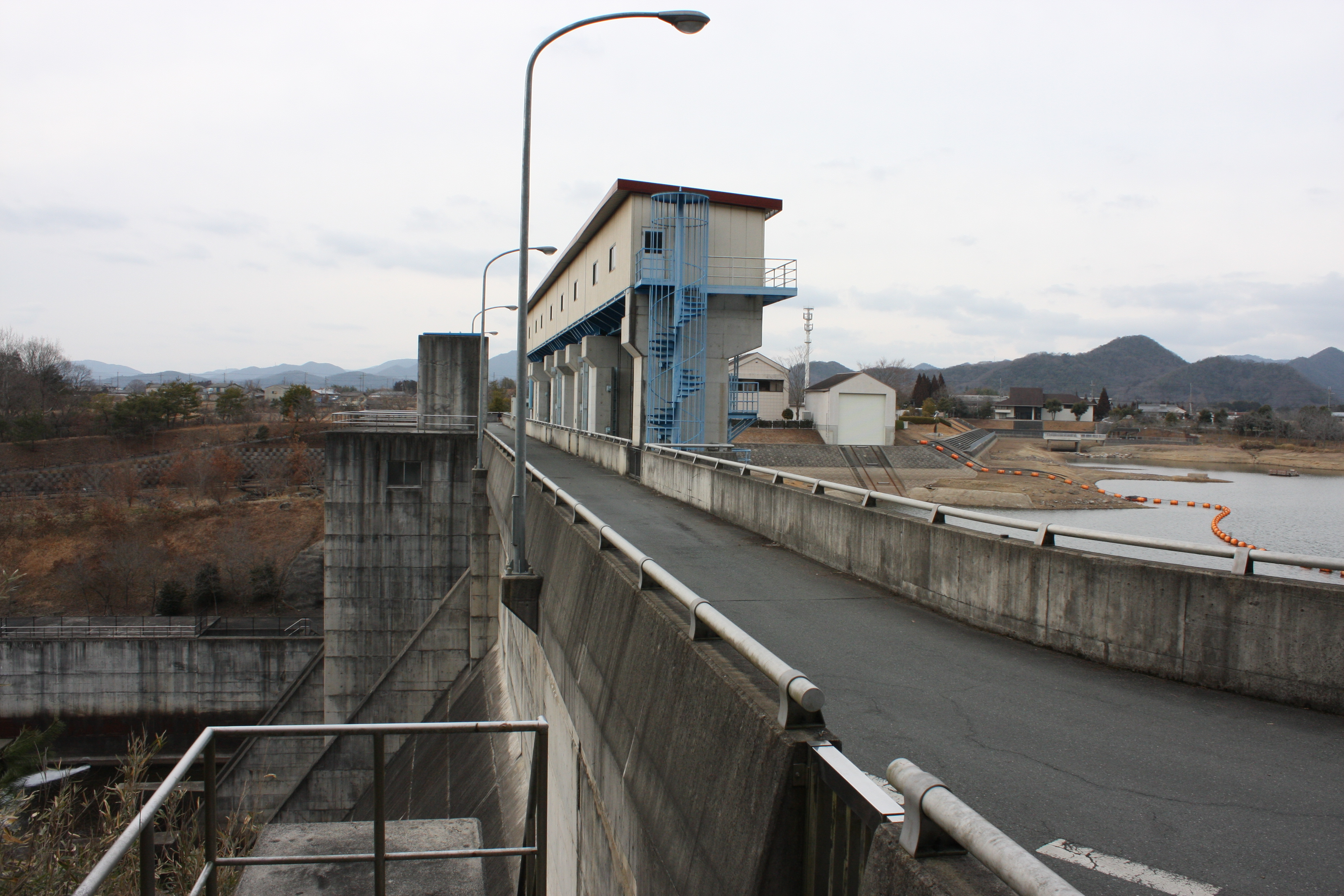

- Location within Japan
- Interactive map of Aono Dam
- Official name: 青野ダム
- Location: Hyogo Prefecture, Japan
- Coordinates: 34°56′01″N 135°12′27″E
- Construction began: 1968
- Opening date: 1987

Dam and spillways
- Height: 29 m (95 ft)
- Length: 286 m (938 ft)

Reservoir
- Total capacity: 15100 thousand cubic meters
- Catchment area: 51.8 sq. km
- Surface area: 215 hectares

Aono Dam (Japanese: 青野ダム) is a gravity dam located in Hyogo Prefecture in Japan. The dam is used for flood control and water supply. The catchment area of the dam is 51.8 km^{2}. The dam impounds about 215 ha of land when full and can store 15100 thousand cubic meters of water. The construction of the dam was started on 1968 and completed in 1987.

== See also ==
- List of dams in Japan
