= Kitayama No.4 Dam =

Dam in Hyogo Prefecture, Japan

- Location within Japan
- Official name: 北山第４ダム
- Location: Hyogo Prefecture, Japan
- Coordinates: 34°46′27″N 135°19′23″E
- Construction began: 1965
- Opening date: 1968

Dam and spillways
- Height: 16 m (52 ft)
- Length: 155 m (509 ft)

Reservoir
- Total capacity: 1185 thousand cubic meters
- Catchment area: 5 sq. km
- Surface area: 13 hectares

Kitayama No.4 Dam (Japanese: 北山第４ダム) is an earthfill dam located in Hyogo Prefecture in Japan. The dam is used for water supply. The catchment area of the dam is 5 km^{2}. The dam impounds about 13 ha of land when full and can store 1185 thousand cubic meters of water. The construction of the dam was started on 1965 and completed in 1968.

== See also ==
- List of dams in Japan
