= Mirotani Dam =

Dam in Hyogo Prefecture, Japan

- Location within Japan
- Official name: 室谷ダム
- Location: Hyogo Prefecture, Japan
- Coordinates: 34°42′12″N 135°2′38″E
- Construction began: 1986
- Opening date: 1987

Dam and spillways
- Height: 30 m (98 ft)
- Length: 126 m (413 ft)

Reservoir
- Total capacity: 101 thousand cubic meters
- Catchment area: 0.4 sq. km
- Surface area: 9 hectares

Mirotani Dam (Japanese: 室谷ダム) is an earthfill dam located in Hyogo Prefecture in Japan. The dam is used for flood control and irrigation. The catchment area of the dam is 0.4 km^{2}. The dam impounds about 9 ha of land when full and can store 101 thousand cubic meters of water. The construction of the dam was started on 1986 and completed in 1987.

== See also ==
- List of dams in Japan
