= Nunobiki Dam =

Dam in Hyōgo Prefecture, Japan

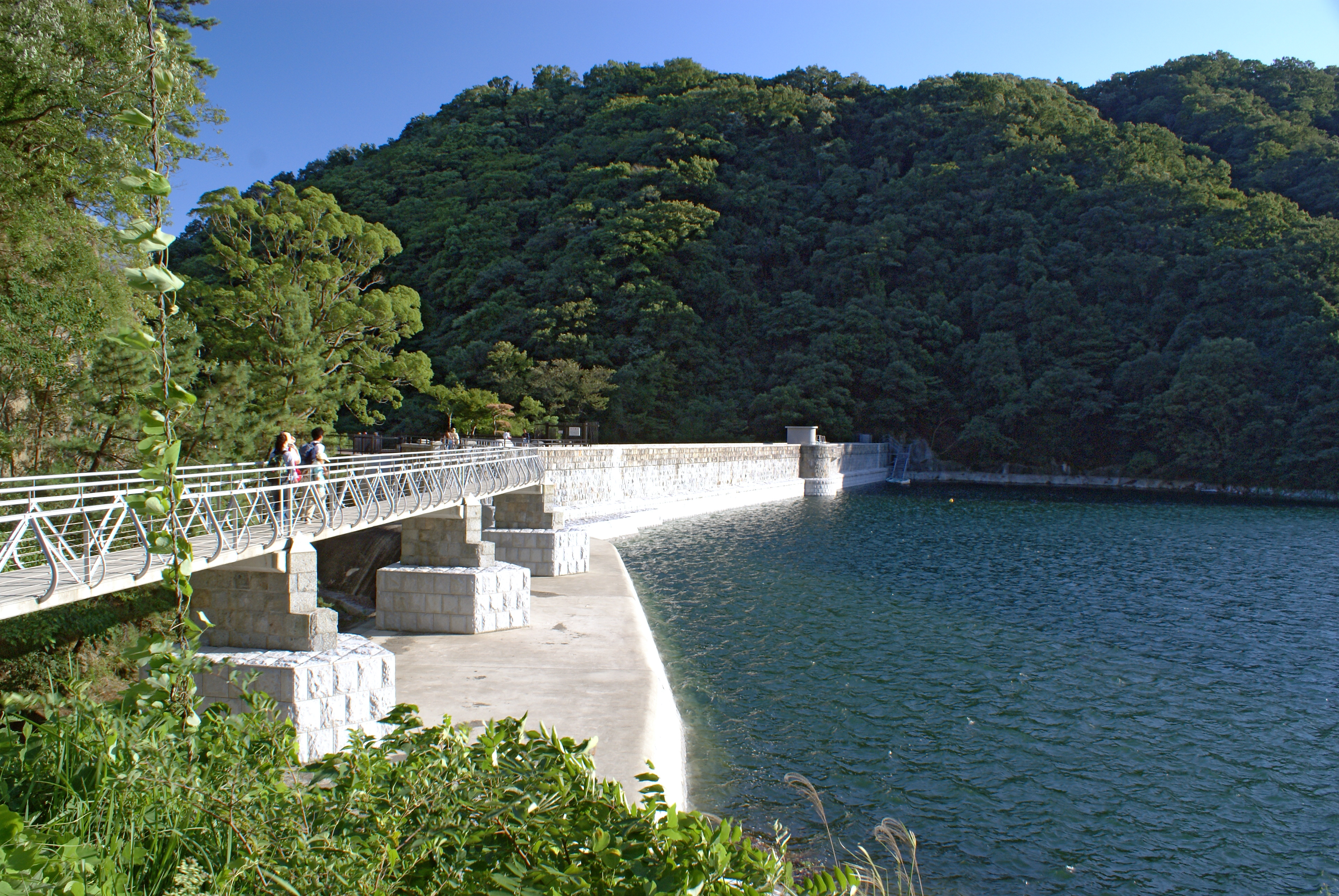
- Interactive map of Nunobiki Dam
- Location: Kobe, Hyōgo Prefecture, Japan.
- Coordinates: 34°42′40″N 135°11′25″E
- Construction began: 1897
- Opening date: 1900

Dam and spillways
- Height: 33.3 m
- Length: 110.3 m

Reservoir
- Total capacity: 417,000 m^{3}
- Catchment area: 10.7 km^{2}
- Surface area: 4.8 hectares

Nunobiki Dam is a dam in Kobe, in Hyōgo Prefecture of Japan. It is the first concrete gravity dam in Japan. It is situated in Chuo-ku, Kobe, at the foot of the mountain stream Nunohiki and waterfall of the same name. In 2006 with the modernization of water resources and water supply, the dam was designated as important heritage site.

== History ==
The modern water supply plan in Japan was originally drawn up in 1887 but in 1892, Professor William Barton from the British Ministry of Engineering proposed an earth-fill dam with a reservoir capacity of about 31 million tons. Construction began in 1897 and it was completed in 1900. In 2005, the dam was partly reconstructed to incorporate seismic strengthening and sediment dredging was completed.

== Gallery ==
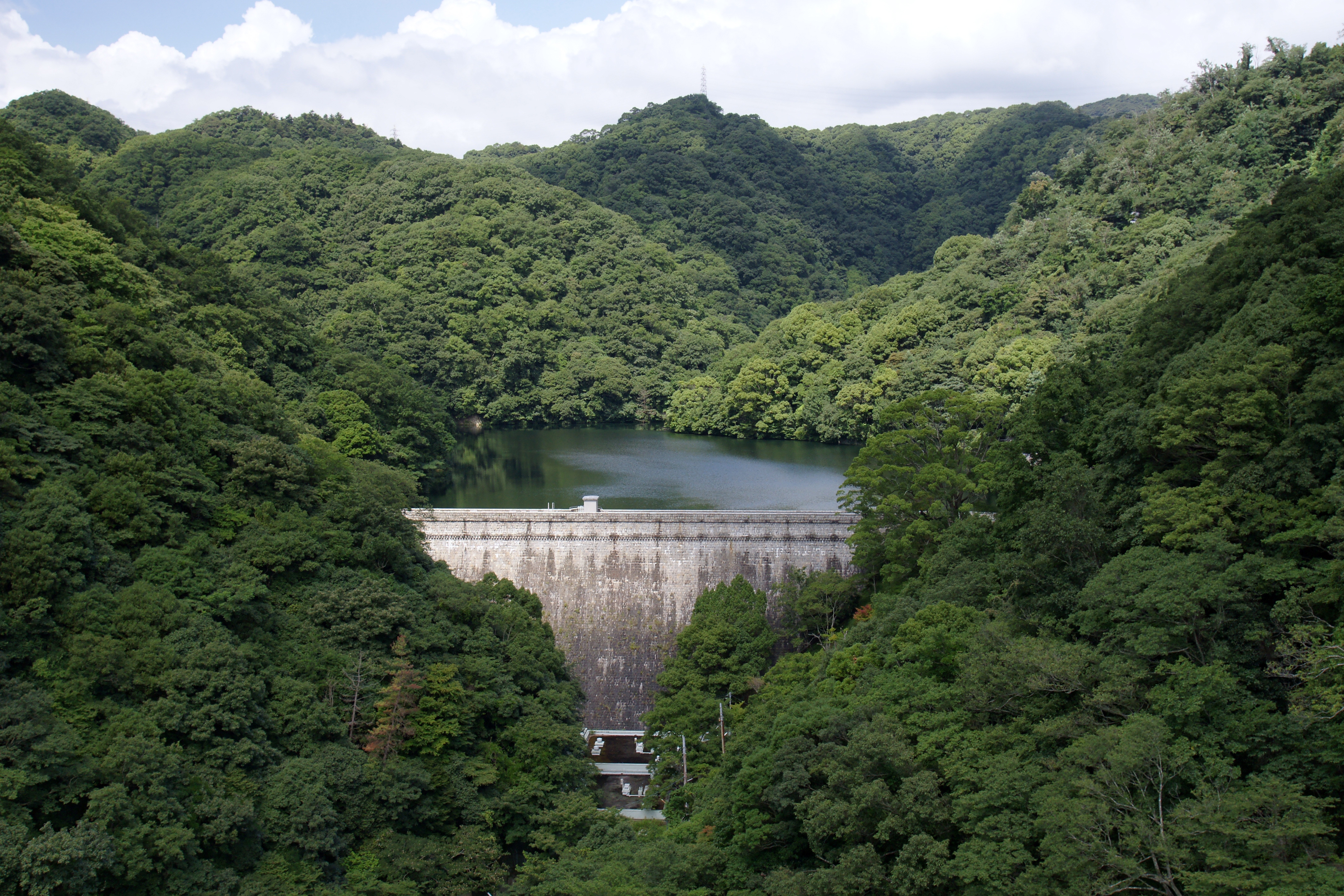

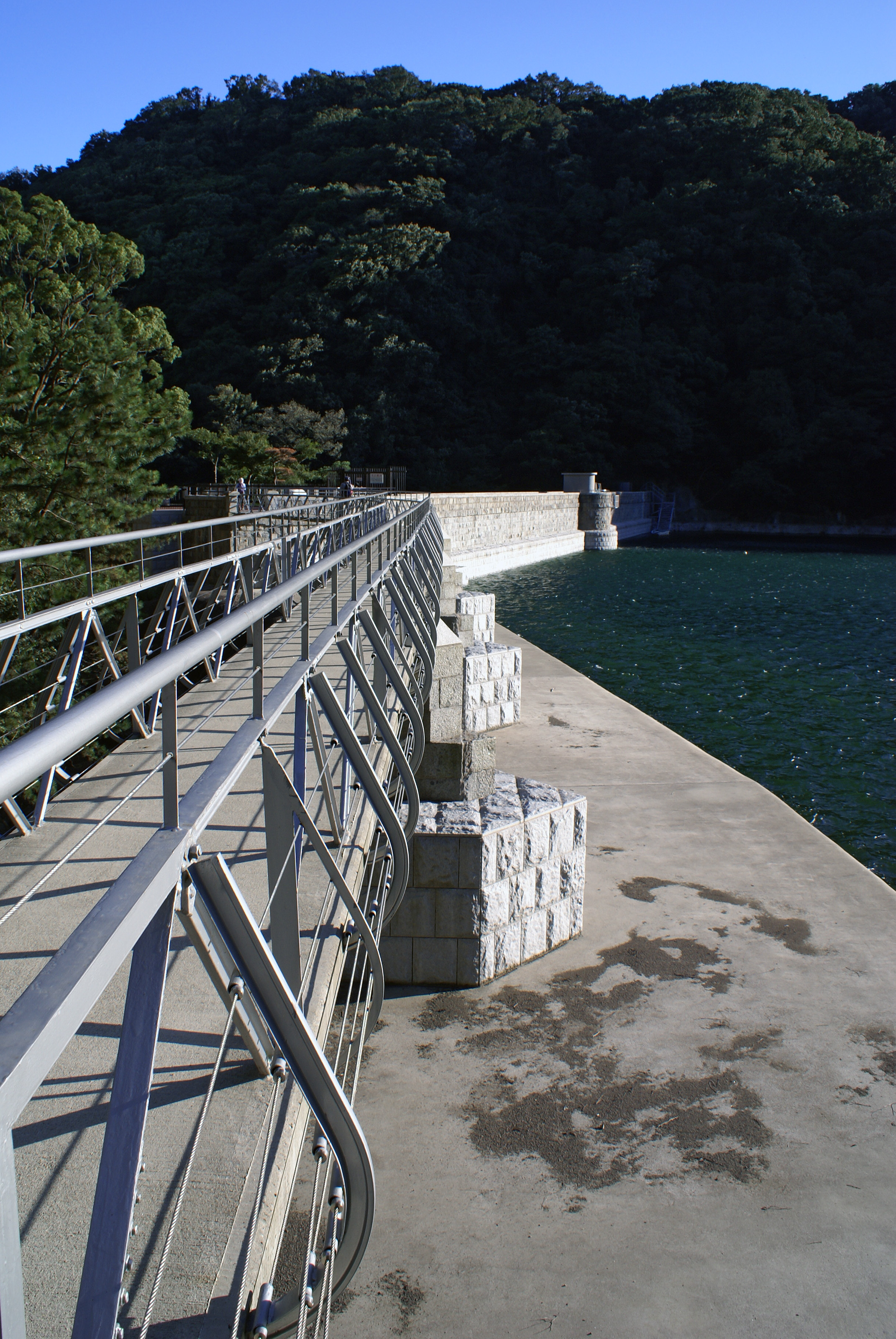

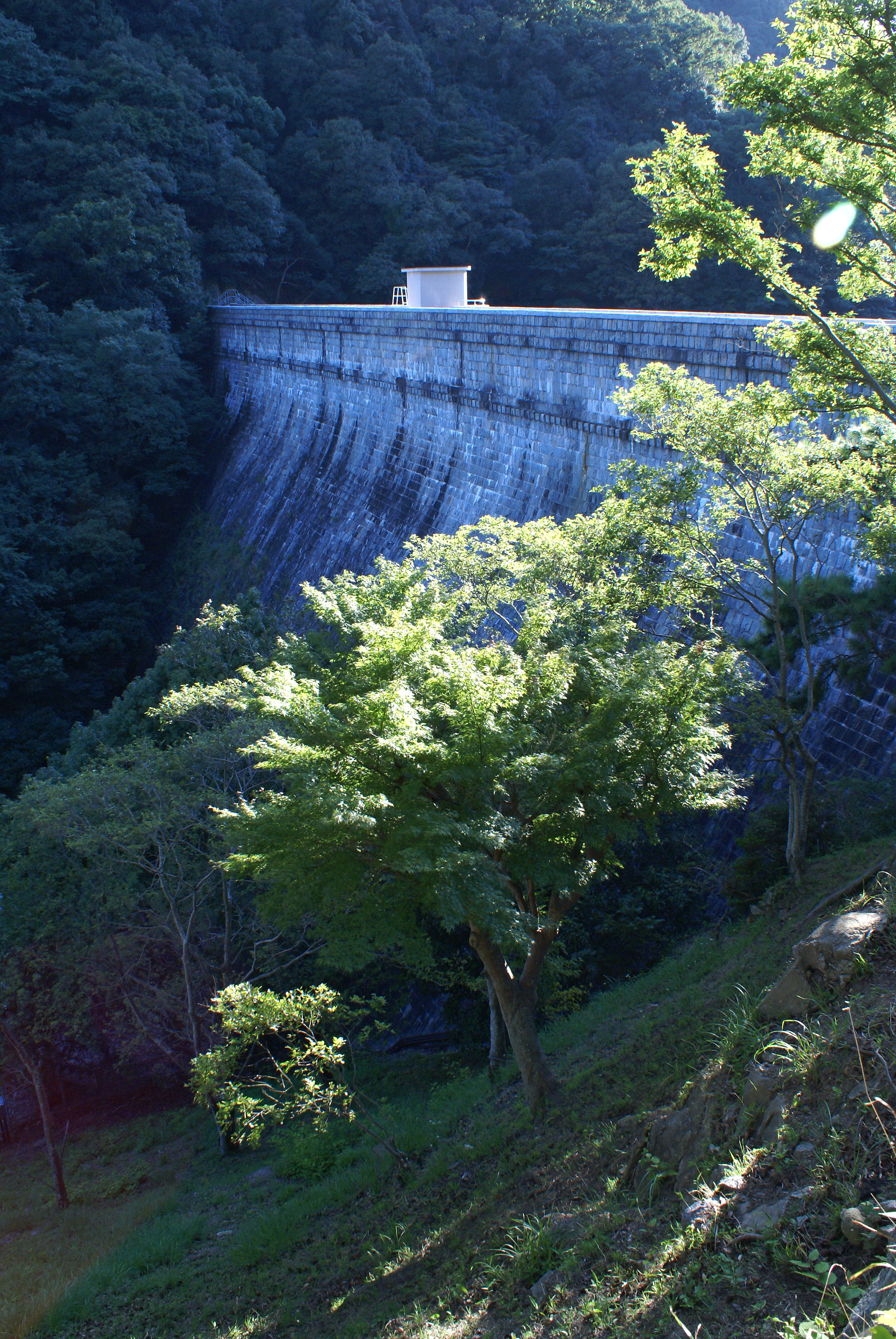

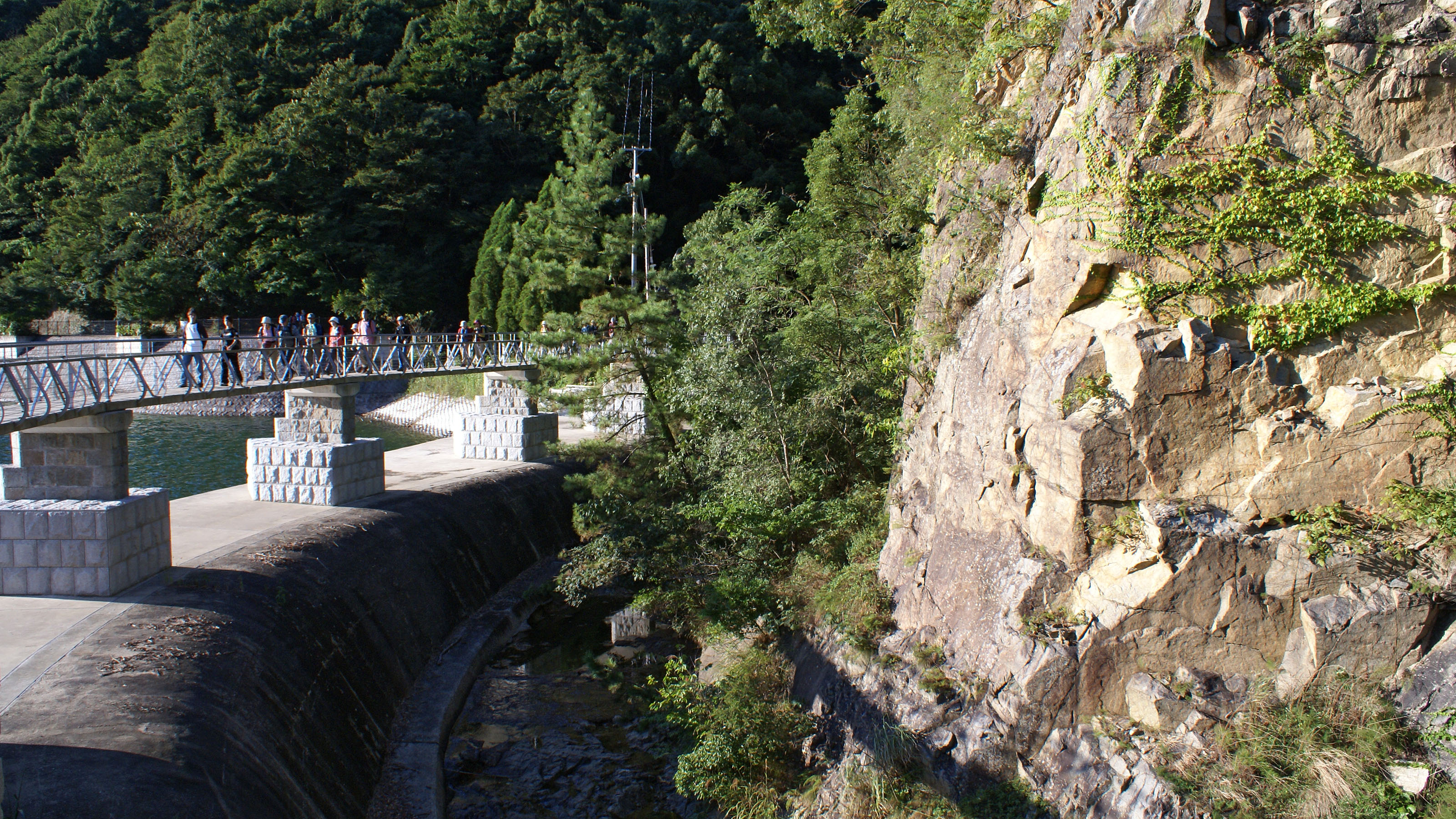

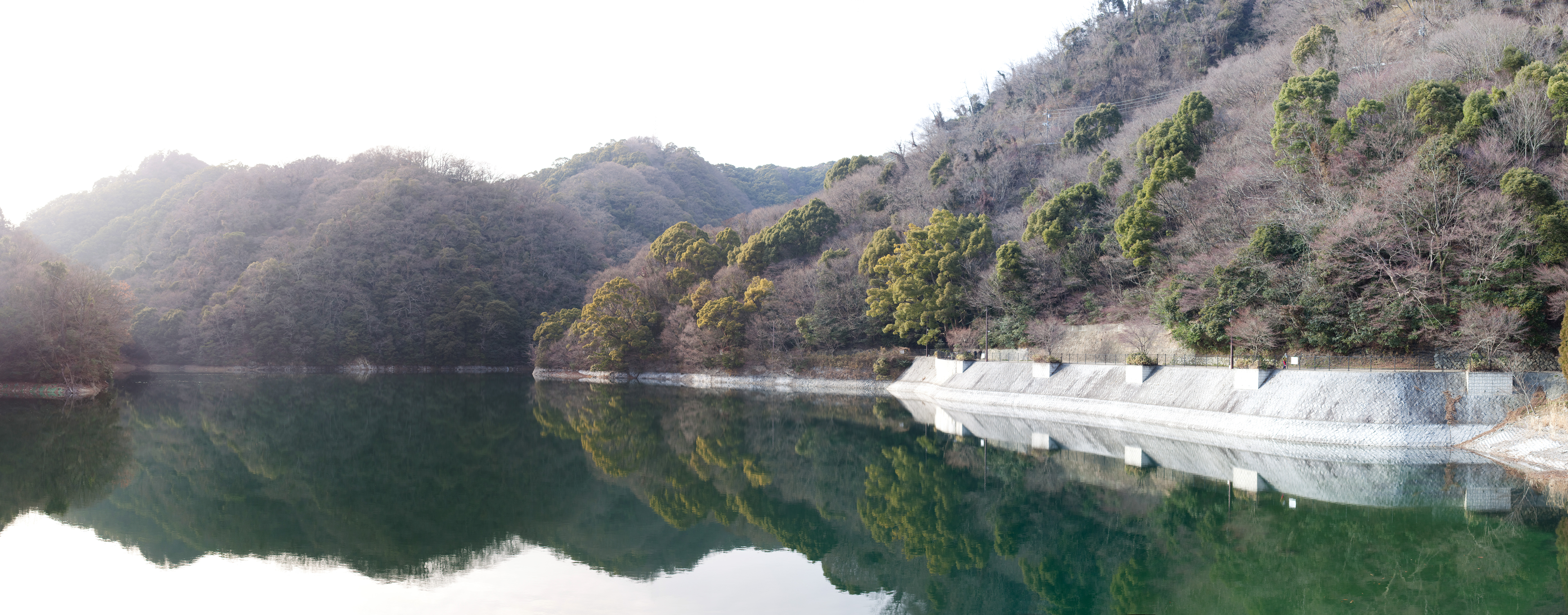

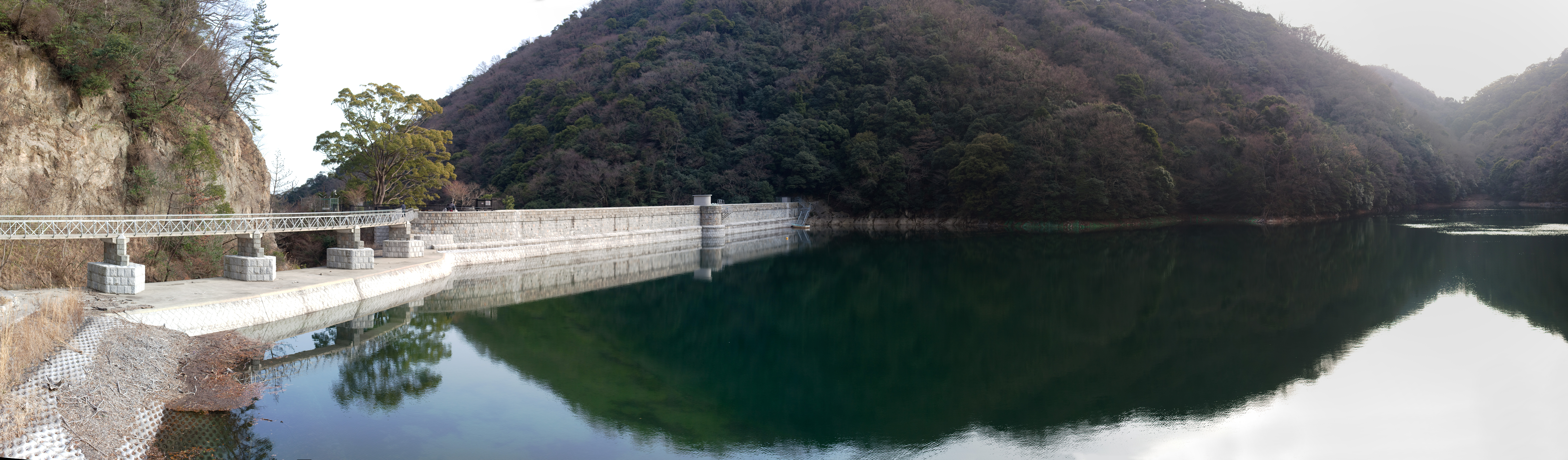
