= Kanaji Dam =

Dam in Hyogo Prefecture, Japan

- Location within Japan
- Interactive map of Kanaji Dam
- Official name: 金出地ダム
- Location: Hyogo Prefecture, Japan
- Coordinates: 34°55′40″N 134°25′25″E
- Construction began: 1986
- Opening date: 2015

Dam and spillways
- Height: 62.3 m (204 ft)
- Length: 184 m (604 ft)

Reservoir
- Total capacity: 4700 thousand cubic meters
- Catchment area: 11.5 sq. km
- Surface area: 22 hectares

Kanaji Dam (Japanese: 金出地ダム) is a gravity dam located in Hyogo Prefecture in Japan. The dam is used for flood control. The catchment area of the dam is 11.5 km^{2}. The dam impounds about 22 ha of land when full and can store 4700 thousand cubic meters of water. The construction of the dam was started on 1986 and completed in 2015.

== See also ==
- List of dams in Japan
