= Kamogawa Dam =

Dam in Hyogo Prefecture, Japan

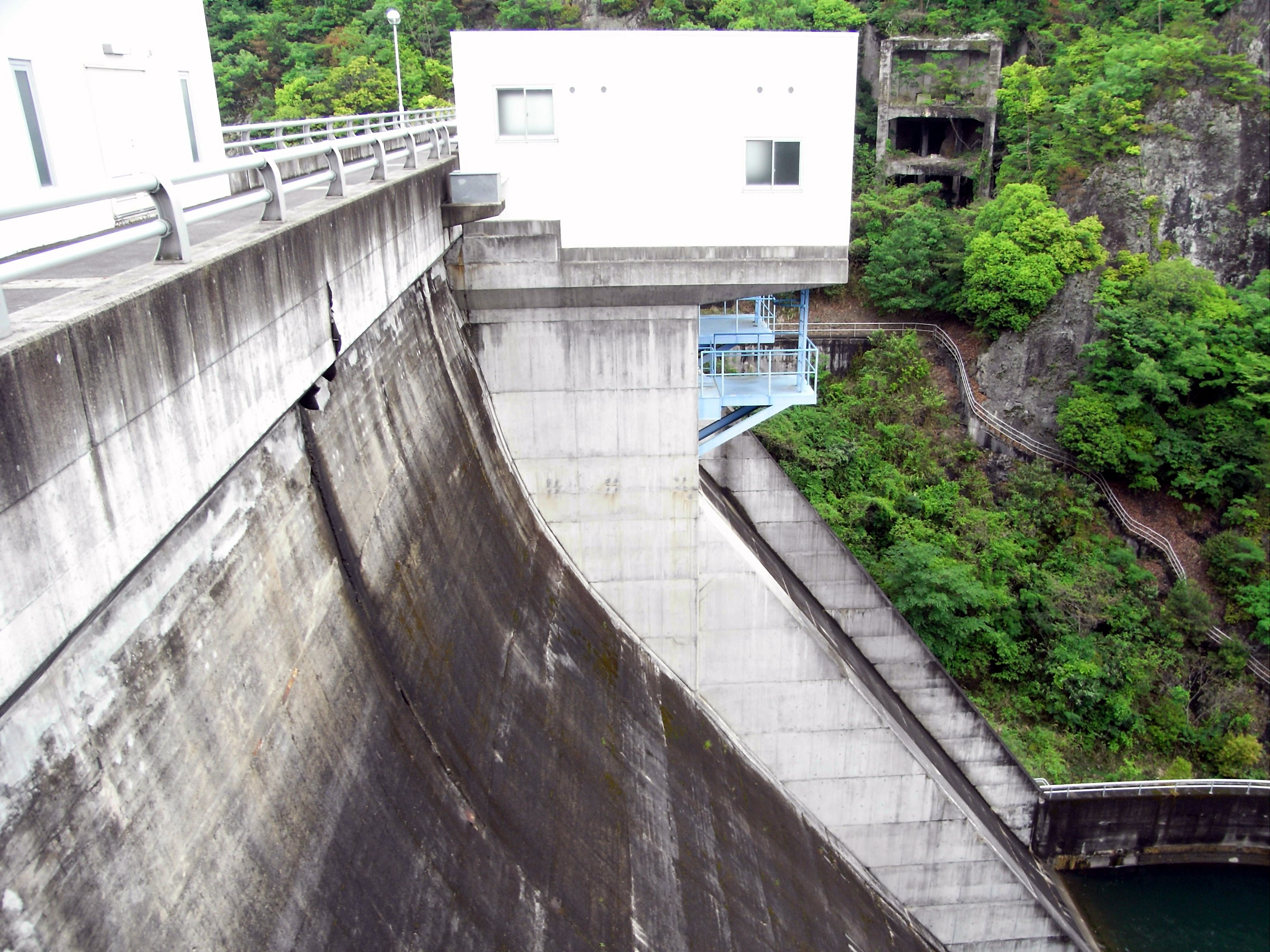

- Location within Japan
- Interactive map of Kamogawa Dam
- Official name: 鴨川ダム
- Location: Hyogo Prefecture, Japan
- Coordinates: 34°55′48″N 135°4′21″E
- Construction began: 1947
- Opening date: 1951

Dam and spillways
- Height: 42.2 m (138 ft)
- Length: 97.1 m (319 ft)

Reservoir
- Total capacity: 8675 thousand cubic meters
- Catchment area: 79.2 sq. km
- Surface area: 54 hectares

Kamogawa Dam (Japanese: 鴨川ダム) is a gravity dam located in Hyogo Prefecture in Japan. The dam is used for irrigation. The catchment area of the dam is 79.2 km^{2}. The dam impounds about 54 ha of land when full and can store 8675 thousand cubic meters of water. The construction of the dam was started on 1947 and completed in 1951.

== See also ==
- List of dams in Japan
