= Minamitaniguchi Dam =

Dam in Hyogo Prefecture, Japan

- Location within Japan
- Official name: 南谷口ダム
- Location: Hyogo Prefecture, Japan
- Coordinates: 34°41′45″N 135°1′01″E
- Construction began: 1992
- Opening date: 1994

Dam and spillways
- Height: 22.1 m (73 ft)
- Length: 153 m (502 ft)

Reservoir
- Total capacity: 76 thousand cubic meters
- Catchment area: 0.6 sq. km

Minamitaniguchi Dam (Japanese: 南谷口ダム) is an earthfill dam located in Hyogo Prefecture in Japan. The dam is used for flood control and irrigation. The catchment area of the dam is 0.6 km^{2}. The dam can store 76 thousand cubic meters of water. The construction of the dam was started on 1992 and completed in 1994.

== See also ==
- List of dams in Japan
