= Kuroishi Dam =

Dam in Hyogo Prefecture, Japan

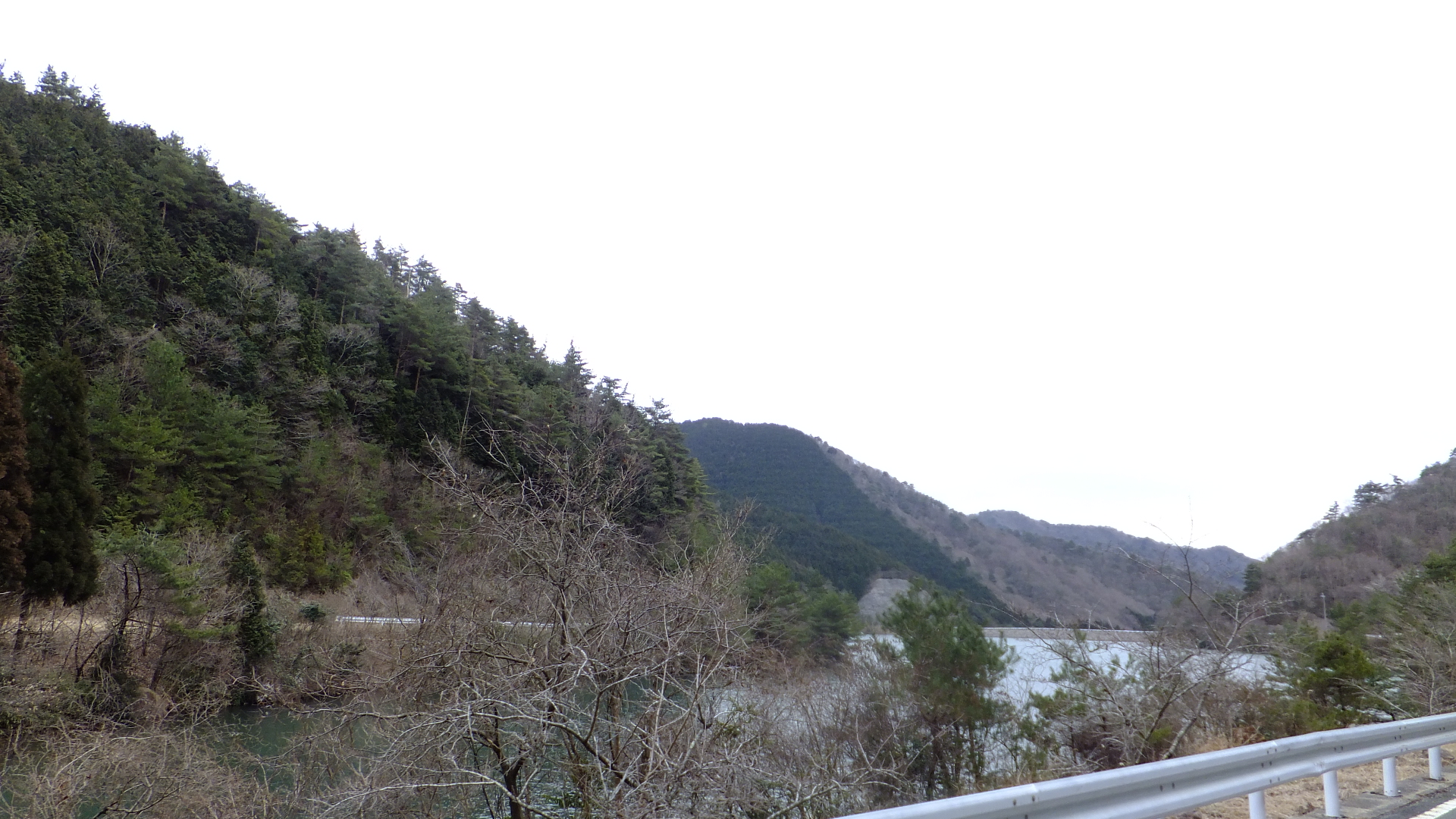

- Location within Japan
- Official name: 黒石ダム
- Location: Hyogo Prefecture, Japan
- Coordinates: 35°2′49″N 135°6′28″E
- Construction began: 1973
- Opening date: 1976

Dam and spillways
- Height: 29.6 m (97 ft)
- Length: 170 m (560 ft)

Reservoir
- Total capacity: 720 thousand cubic meters
- Catchment area: 2.6 sq. km
- Surface area: 8 hectares

Kuroishi Dam (Japanese: 黒石ダム) is an earthfill dam located in Hyogo Prefecture in Japan. The dam is used for irrigation. The catchment area of the dam is 2.6 km^{2}. The dam impounds about 8 ha of land when full and can store 720 thousand cubic meters of water. The construction of the dam was started on 1973 and completed in 1976.

== See also ==
- List of dams in Japan
