= Ohro Dam =

Dam in Hyogo Prefecture, Japan

- Location within Japan
- Official name: 大路ダム
- Location: Hyogo Prefecture, Japan
- Coordinates: 35°17′24″N 134°49′04″E
- Construction began: 1990
- Opening date: 1998

Dam and spillways
- Height: 32.1 m (105 ft)
- Length: 138 m (453 ft)

Reservoir
- Total capacity: 375,000 m^{3} (13,200,000 cu ft)
- Catchment area: 3.1 km^{2} (1.2 sq mi)
- Surface area: 4 hectares (9.9 acres)

Ohro Dam (Japanese: 大路ダム) is a gravity dam located in Hyogo Prefecture in Japan. The dam is used for flood control and water supply. The catchment area of the dam is 3.1 km^{2}. The dam impounds about 4 ha of land when full and can store 375 thousand cubic meters of water. The construction of the dam was started on 1990 and completed in 1998.

== See also ==
- List of dams in Japan
