= Fukatani Dam =

Dam in Hyogo Prefecture, Japan

- Location within Japan
- Interactive map of Fukatani Dam
- Official name: 深谷ダム
- Location: Hyogo Prefecture, Japan
- Coordinates: 34°47′06″N 135°19′51″E
- Construction began: 1969
- Opening date: 1971

Dam and spillways
- Height: 41 m (135 ft)
- Length: 497 m (1,631 ft)

Reservoir
- Total capacity: 1095 thousand cubic meters
- Catchment area: 4.9 sq. km
- Surface area: 8 hectares

Fukatani Dam (Japanese: 深谷ダム) is an earthfill dam located in Hyogo Prefecture in Japan. The dam is used for water supply. The catchment area of the dam is 4.9 km^{2}. The dam impounds about 8 ha of land when full and can store 1095 thousand cubic meters of water. The construction of the dam was started on 1969 and completed in 1971.

== See also ==
- List of dams in Japan
