= Ohta No.3 Dam =

Dam in Hyogo Prefecture, Japan

- Location within Japan
- Official name: 太田第三ダム
- Location: Hyogo Prefecture, Japan
- Coordinates: 35°7′46″N 134°42′17″E
- Construction began: 1980
- Opening date: 1995

Dam and spillways
- Height: 23.5 m (77 ft)
- Length: 208 m (682 ft)

Reservoir
- Total capacity: 9,313,000 m^{3} (328,900,000 cu ft)
- Catchment area: 1.6 km^{2} (0.62 sq mi)
- Surface area: 64 hectares (160 acres)

Ohta No.3 Dam (Japanese: 太田第三ダム) is a rockfill dam located in Hyogo Prefecture, Japan. It is used for power production. The dam's catchment area is 1.6 km^{2}. When full, it impounds approximately 64 hectares of land and can store 9,313 thousand cubic meters of water. The construction of the dam was started on 1980 and completed in 1995.

== See also ==
- List of dams in Japan
