= Tanto Dam =

Dam in Hyogo Prefecture, Japan

- Location within Japan
- Official name: 但東ダム
- Location: Hyogo Prefecture, Japan
- Coordinates: 35°29′11″N 135°0′16″E
- Construction began: 1992
- Opening date: 2006

Dam and spillways
- Height: 25.7 m (84 ft)
- Length: 120 m (390 ft)

Reservoir
- Total capacity: 470,000 m^{3} (17,000,000 cu ft)
- Catchment area: 1.3 km^{2} (0.50 sq mi)
- Surface area: 7 hectares (17 acres)

Tanto Dam (Japanese: 但東ダム) is a gravity dam located in Hyogo Prefecture in Japan. The dam is used for flood control and water supply. The catchment area of the dam is 1.3 km^{2}. The dam impounds about 7 ha of land when full and can store 470 thousand cubic meters of water. The construction of the dam was started on 1992 and completed in 2006.

== See also ==
- List of dams in Japan
