= Tokiwa Dam (Hyōgo) =

Dam in Hyogo Prefecture, Japan

- Location within Japan
- Official name: 常盤ダム
- Location: Hyogo Prefecture, Japan
- Coordinates: 34°33′13″N 134°57′18″E
- Construction began: 1972
- Opening date: 1974

Dam and spillways
- Height: 33.5 m (110 ft)
- Length: 94.6 m (310 ft)

Reservoir
- Total capacity: 669,000 m^{3} (23,600,000 cu ft)
- Catchment area: 4 km^{2} (1.5 sq mi)
- Surface area: 10 hectares (25 acres)

Tokiwa Dam (Japanese: 常盤ダム) is an earthfill dam located in Hyogo Prefecture in Japan. The dam is used for irrigation. The catchment area of the dam is 4 km^{2}. The dam impounds about 10 ha of land when full and can store 669 thousand cubic meters of water. The construction of the dam was started on 1972 and completed in 1974.

== See also ==
- List of dams in Japan
