= Ushiuchi Dam =

Dam in Hyogo Prefecture, Japan

- Location within Japan
- Official name: 牛内ダム
- Location: Hyogo Prefecture, Japan
- Coordinates: 34°15′02″N 134°47′23″E
- Construction began: 1980
- Opening date: 1997

Dam and spillways
- Height: 59 m (194 ft)
- Length: 216 m (709 ft)

Reservoir
- Total capacity: 2,200,000 m^{3} (78,000,000 cu ft)
- Catchment area: 4.4 km^{2} (1.7 sq mi)
- Surface area: 13 hectares (32 acres)

Ushiuchi Dam (Japanese: 牛内ダム) is a gravity dam located in Hyogo Prefecture in Japan. The dam is used for flood control and water supply. The catchment area of the dam is 4.4 km^{2}. The dam impounds about 13 ha of land when full and can store 2200 thousand cubic meters of water. The construction of the dam was started on 1980 and completed in 1997.

== See also ==
- List of dams in Japan
