= Nagaidani Dam =

Dam in Hyogo Prefecture, Japan

- Location within Japan
- Official name: 永井谷ダム
- Location: Hyōgo Prefecture, Japan
- Coordinates: 34°41′45″N 135°1′49″E
- Construction began: 1982
- Opening date: 1983

Dam and spillways
- Height: 25.3 m (83 ft)
- Length: 160 m (520 ft)

Reservoir
- Total capacity: 129 thousand cubic meters
- Catchment area: 0.4 sq. km
- Surface area: 8 hectares

Nagaidani Dam (Japanese: 永井谷ダム) is an earthfill dam located in Hyōgo Prefecture in Japan. The dam is used for flood control and irrigation. The catchment area of the dam is 0.4 km^{2}. The dam impounds about 8 ha of land when full and can store 129 thousand cubic meters of water. The construction of the dam was started on 1982 and completed in 1983.

== See also ==
- List of dams in Japan
