= Sugo Dam (Hyōgo) =

Dam in Hyogo Prefecture, Japan

- Location within Japan
- Official name: 菅生ダム（再）
- Location: Hyogo Prefecture, Japan
- Coordinates: 35°0′05″N 134°38′01″E
- Construction began: 2005
- Opening date: 2010

Dam and spillways
- Height: 55.7 m (183 ft)
- Length: 157 m (515 ft)

Reservoir
- Total capacity: 1,950,000 m^{3} (69,000,000 cu ft)
- Catchment area: 8.7 km^{2} (3.4 sq mi)
- Surface area: 13 hectares (32 acres)

Sugo Dam (Japanese: 菅生ダム（再）) is a gravity dam located in Hyogo Prefecture in Japan. The dam is used for flood control. The catchment area of the dam is 8.7 square kilometres (3.4 sq mi). The dam impounds about 13 hectares (32 acres) of land when full and can store 1,950,000 cubic metres (69,000,000 cu ft) of water. The construction of the dam was started on 2005 and completed in 2010.

== See also ==
- List of dams in Japan
