= Hatsuogawa Dam =

Dam in Hyogo Prefecture, Japan

- Location within Japan
- Interactive map of Hatsuogawa Dam
- Official name: 初尾川ダム
- Location: Hyogo Prefecture, Japan
- Coordinates: 34°17′40″N 134°49′53″E
- Opening date: 1968

Dam and spillways
- Height: 31.2 m (102 ft)
- Length: 101 m (331 ft)

Reservoir
- Total capacity: 302 thousand cubic meters
- Catchment area: 3.2 sq. km
- Surface area: 6 hectares

Hatsuogawa Dam (Japanese: 初尾川ダム) is a gravity dam located in Hyogo Prefecture in Japan. The dam is used for irrigation. The catchment area of the dam is 3.2 km^{2}. The dam impounds about 6 ha of land when full and can store 302 thousand cubic meters of water. The construction of the dam was completed in 1968.

== See also ==
- List of dams in Japan
