= Ohsugi Dam =

Dam in Hyogo Prefecture, Japan

- Location within Japan
- Official name: 大杉ダム
- Location: Hyogo Prefecture, Japan
- Coordinates: 35°14′38″N 135°6′07″E
- Opening date: 1974

Dam and spillways
- Height: 40 m (130 ft)
- Length: 195.8 m (642 ft)

Reservoir
- Total capacity: 877,000 m^{3} (31,000,000 cu ft)
- Catchment area: 2.3 km^{2} (0.89 sq mi)
- Surface area: 8 hectares (20 acres)

Ohsugi Dam (Japanese: 大杉ダム) is an earthfill dam located in Hyogo Prefecture in Japan. The dam is used for irrigation. The catchment area of the dam is 2.3 km^{2}. The dam impounds about 8 ha of land when full and can store 877 thousand cubic meters of water. The construction of the dam was completed in 1974.

== See also ==
- List of dams in Japan
