= Nariai Dam =

Dam in Hyogo Prefecture, Japan

- Location within Japan
- Official name: 成相ダム
- Location: Hyogo Prefecture, Japan
- Coordinates: 34°16′27″N 134°48′57″E
- Construction began: 1981
- Opening date: 1999

Dam and spillways
- Height: 61 m (200 ft)
- Length: 223.5 m (733 ft)

Reservoir
- Total capacity: 4050 thousand cubic meters
- Catchment area: 5.1 sq. km
- Surface area: 19 hectares

Nariai Dam (Japanese: 成相ダム) is a gravity dam located in Hyogo Prefecture in Japan. The dam is used for flood control and water supply. The catchment area of the dam is 5.1 km^{2}. The dam impounds about 19 ha of land when full and can store 4050 thousand cubic meters of water. The construction of the dam was started on 1981 and completed in 1999.

== See also ==
- List of dams in Japan
