= Takehara Dam =

Dam in Hyogo Prefecture, Japan

- Location within Japan
- Official name: 竹原ダム
- Location: Hyogo Prefecture, Japan
- Coordinates: 34°18′14″N 134°53′55″E
- Construction began: 1959
- Opening date: 1962

Dam and spillways
- Height: 34 m (112 ft)
- Length: 96 m (315 ft)

Reservoir
- Total capacity: 804,000 m^{3} (28,400,000 cu ft)
- Catchment area: 4.7 km^{2} (1.8 sq mi)
- Surface area: 10 hectares (25 acres)

Takehara Dam (Japanese: 竹原ダム) is a gravity dam located in Hyogo Prefecture in Japan. The dam is used for water supply. The catchment area of the dam is 4.7 km^{2}. The dam impounds about 10 ha of land when full and can store 804 thousand cubic meters of water. The construction of the dam was started on 1959 and completed in 1962.

== See also ==
- List of dams in Japan
