= Sengari Dam =

Dam in Hyōgo Prefecture, Japan

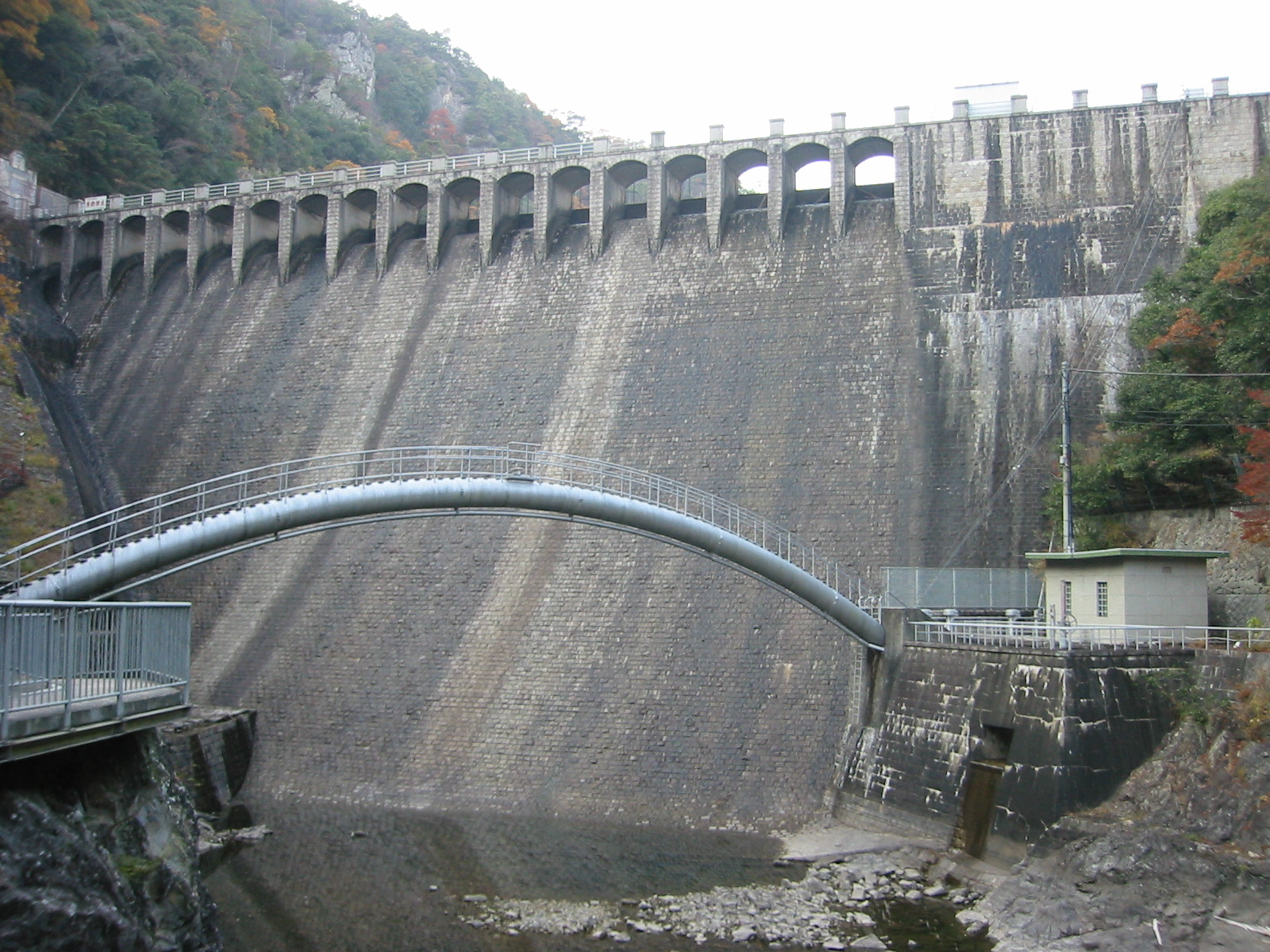
- Interactive map of Sengari Dam
- Location: Hyōgo Prefecture, Japan.
- Coordinates: 34.8761°N 135.27°E
- Construction began: 1914
- Opening date: 1919

Dam and spillways
- Height: 42.4 m
- Length: 106.7 m

Reservoir
- Total capacity: 11,717,000 m^{3}
- Catchment area: 94.5 km^{2}
- Surface area: 112 hectares

Sengari Dam is a dam in the Hyōgo Prefecture of Japan.

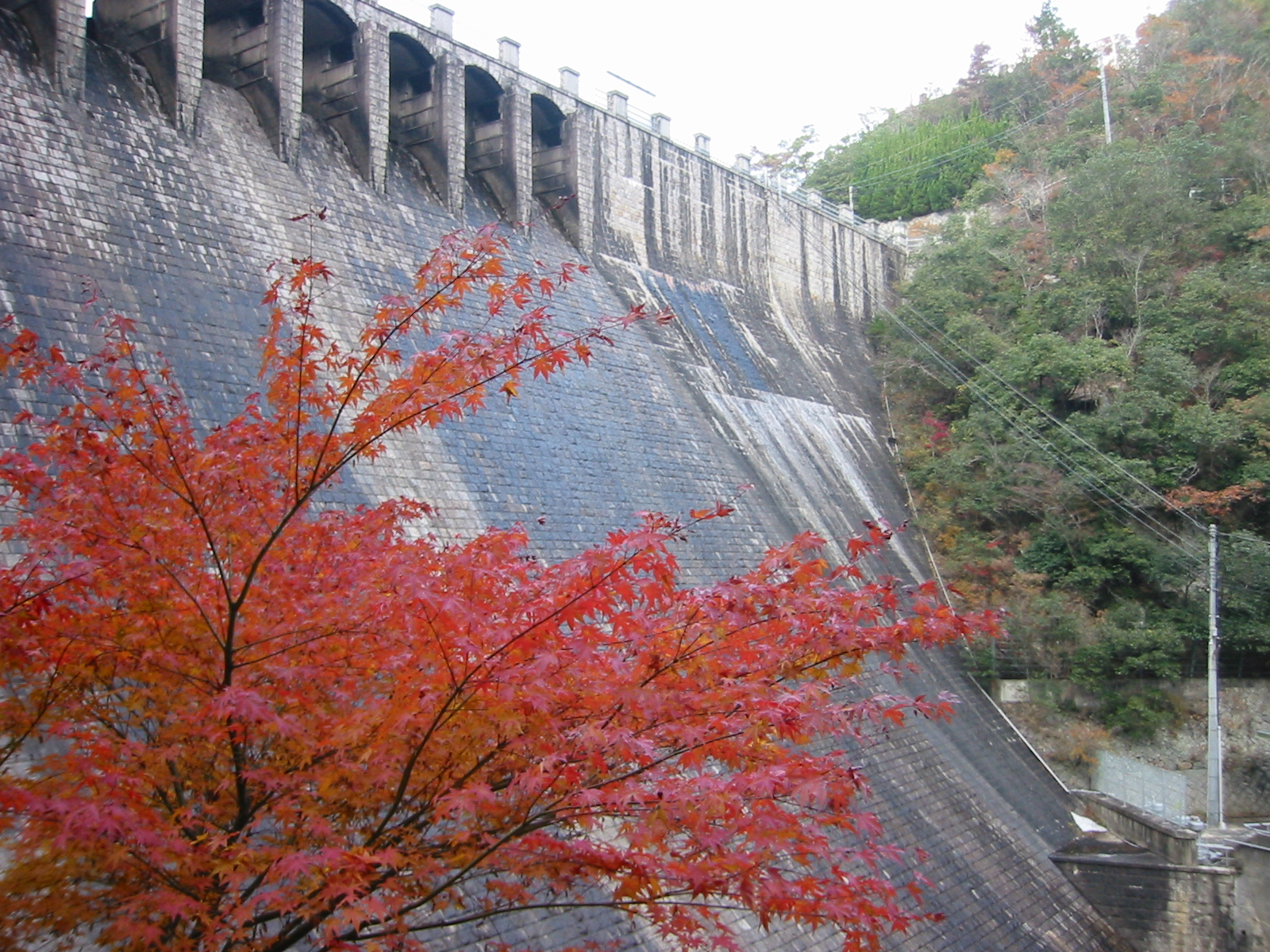

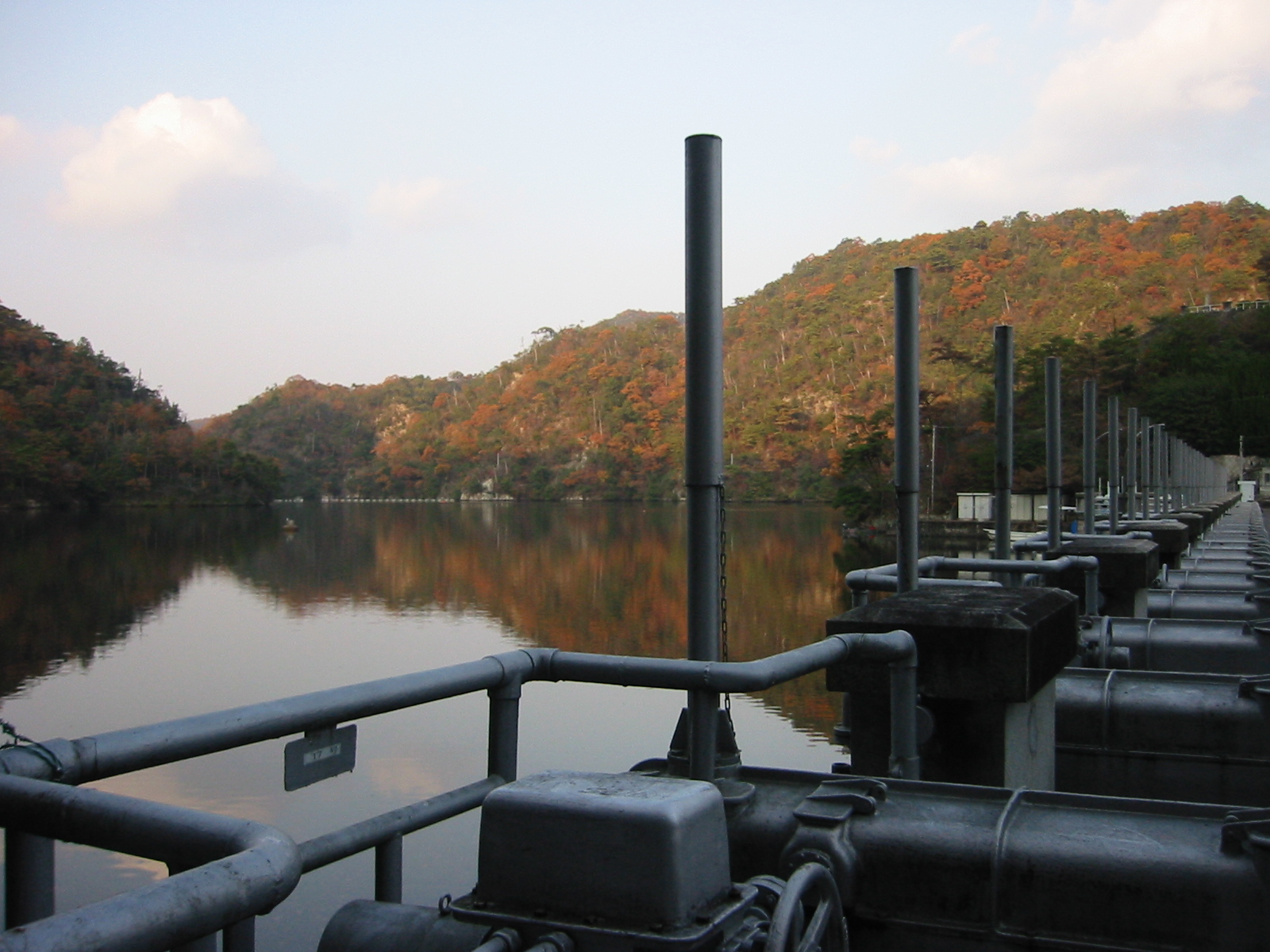

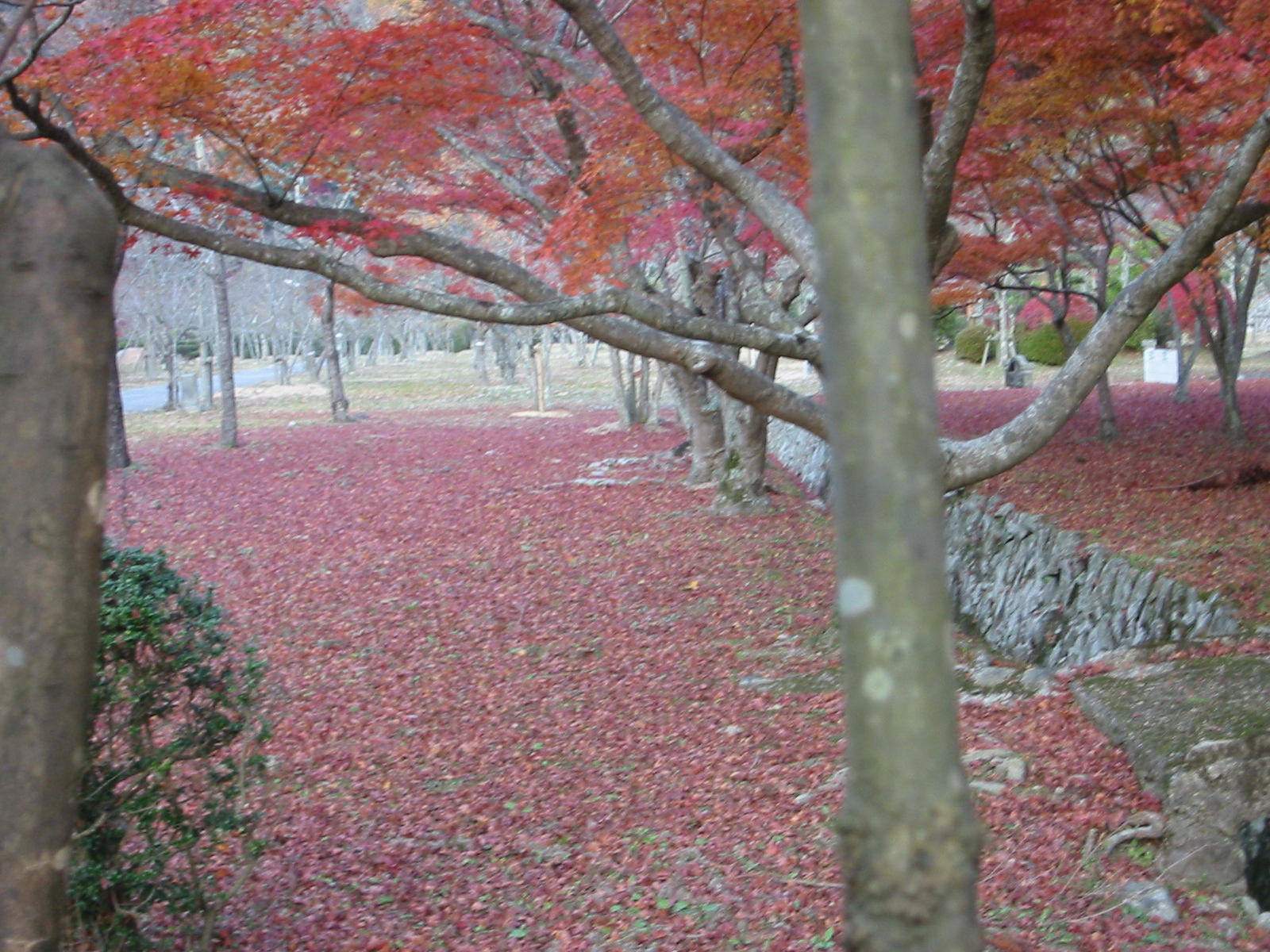
