= Showa-ike Dam (Hyōgo) =

Dam in Hyogo Prefecture, Japan

Showa-ike
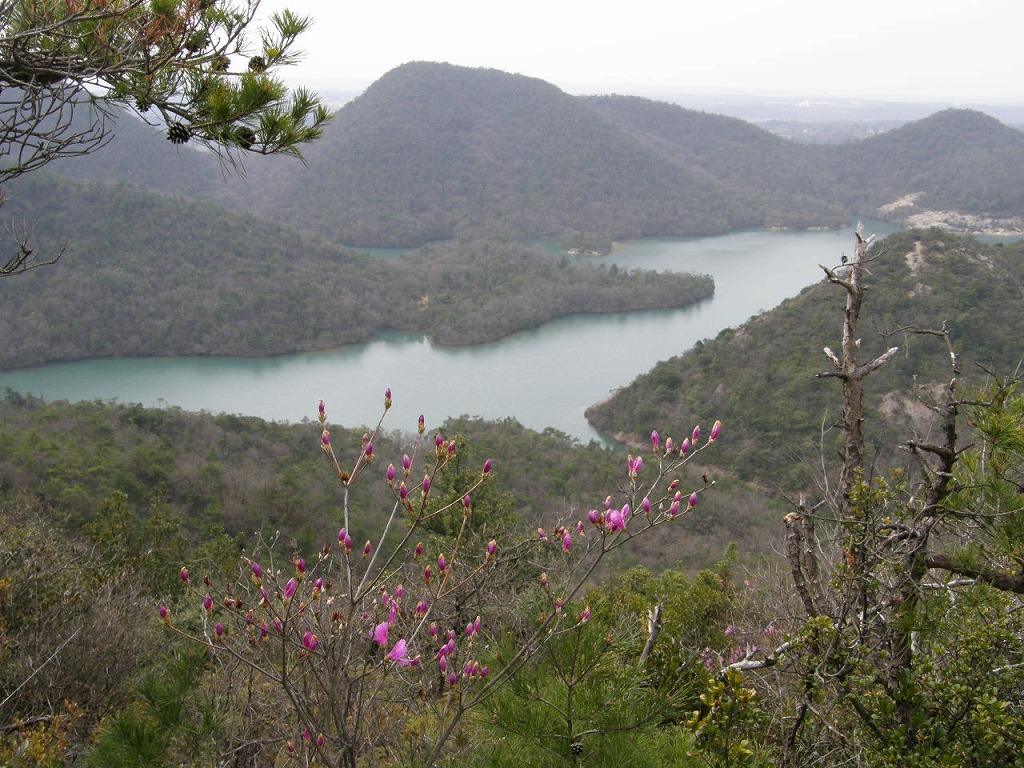

- Location within Japan
- Official name: 昭和池
- Location: Hyogo Prefecture, Japan
- Coordinates: 34°34′32″N 135°0′24″E
- Opening date: 1944

Dam and spillways
- Height: 23 m (75 ft)
- Length: 70 m (230 ft)

Reservoir
- Total capacity: 62,000 m^{3} (2,200,000 cu ft)
- Surface area: 1 hectare (2.5 acres)

Showa-ike (Japanese: 昭和池) is an earthfill dam located in Hyogo Prefecture in Japan. The dam is used for irrigation. The dam impounds about 1 ha of land when full and can store 62 thousand cubic meters of water. The construction of the dam was started on and completed in 1944.

== See also ==
- List of dams in Japan
