= Sanaka Dam =

Dam in Hyogo Prefecture, Japan

- Location within Japan
- Official name: 佐仲ダム
- Location: Hyogo Prefecture, Japan
- Coordinates: 35°7′06″N 135°9′43″E
- Construction began: 1967
- Opening date: 1978

Dam and spillways
- Height: 38.9 m (128 ft)
- Length: 144 m (472 ft)

Reservoir
- Total capacity: 505,000 m^{3} (17,800,000 cu ft)
- Catchment area: 2 km^{2} (0.77 sq mi)
- Surface area: 4 hectares (9.9 acres)

Sanaka Dam (Japanese: 佐仲ダム) is an earthfill dam located in Hyogo Prefecture in Japan. The dam is used for irrigation. The catchment area of the dam is 2 km^{2}. The dam impounds about 4 ha of land when full and can store 505 thousand cubic meters of water. The construction of the dam was started on 1967 and completed in 1978.

== See also ==
- List of dams in Japan
