= Inohana Dam =

Dam in Hyogo Prefecture, Japan

- Location within Japan
- Interactive map of Inohana Dam
- Official name: 猪ノ鼻ダム
- Location: Hyogo Prefecture, Japan
- Coordinates: 34°17′52″N 134°52′24″E
- Construction began: 1930
- Opening date: 1933

Dam and spillways
- Height: 27.9 m (92 ft)
- Length: 89.2 m (293 ft)

Reservoir
- Total capacity: 306 thousand cubic meters
- Catchment area: 3.2 sq. km
- Surface area: 4 hectares

Inohana Dam (Japanese: 猪ノ鼻ダム) is a gravity dam located in Hyogo Prefecture in Japan. The dam is used for water supply. The catchment area of the dam is 3.2 km^{2}. The dam impounds about 4 ha of land when full and can store 306 thousand cubic meters of water. The construction of the dam was started on 1930 and completed in 1933.

== See also ==
- List of dams in Japan
