= Yofudo Dam =

Dam in Hyogo Prefecture, Japan

- Location within Japan
- Official name: 与布土ダム
- Location: Hyogo Prefecture, Japan
- Coordinates: 35°16′30″N 134°53′20″E
- Construction began: 1991
- Opening date: 2016

Dam and spillways
- Height: 54.4 m (178 ft)
- Length: 145 m (476 ft)

Reservoir
- Total capacity: 1,080,000 m^{3} (38,000,000 cu ft)
- Catchment area: 5.1 km^{2} (2.0 sq mi)
- Surface area: 6 hectares (15 acres)

Yofudo Dam (Japanese: 与布土ダム) is a gravity dam located in Hyogo Prefecture in Japan. The dam is used for flood control and water supply. The catchment area of the dam is 5.1 km^{2}. The dam impounds about 6 ha of land when full and can store 1080 thousand cubic meters of water. The construction of the dam was started on 1991 and completed in 2016.

== See also ==
- List of dams in Japan
