= Kinen-ike Dam =

Dam in Hyogo Prefecture, Japan

Kinen-ike
- Location within Japan
- Official name: 記念池
- Location: Hyogo Prefecture, Japan
- Coordinates: 35°1′09″N 135°1′24″E
- Opening date: 1944

Dam and spillways
- Height: 15.5 m (51 ft)
- Length: 106 m (348 ft)

Reservoir
- Total capacity: 330 thousand cubic meters
- Catchment area: 1 sq. km
- Surface area: 5 hectares

Kinen-ike (Japanese: 記念池) is an earthfill dam located in Hyogo Prefecture in Japan. The dam is used for irrigation. The catchment area of the dam is 1 km^{2}. The dam impounds about 5 ha of land when full and can store 330 thousand cubic meters of water. The construction of the dam was completed in 1944.

== See also ==
- List of dams in Japan
