= Honjogawa Dam =

Dam in Hyogo Prefecture, Japan

- Location within Japan
- Interactive map of Honjogawa Dam
- Official name: 本庄川ダム
- Location: Hyogo Prefecture, Japan
- Coordinates: 34°13′15″N 134°46′02″E
- Construction began: 1985
- Opening date: 2004

Dam and spillways
- Height: 47.7 m (156 ft)
- Length: 184 m (604 ft)

Reservoir
- Total capacity: 1720 thousand cubic meters
- Catchment area: 3.4 sq. km
- Surface area: 12 hectares

Honjogawa Dam (Japanese: 本庄川ダム) is a gravity dam located in Hyogo Prefecture in Japan. The dam is used for flood control, irrigation and water supply. The catchment area of the dam is 3.4 km^{2}. The dam impounds about 12 ha of land when full and can store 1720 thousand cubic meters of water. The construction of the dam was started on 1985 and completed in 2004.

== See also ==
- List of dams in Japan
