= Ohkawase Dam =

Dam in Hyogo Prefecture, Japan

- Location within Japan
- Official name: 大川瀬ダム
- Location: Hyōgo Prefecture, Japan
- Coordinates: 34°56′47″N 135°7′01″E
- Construction began: 1968
- Opening date: 1991

Dam and spillways
- Height: 50.8 m (167 ft)
- Length: 164 m (538 ft)

Reservoir
- Total capacity: 9,300,000 m^{3} (330,000,000 cu ft)
- Catchment area: 279.6 km^{2} (108.0 sq mi)
- Surface area: 67 hectares (170 acres)

Ohkawase Dam (Japanese: 大川瀬ダム) is a gravity dam located in Hyōgo Prefecture in Japan. The dam is used for irrigation and water supply. The catchment area of the dam is 279.6 km^{2}. The dam impounds about 67 ha of land when full and can store 9300 thousand cubic meters of water. The construction of the dam was started on 1968 and completed in 1991.

== See also ==
- List of dams in Japan
