= Sakura-ike Dam =

Dam in Hyogo Prefecture, Japan

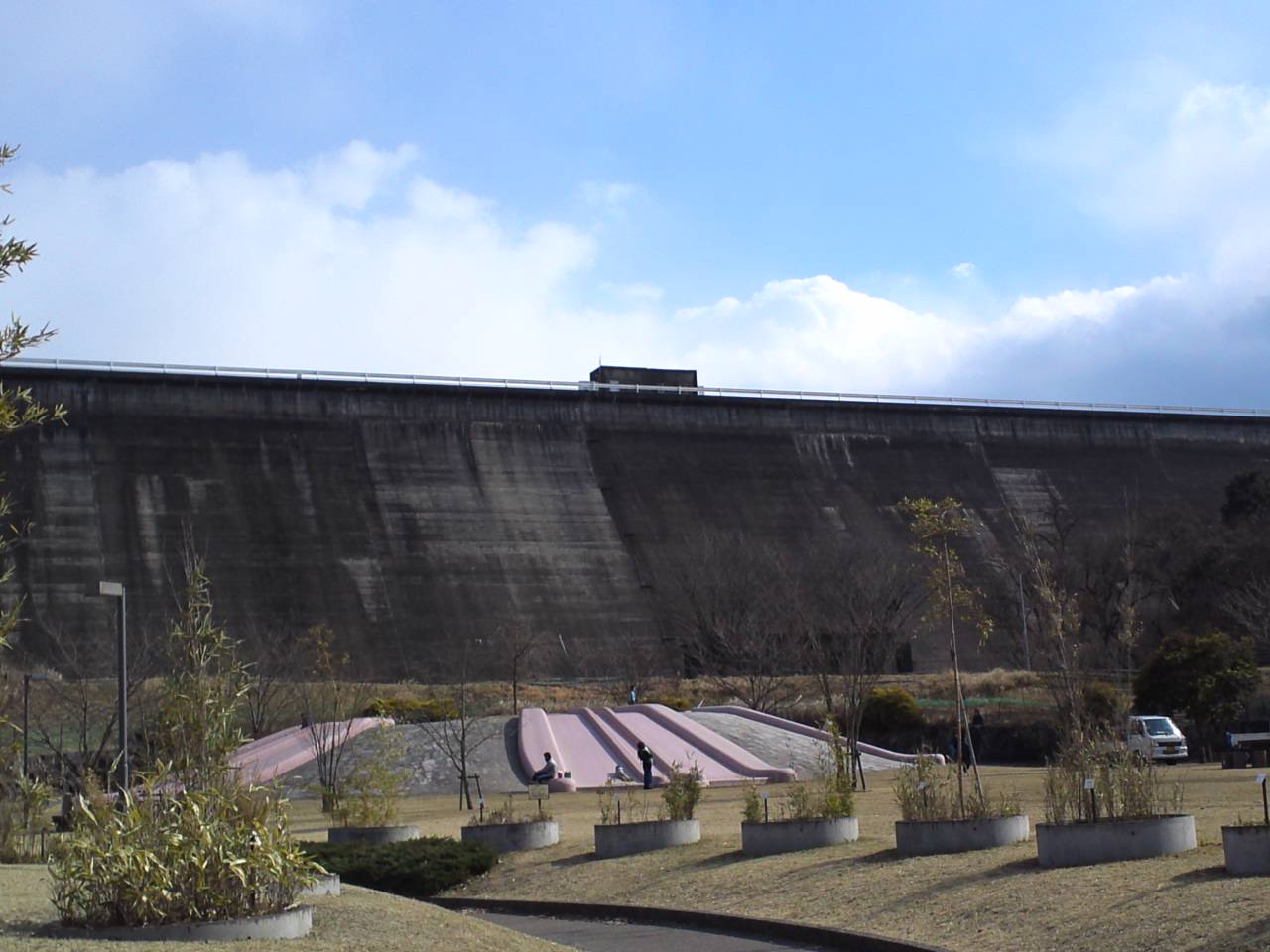

- Location within Japan
- Official name: 桜池
- Location: Hyogo Prefecture, Japan
- Coordinates: 34°48′04″N 135°12′20″E
- Opening date: 1951

Dam and spillways
- Height: 22.7 m (74 ft)
- Length: 101.5 m (333 ft)

Reservoir
- Total capacity: 335,000 m^{3} (11,800,000 cu ft)
- Catchment area: 0.9 km^{2} (0.35 sq mi)
- Surface area: 2 hectares (4.9 acres)

Sakura-ike Dam (Japanese: 桜池) is an earthfill dam located in Hyogo Prefecture in Japan. The dam is used for irrigation. The catchment area of the dam is 0.9 km^{2}. The dam impounds about 2 hectares of land when full and can store 335 thousand cubic meters of water. The construction of the dam was completed in 1951.

== See also ==
- List of dams in Japan
