= Daijo-ike Dam =

Dam in Hyogo Prefecture, Japan

Daijo-ike
- Location within Japan
- Interactive map of Daijo-ike
- Official name: 大城池
- Location: Hyogo Prefecture, Japan
- Coordinates: 34°17′19″N 134°51′01″E
- Opening date: 1928

Dam and spillways
- Height: 35.5 m (116 ft)
- Length: 170 m (560 ft)

Reservoir
- Total capacity: 946 thousand cubic meters
- Surface area: 7 hectares

Daijo-ike (Japanese: 大城池) is an earthfill dam located in Hyogo Prefecture in Japan. The dam is used for irrigation. The dam impounds about 7 ha of land when full and can store 946 thousand cubic meters of water. The construction of the dam was completed in 1928.

== See also ==
- List of dams in Japan
