= Ohtoguchi Dam =

Dam in Hyogo Prefecture, Japan

- Location within Japan
- Official name: 大戸口ダム
- Location: Hyogo Prefecture, Japan
- Coordinates: 34°41′51″N 135°2′04″E
- Construction began: 1988
- Opening date: 1989

Dam and spillways
- Height: 23.3 m (76 ft)
- Length: m

Reservoir
- Total capacity: 186,000 m^{3} (6,600,000 cu ft)
- Catchment area: 0.8 km^{2} (0.31 sq mi)

Ohtoguchi Dam (Japanese: 大戸口ダム) is an earthfill dam located in Hyogo Prefecture in Japan. The dam is used for flood control and irrigation. The catchment area of the dam is 0.8 km^{2}. The dam can store 186 thousand cubic meters of water. The construction of the dam was started on 1988 and completed in 1989.

== See also ==
- List of dams in Japan
