= List of dams in Tochigi Prefecture =

The following is a list of dams in Tochigi Prefecture, Japan.

== List ==
| Name | Location | Started | Opened | Height | Length | Image | DiJ number |
|---|---|---|---|---|---|---|---|
| Akagawa Dam | | 1965 | 1970 | 17.5 m (57 ft) | 221 m (725 ft) | | 0565 |
| Ashio Dam | | | | | | | |
| Chuzenji Dam | | 1953 | 1959 | 6.4 m (21 ft) | 25.1 m (82 ft) | | |
| Chiburi Dam | | 1966 | 1971 | 23 m (75 ft) | 130 m (430 ft) | | 0566 |
| Dorobu Dam | | 1962 | 1963 | 21.6 m (71 ft) | 56 m (184 ft) | | 0558 |
| Higashiarakawa Dam | | 1974 | 1990 | 70 m (230 ft) | 290 m (950 ft) | | 0577 |
| Hokigawa Dam | | | | | | | |
| Ikari Dam | | 1941 | 1956 | 112 m (367 ft) | 267 m (876 ft) | | 0559 |
| Imaichi Dam | | 1979 | 1986 | 75.5 m (248 ft) | | | 0579 |
| Itamuro Dam | | 1968 | 1973 | 16.8 m (55 ft) | 76 m (249 ft) | | 0569 |
| Kawaji Dam | | | | 140 m (460 ft) | | | 0571 |
| Kawamata Dam | | 1957 | 1966 | 117 m (384 ft) | 131 m (430 ft) | | 0563 |
| Koami Dam | | 1953 | 1958 | 23.5 m (77 ft) | 128 m (420 ft) | | 0560 |
| Koshin Dam | | 1975 | 1985 | 29 m (95 ft) | 55.9 m (183 ft) | | 0585 |
| Kurobe Dam | | | | 28.7 m (94 ft) | | | 0556 |
| Kuriyama Dam | | 1981 | 1985 | 97.5 m (320 ft) | | | 0578 |
| Kuriyasawa Dam | | | | 15 m (49 ft) | | | 3674 |
| Matsudagawa Dam | | 1981 | 1995 | 56 m (184 ft) | 228 m (748 ft) | | 0581 |
| Mikawasawa Dam | | 1984 | 2003 | 48.5 m (159 ft) | 97.5 m (320 ft) | | 0588 |
| Miyama Dam | | 1968 | 1973 | 75.5 m (248 ft) | 333.8 m (1,095 ft) | | 0568 |
| Nishigoya Dam | | 1962 | 1963 | 21.5 m (71 ft) | 189.7 m (622 ft) | | 0562 |
| Nakaiwa Dam | | 1922 | 1924 | 26.3 m (86 ft) | 107.9 m (354 ft) | | 0557 |
| Nakauchi Dam | | | | | | | |
| Nanma Dam | | 1969 | | 86.5 m (284 ft) | 359 m (1,178 ft) | | 0576 |
| Nishiarakawa Dam | | 1962 | 1968 | 43.5 m (143 ft) | 116 m (381 ft) | | 0564 |
| Nishigoya Dam | | 1962 | 1963 | 21.5 m (71 ft) | 189.7 m (622 ft) | | 0562 |
| Numappara Dam | | 1969 | 1973 | 38 m (125 ft) | 1,597 m (5,240 ft) | | 0567 |
| Ogoto Dam | | 1976 | 1986 | 27.7 m (91 ft) | 150 m (490 ft) | | 0572 |
| Omuro Dam | | | | | | | |
| Sabigawa Dam | | 1994 | 1994 | 104 m (341 ft) | | | 0583 |
| Shiobara Dam | | 1969 | 1978 | 60 m (200 ft) | 240 m (790 ft) | | 0570 |
| Sunokobashi Tailings Dam | | | | | | | |
| Sakasegawa Dam | | 1911 | 1912 | 18.2 m (60 ft) | 121.2 m (398 ft) | | 0555 |
| Shioda Dam | | 1977 | 2000 | 26.1 m (86 ft) | 218 m (715 ft) | | 0573 |
| Shiota Choseichi Dam | | 1982 | 2000 | 29 m (95 ft) | 460 m (1,510 ft) | | 3153 |
| Sugamata Choseichi Dam | | 1982 | 2002 | 28.4 m (93 ft) | 105 m (344 ft) | | 3279 |
| Terayama Dam | | 1972 | 1984 | 62.2 m (204 ft) | 260 m (850 ft) | | 0574 |
| Yanome Dam | | 1976 | 1990 | 29 m (95 ft) | 187 m (614 ft) | | 0575 |
| Yashio Dam | | 1986 | 1992 | 90.5 m (297 ft) | 263 m (863 ft) | | 0582 |
| Yunishigawa Dam | | 1982 | 2012 | 119 m (390 ft) | | | 0584 |

== See also ==
- Media related to Dams in Tochigi prefecture at Wikimedia Commons
