= Kuriyama Dam =

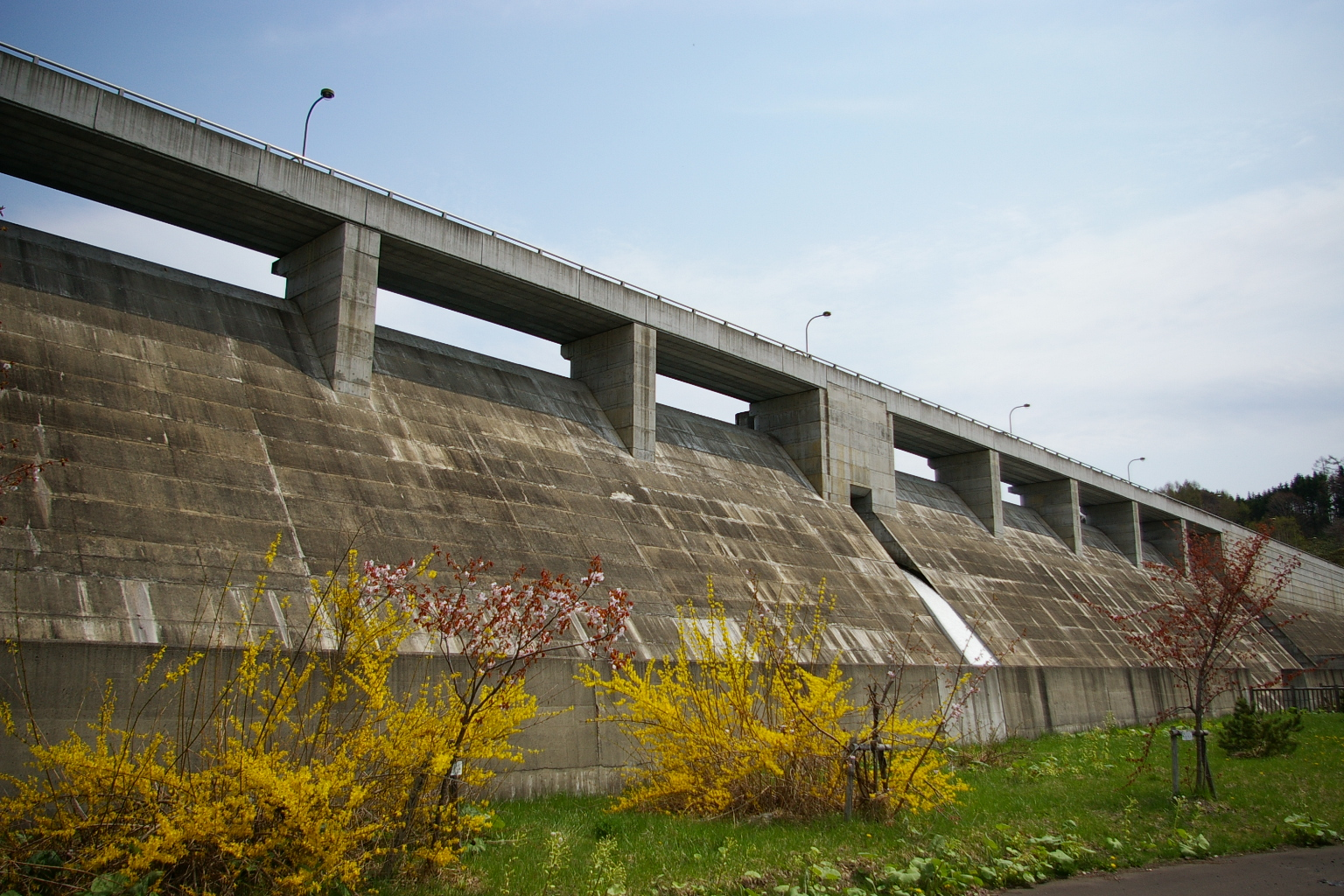
- Interactive map of Kuriyama Dam
- Location: Hokkaido, Japan
- Coordinates: 43°04′31″N 141°51′20″E

Dam and spillways
- Height: 31.9 metres (105 ft)
- Length: 540.0 metres (1,771.7 ft)

Reservoir
- Creates: Lake Kuriyama
- Total capacity: 174,000 cubic metres (6,100,000 ft^{3})
- Surface area: 15.2 square kilometres (5.9 mi^{2})

Kuriyama Dam (栗山ダム) is a concrete gravity dam in Hokkaido, Japan. The dam lies on the Ponuenbetsu River and forms Lake Kuriyama. The Ponuenbetsu River is a major tributary of the Ishikari River.

== History ==
The Kurayama Dam land use investigation started in 1972, as part of the Uenbetsu River Comprehensive Development Project. By 1975, the full-scale dam construction implementation planning began, and construction started in 1983. Land appropriation negotiations and road construction, excavation and the dam's main concrete wall ran from 1989 to 1992. The dam was completed in 1994. It is a rock-fill embankment dam on a tributary of the Togawa River located 6.4 km (4 mi) northwest of Nikkō in Tochigi Prefecture, Japan. It was constructed between 1981 and 1985. Its reservoir serves as the upper reservoir for the 1,050 MW Imaichi Pumped Storage Power Station, while the Imaichi Dam forms the lower. The dam is 97.5 m (320 ft) tall.
