= Imaichi (disambiguation) =

Imaichi may refer to:

== Places ==
- Imaichi, Tochigi, Kanto, Honshu, Japan; a city
- Imaichi Station, Nikkou, Tochigi, Kanto, Honshu, Japan; a train station
- Imaichi Dam, Togawa River, Tochigi, Kanto, Honshu, Japan; a gravity dam
- Imaichi Pumped Storage Power Station, Tochigi, Kanto, Honshu, Japan; a dual dam gravity battery

== Other uses ==
- Ryuji Imaichi (born 1986) Japanese singer

== See also ==
- The dictionary definition of 今市 at Wiktionary
- Taishibashi-Imaichi Station, Osaka Metro, Osaka, Japan; a rapid transit station
- Shimo-Imaichi Station, Nikkou, Tochigi, Kanto, Honshu, Japan; a train station
- Kami-Imaichi Station, Nikkou, Tochigi, Kanto, Honshu, Japan; a train station
