= Yashio Dam =

Yashio Dam may refer to:

- Yashio Dam (Akita), an earth fill dam located in Akita Prefecture, Japan
- Yashio Dam (Tochigi), an asphalt dam located in Tochigi Prefecture, Japan
