= Chuzenji Dam =

Dam in Tochigi Prefecture, Japan

Chuzenji Dam (Pre)
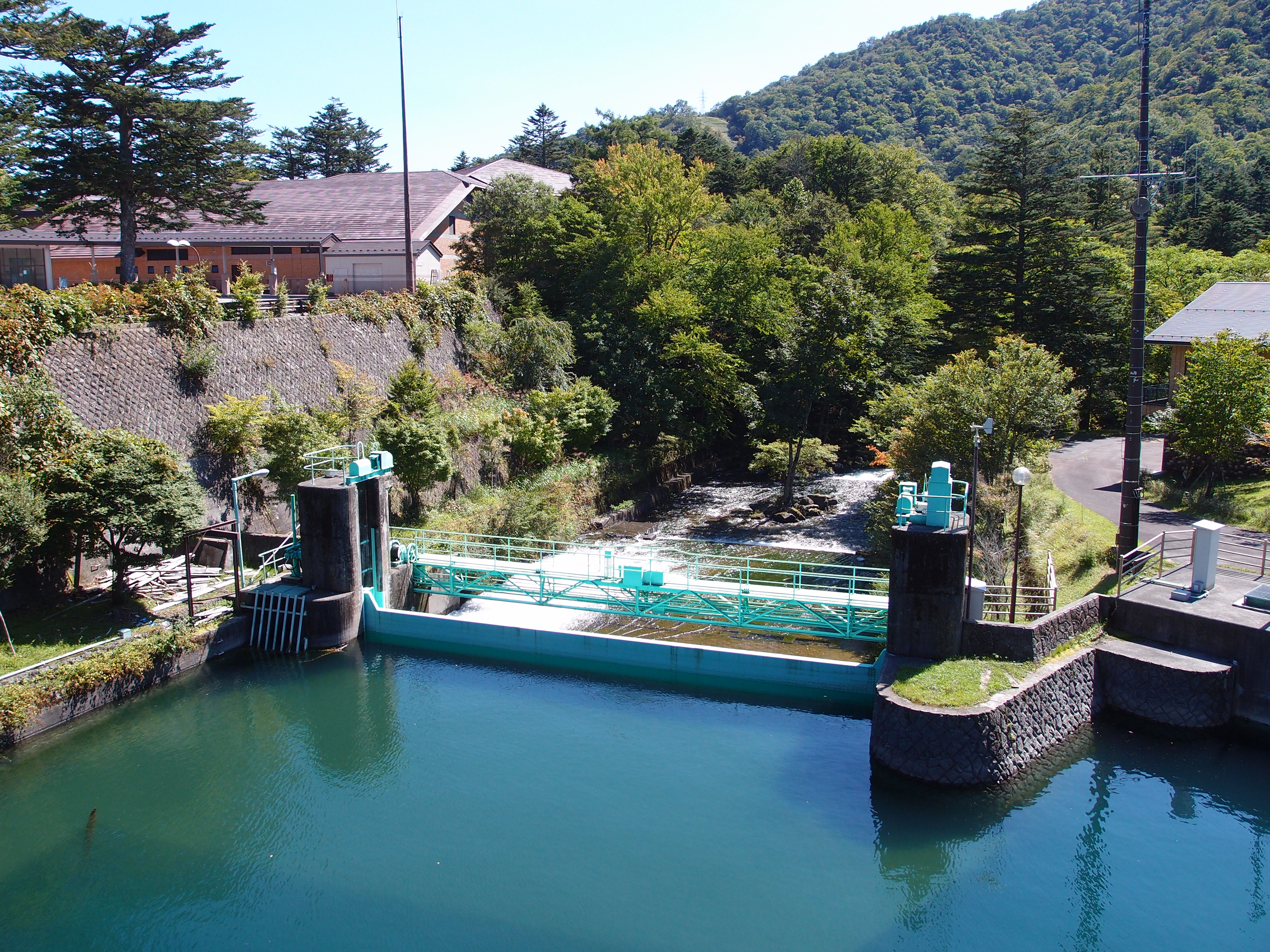

- Location within Japan
- Location: Tochigi Prefecture, Japan
- Coordinates: 36°44′19″N 139°29′57″E
- Construction began: 1953
- Opening date: 1959

Dam and spillways
- Height: 6.4 m (21 ft)
- Length: 25.1 m (82 ft)

Reservoir
- Total capacity: 25100 thousand cubic meters
- Catchment area: 125 sq. km
- Surface area: 1140 hectares

Chuzenji Dam (Pre) is a gravity dam located in Tochigi prefecture in Japan. The dam is used for flood control and power production. The catchment area of the dam is 125 km^{2}. The dam impounds about 1140 ha of land when full and can store 25100 thousand cubic meters of water. The construction of the dam was started on 1953 and completed in 1959.
