= Numappara Dam =

Dam in Tochigi Prefecture, Japan

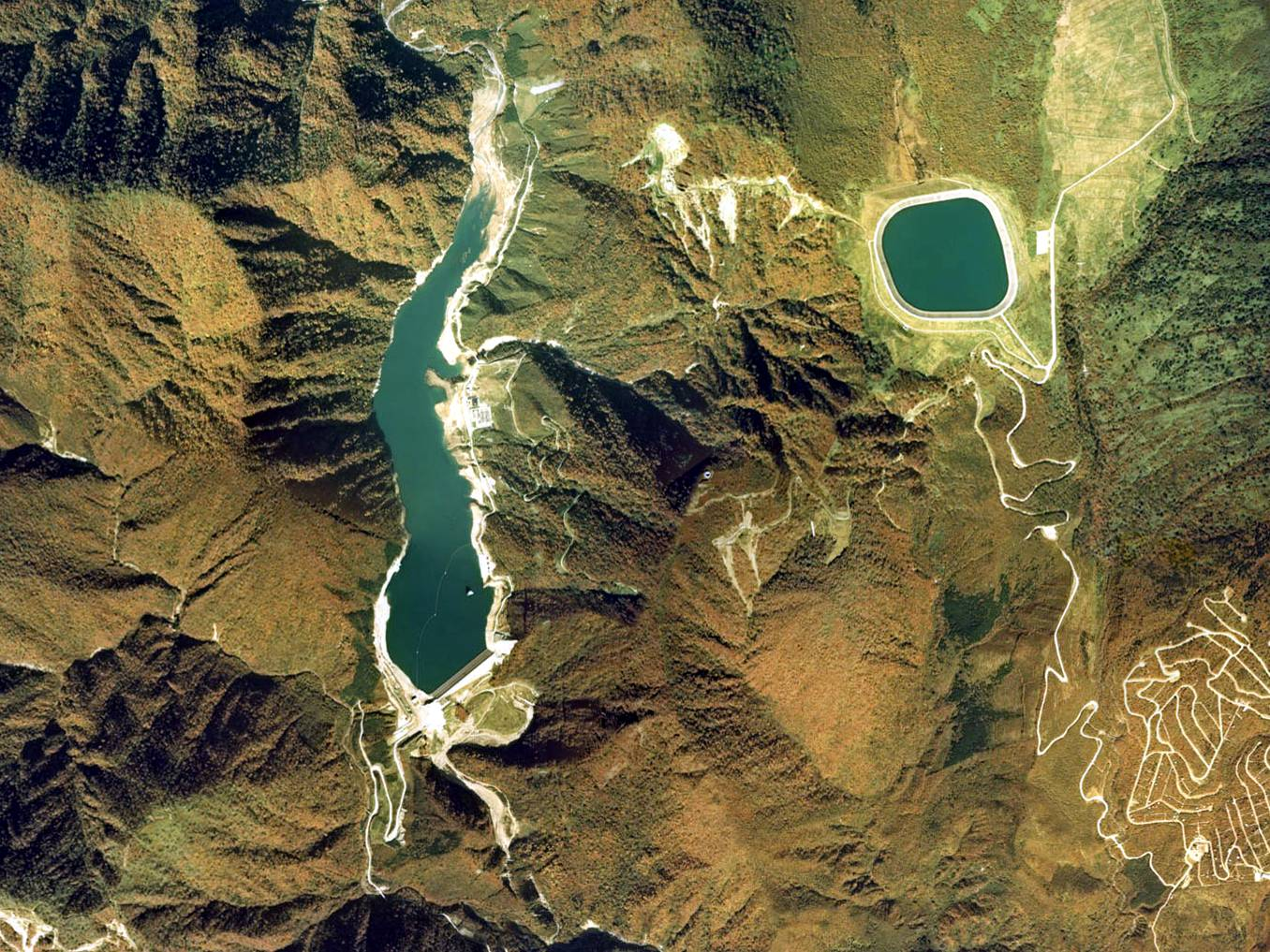

- Location within Japan
- Location: Tochigi Prefecture, Japan
- Coordinates: 37°6′14″N 139°55′42″E
- Construction began: 1969
- Opening date: 1973

Dam and spillways
- Height: 38 m (125 ft)
- Length: 1,597 m (5,240 ft)

Reservoir
- Total capacity: 4,336,000 m^{3} (153,100,000 cu ft)
- Catchment area: sq. km
- Surface area: 18 hectares (44 acres)

Numappara Dam is an asphalt dam located in Tochigi prefecture in Japan. The dam is used for power production. The catchment area of the dam is km^{2}. The dam impounds about 18 ha of land when full and can store 4336 thousand cubic meters of water. The construction of the dam was started on 1969 and completed in 1973.
