= Nanma Dam =

Dam in Tochigi Prefecture, Japan

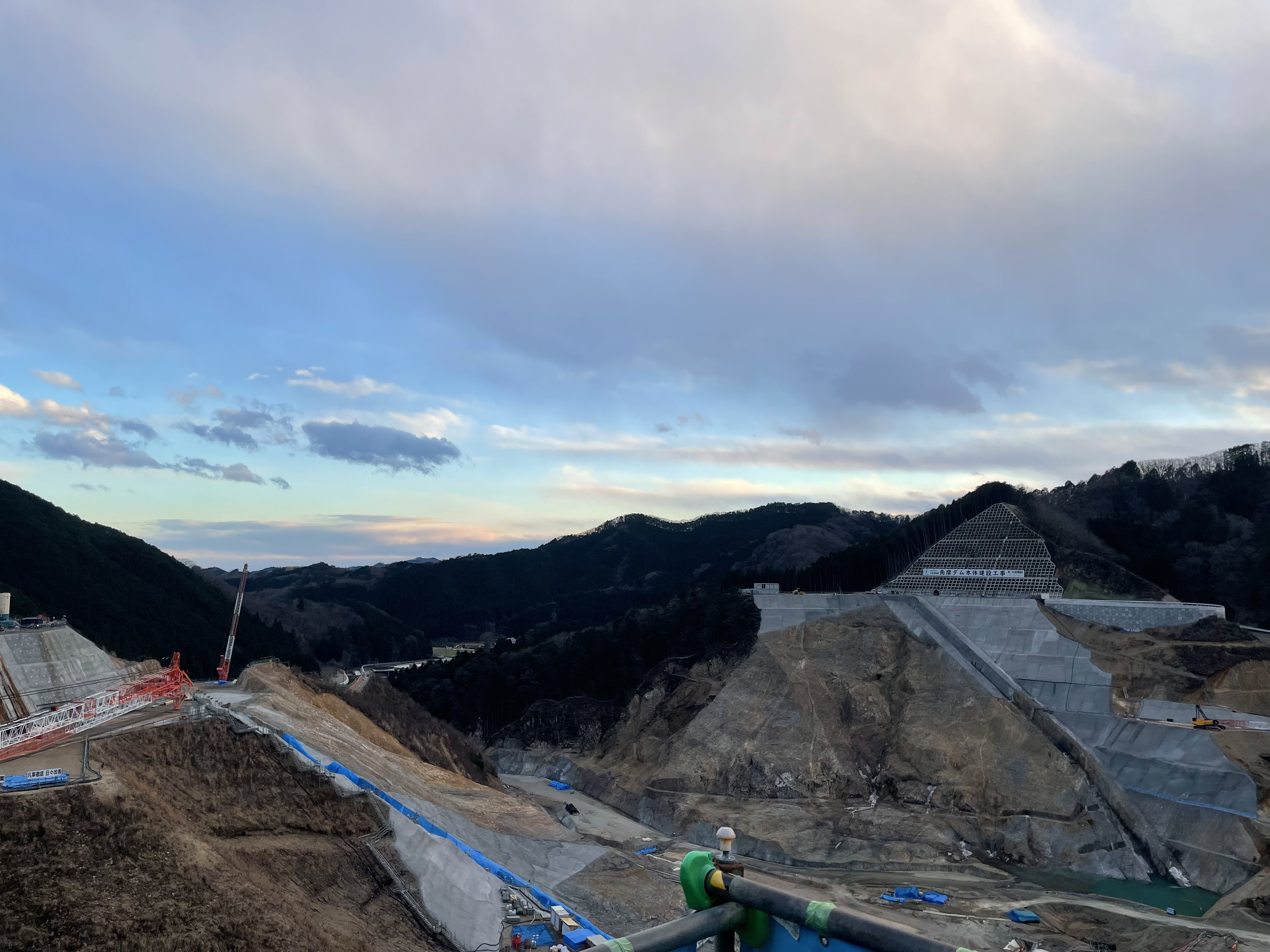

- Location within Japan
- Location: Tochigi Prefecture, Japan
- Coordinates: 36°33′01″N 139°40′10″E
- Construction began: 1969

Dam and spillways
- Height: 86.5 m (284 ft)
- Length: 359 m (1,178 ft)

Reservoir
- Total capacity: 51000 thousand cubic meters
- Catchment area: 139.3 sq. km
- Surface area: 210 hectares

Nanma Dam is a rockfill dam located in Tochigi prefecture in Japan. The dam is used for flood control and water supply. The catchment area of the dam is 139.3 km^{2}. The dam impounds about 210 ha of land when full and can store 51000 thousand cubic meters of water. The construction of the dam was started on 1969.
