= Sugamata Choseichi Dam =

Dam in Tochigi Prefecture, Japan

Sugamata Choseichi
- Location within Japan
- Location: Tochigi Prefecture, Japan
- Coordinates: 36°33′01″N 140°9′05″E
- Construction began: 1982
- Opening date: 2002

Dam and spillways
- Height: 28.4 m (93 ft)
- Length: 105 m (344 ft)

Reservoir
- Total capacity: 490,000 m^{3} (17,000,000 cu ft)
- Catchment area: 0.2 km^{2} (0.077 sq mi)
- Surface area: 6 hectares (15 acres)

Sugamata Choseichi is a gravity dam located in Tochigi prefecture in Japan. The dam is used for irrigation. The catchment area of the dam is 0.2 km^{2}. The dam impounds about 6 ha of land when full and can store 490 thousand cubic meters of water. The construction of the dam was started on 1982 and completed in 2002.
