= Koami Dam =

Dam in Tochigi Prefecture, Japan

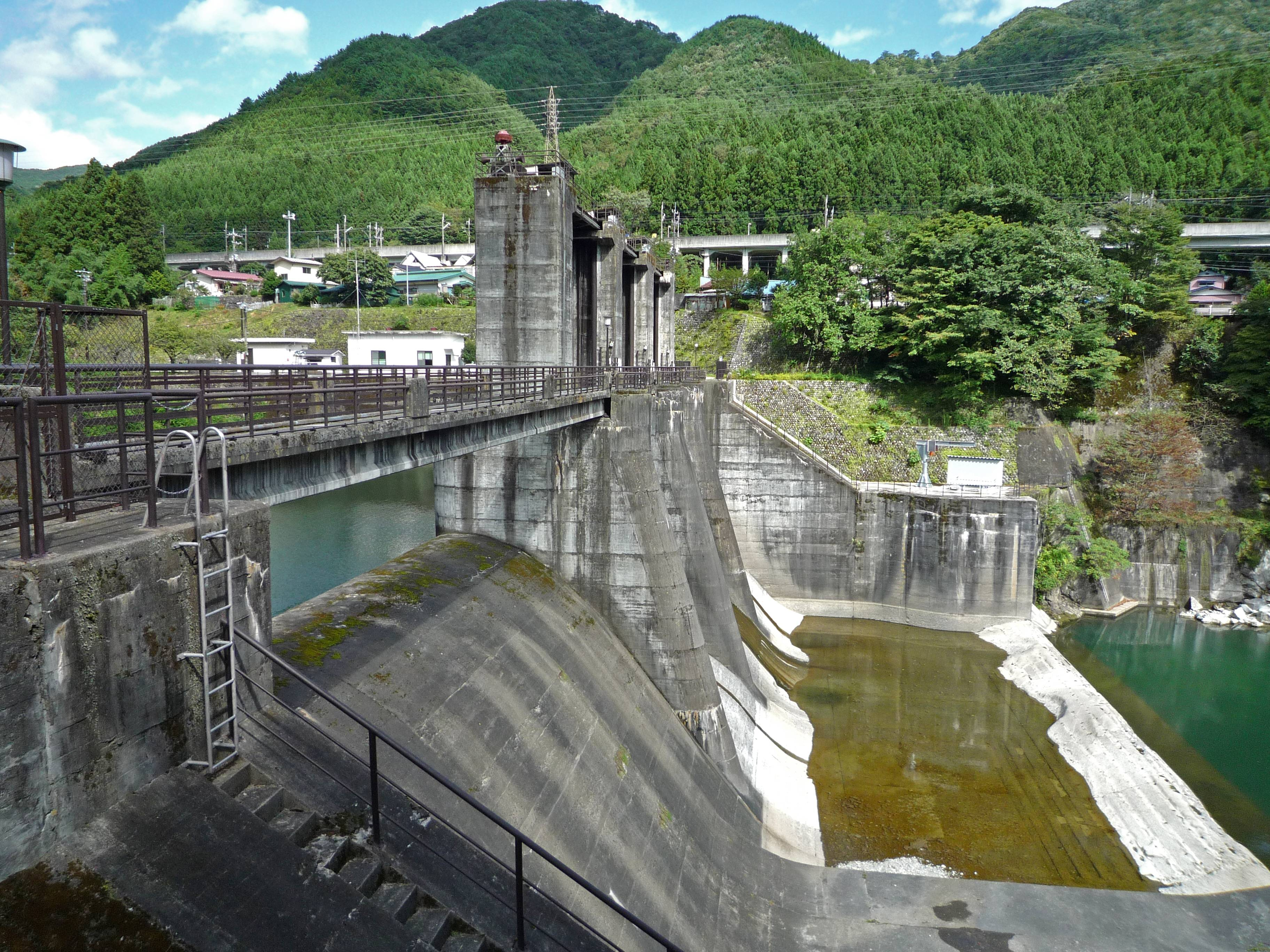

- Location within Japan
- Location: Tochigi Prefecture, Japan
- Coordinates: 36°53′02″N 139°42′09″E
- Construction began: 1953
- Opening date: 1958

Dam and spillways
- Height: 23.5 m (77 ft)
- Length: 128 m (420 ft)

Reservoir
- Total capacity: 627 thousand cubic meters
- Catchment area: 606.5 sq. km
- Surface area: 10 hectares

Koami Dam is a gravity dam located in Tochigi prefecture in Japan. The dam is used for power production. The catchment area of the dam is 606.5 km^{2}. The dam impounds about 10 ha of land when full and can store 627 thousand cubic meters of water. The construction of the dam was started on 1953 and completed in 1958.
