= Higashiarakawa Dam =

Dam in Tochigi Prefecture, Japan

Higashi Arakawa Dam
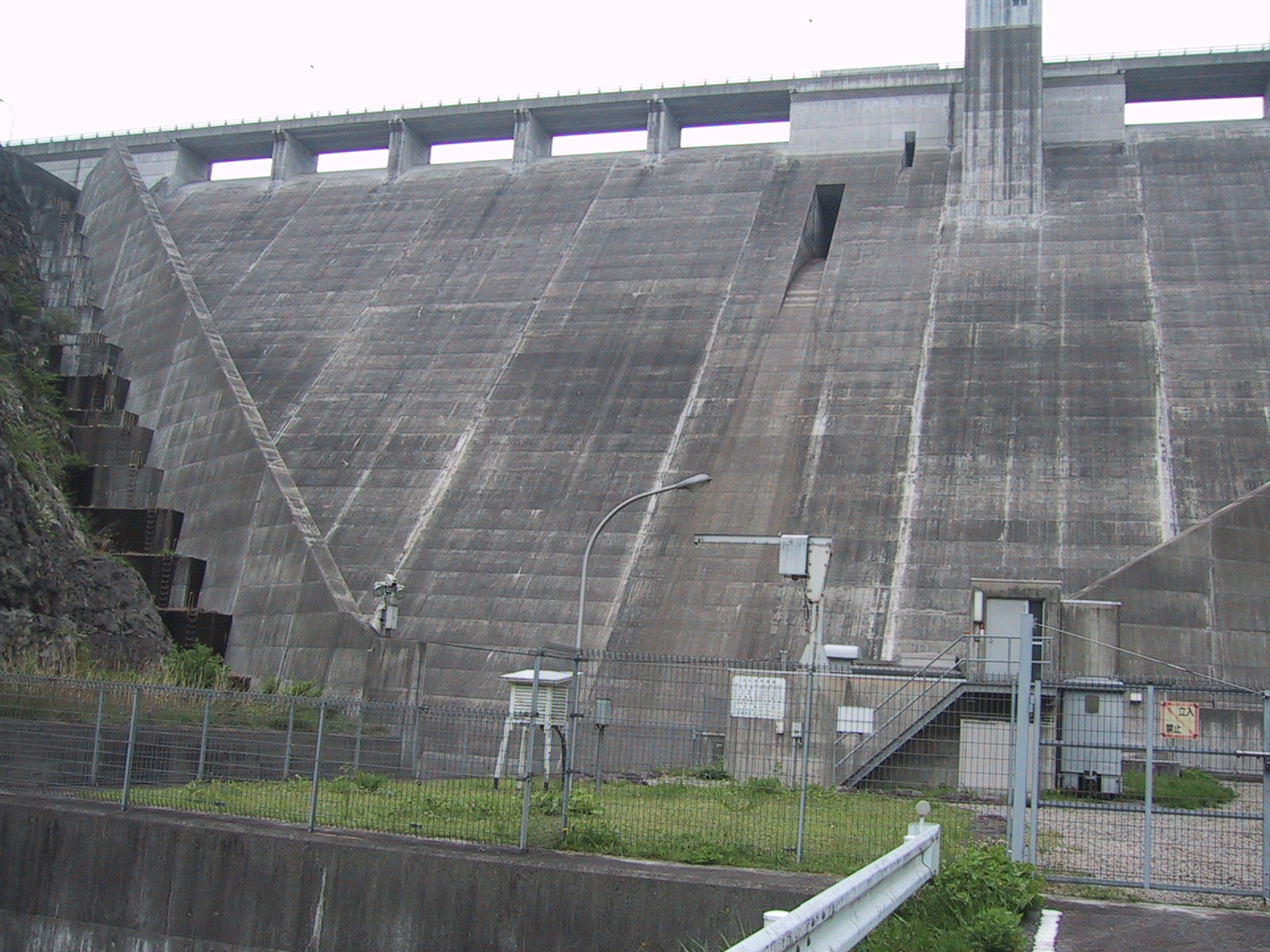

- Location within Japan
- Interactive map of Higashi Arakawa Dam
- Location: Tochigi Prefecture, Japan
- Coordinates: 36°50′50″N 139°49′44″E
- Construction began: 1974
- Opening date: 1990

Dam and spillways
- Height: 70 m (230 ft)
- Length: 290 m (950 ft)

Reservoir
- Total capacity: 6100 thousand cubic meters
- Catchment area: 21 sq. km
- Surface area: 37 hectares

Higashi Arakawa Dam is a gravity dam located in Tochigi prefecture in Japan. The dam is used for flood control, irrigation, water supply and power production. The catchment area of the dam is 21 km^{2}. The dam impounds about 37 ha of land when full and can store 6,100 thousand cubic meters of water. The construction of the dam was started in 1974 and completed in 1990.
