= Nishigoya Dam =

Dam in Tochigi Prefecture, Japan

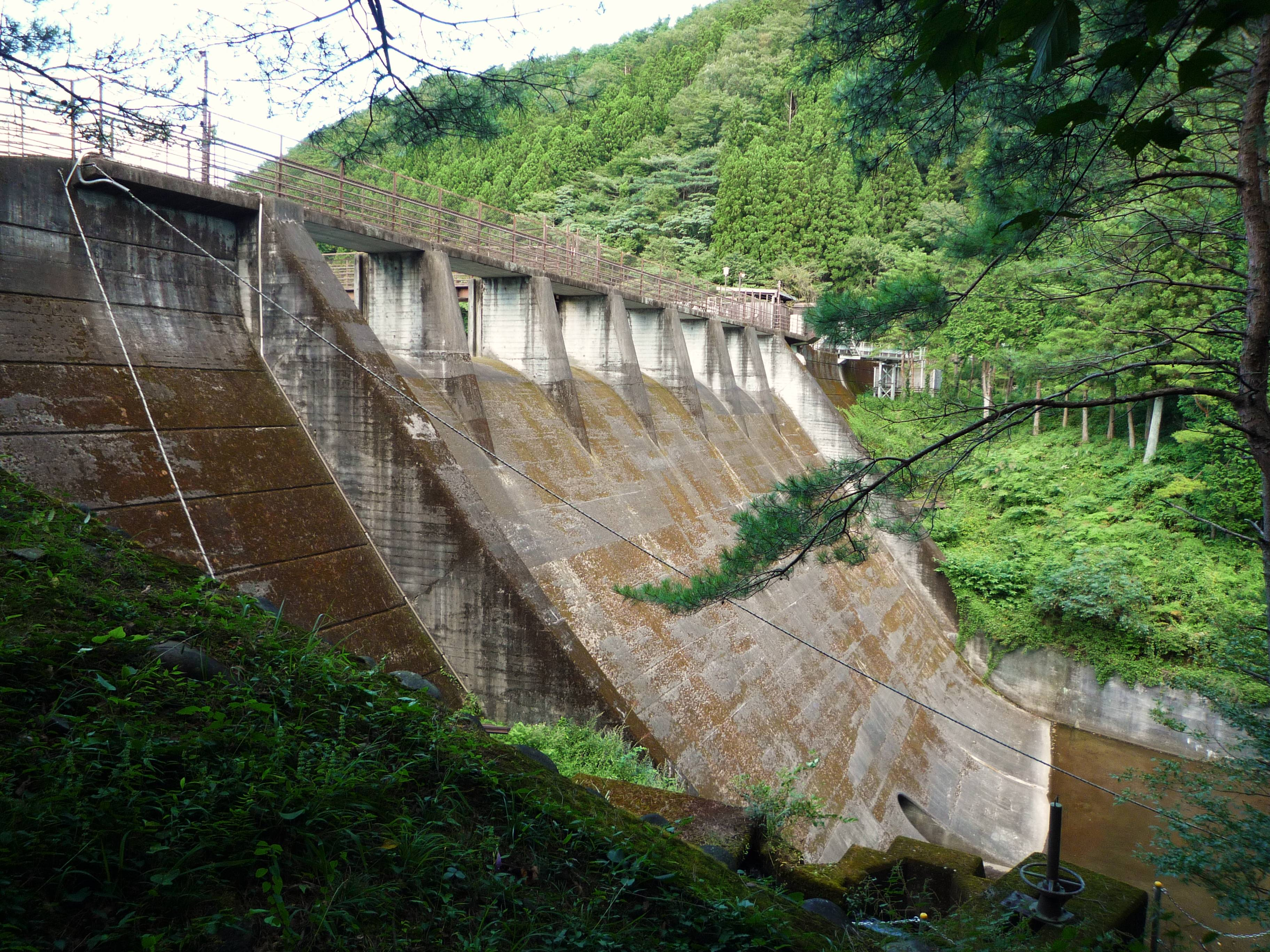

- Location within Japan
- Location: Tochigi Prefecture, Japan
- Coordinates: 36°47′41″N 139°45′13″E
- Construction began: 1962
- Opening date: 1963

Dam and spillways
- Height: 21.5 m (71 ft)
- Length: 189.7 m (622 ft)

Reservoir
- Total capacity: 547,000 m^{3} (19,300,000 cu ft)
- Catchment area: 286.3 km^{2} (110.5 sq mi)
- Surface area: 8 hectares (20 acres)

Nishigoya Dam is a gravity dam located in Tochigi prefecture in Japan. The dam is used for power production. The catchment area of the dam is 286.3 km^{2}. The dam impounds about 8 ha of land when full and can store 547 thousand cubic meters of water. The construction of the dam was started on 1962 and completed in 1963.
