= Miyama Dam =

Dam in Tochigi Prefecture, Japan

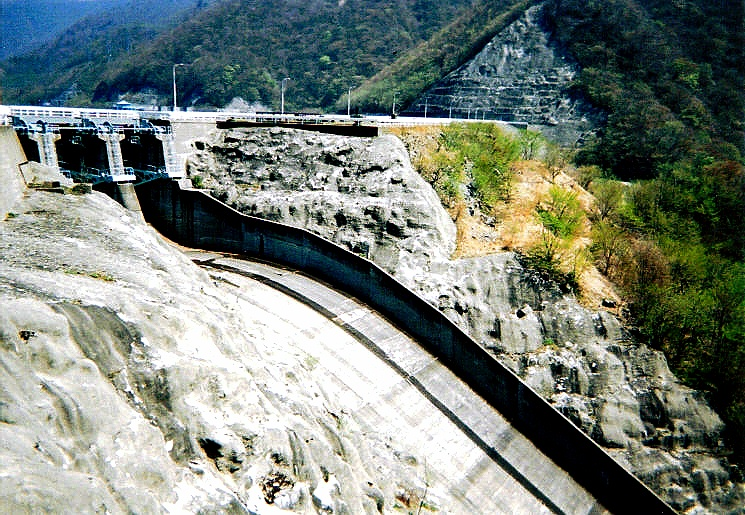

- Location within Japan
- Location: Tochigi Prefecture, Japan
- Coordinates: 37°5′21″N 139°54′16″E
- Construction began: 1968
- Opening date: 1973

Dam and spillways
- Height: 75.5 m (248 ft)
- Length: 333.8 m (1,095 ft)

Reservoir
- Total capacity: 25800 thousand cubic meters
- Catchment area: 65.9 sq. km
- Surface area: 97 hectares

Miyama Dam is an asphalt dam located in Tochigi prefecture in Japan. The dam is used for irrigation, water supply and power production. The catchment area of the dam is 65.9 km^{2}. The dam impounds about 97 ha of land when full and can store 25800 thousand cubic meters of water. The construction of the dam was started on 1968 and completed in 1973.
