= Ikari Dam =

Dam in Tochigi Prefecture, Japan

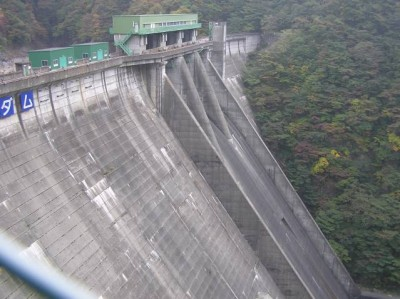

- Location within Japan
- Interactive map of Ikari Dam
- Location: Tochigi Prefecture, Japan
- Coordinates: 36°54′11″N 139°42′20″E
- Construction began: 1941
- Opening date: 1956

Dam and spillways
- Impounds: Ojika River
- Height: 112 m (367 ft)
- Length: 267 m (876 ft)

Reservoir
- Creates: Ikari Lake
- Total capacity: 55000 thousand cubic meters
- Catchment area: 271.2 sq. km
- Surface area: 310 hectares

Ikari Dam is a gravity dam located in Tochigi prefecture in Japan. The dam is used for flood control and power production. The catchment area of the dam is 271.2 km^{2}. The dam impounds about 310 ha of land when full and can store 55000 thousand cubic meters of water. The construction of the dam was started on 1941 and completed in 1956.
