= Itamuro Dam =

Dam in Tochigi Prefecture, Japan

- Location within Japan
- Interactive map of Itamuro Dam
- Location: Tochigi Prefecture, Japan
- Coordinates: 37°3′25″N 139°55′51″E
- Construction began: 1968
- Opening date: 1973

Dam and spillways
- Height: 16.8 m (55 ft)
- Length: 76 m (249 ft)

Reservoir
- Total capacity: 260 thousand cubic meters
- Catchment area: 151 sq. km
- Surface area: 5 hectares

Itamuro Dam is a gravity dam located in Tochigi prefecture in Japan. The dam is used for power production. The catchment area of the dam is 151 km^{2}. The dam impounds about 5 ha of land when full and can store 260 thousand cubic meters of water. The construction of the dam was started on 1968 and completed in 1973.
