= Nishiarakawa Dam =

Dam in Tochigi Prefecture, Japan

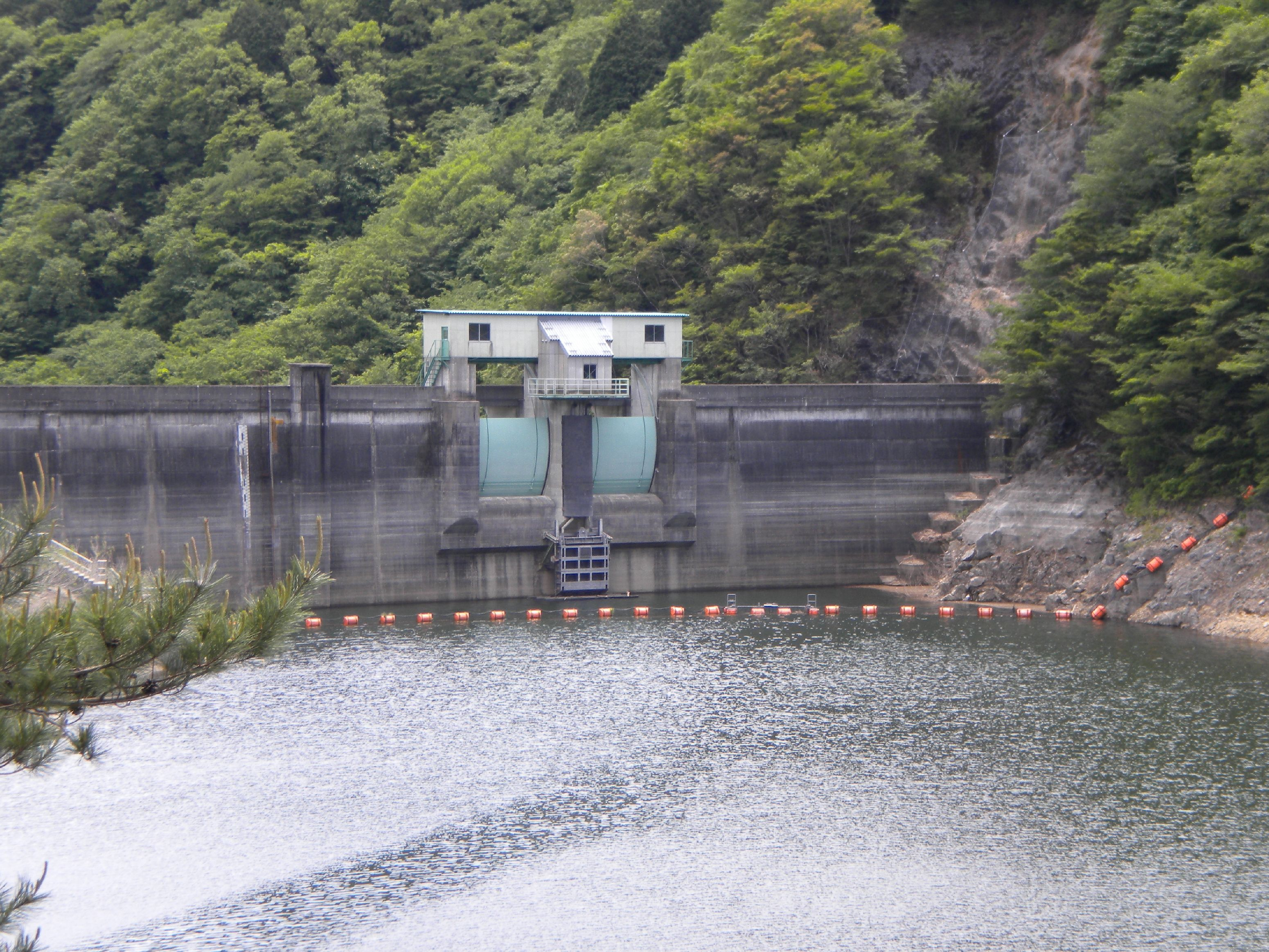

- Location within Japan
- Location: Tochigi Prefecture, Japan
- Coordinates: 36°49′00″N 139°48′29″E
- Construction began: 1962
- Opening date: 1968

Dam and spillways
- Height: 43.5 m (143 ft)
- Length: 116 m (381 ft)

Reservoir
- Total capacity: 4300 thousand cubic meters
- Catchment area: 24.8 sq. km
- Surface area: 28 hectares

Nishiarakawa Dam is a gravity dam located in Tochigi prefecture in Japan. The dam is used for flood control. The catchment area of the dam is 24.8 km^{2}. The dam impounds about 28 ha of land when full and can store 4300 thousand cubic meters of water. The construction of the dam was started on 1962 and completed in 1968.
