= Matsudagawa Dam =

Dam in Tochigi Prefecture, Japan

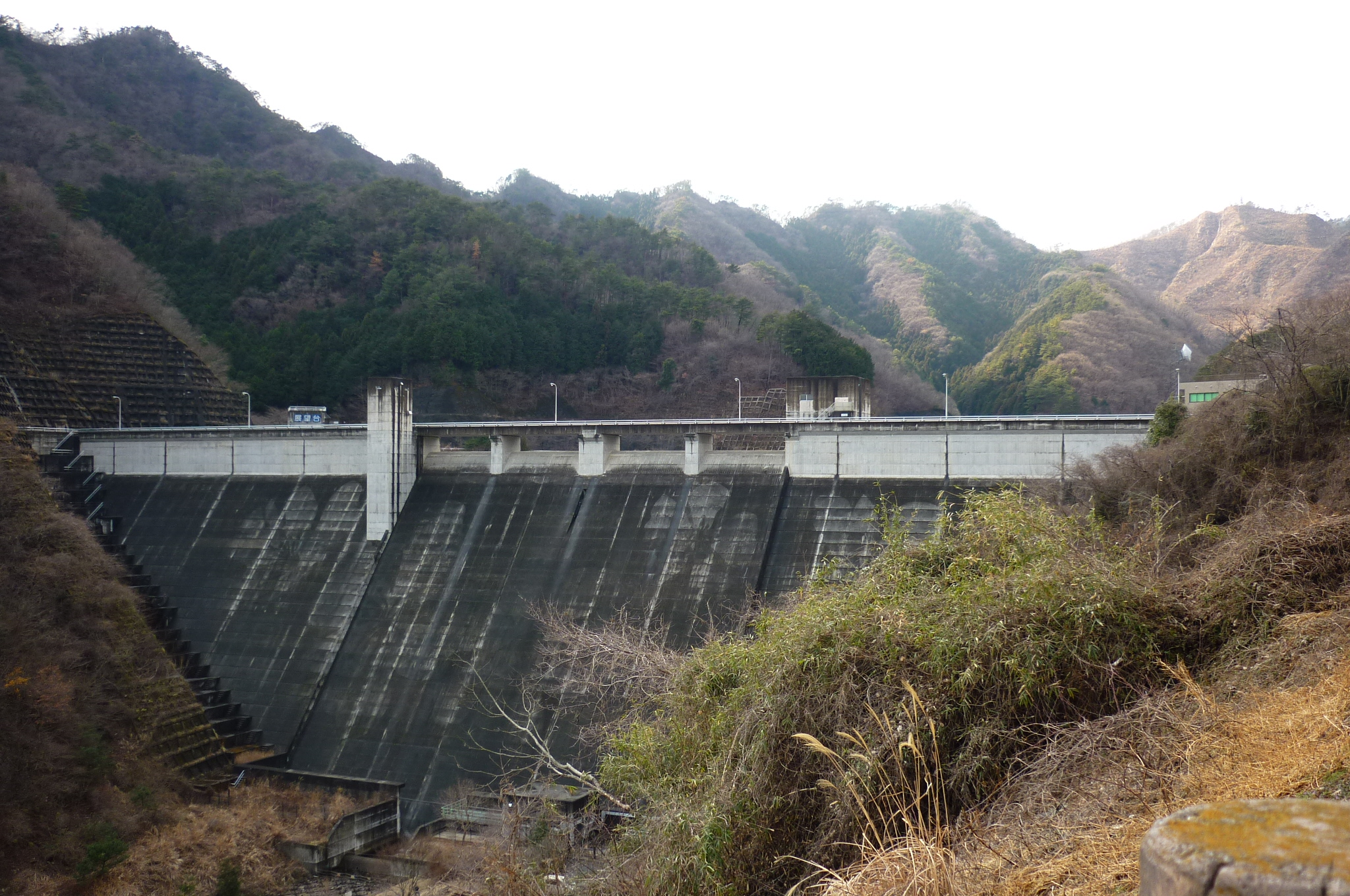

- Location within Japan
- Location: Tochigi Prefecture, Japan
- Coordinates: 36°25′35″N 139°25′30″E
- Construction began: 1981
- Opening date: 1995

Dam and spillways
- Height: 56 m (184 ft)
- Length: 228 m (748 ft)

Reservoir
- Total capacity: 1900 thousand cubic meters
- Catchment area: 4 sq. km
- Surface area: 11 hectares

Matsudagawa Dam is a gravity dam located in Tochigi prefecture in Japan. The dam is used for flood control and water supply. The catchment area of the dam is 4 km^{2}. The dam impounds about 11 ha of land when full and can store 1900 thousand cubic meters of water. The construction of the dam was started on 1981 and completed in 1995.
