= Kawamata Dam =

Dam in Tochigi Prefecture, Japan

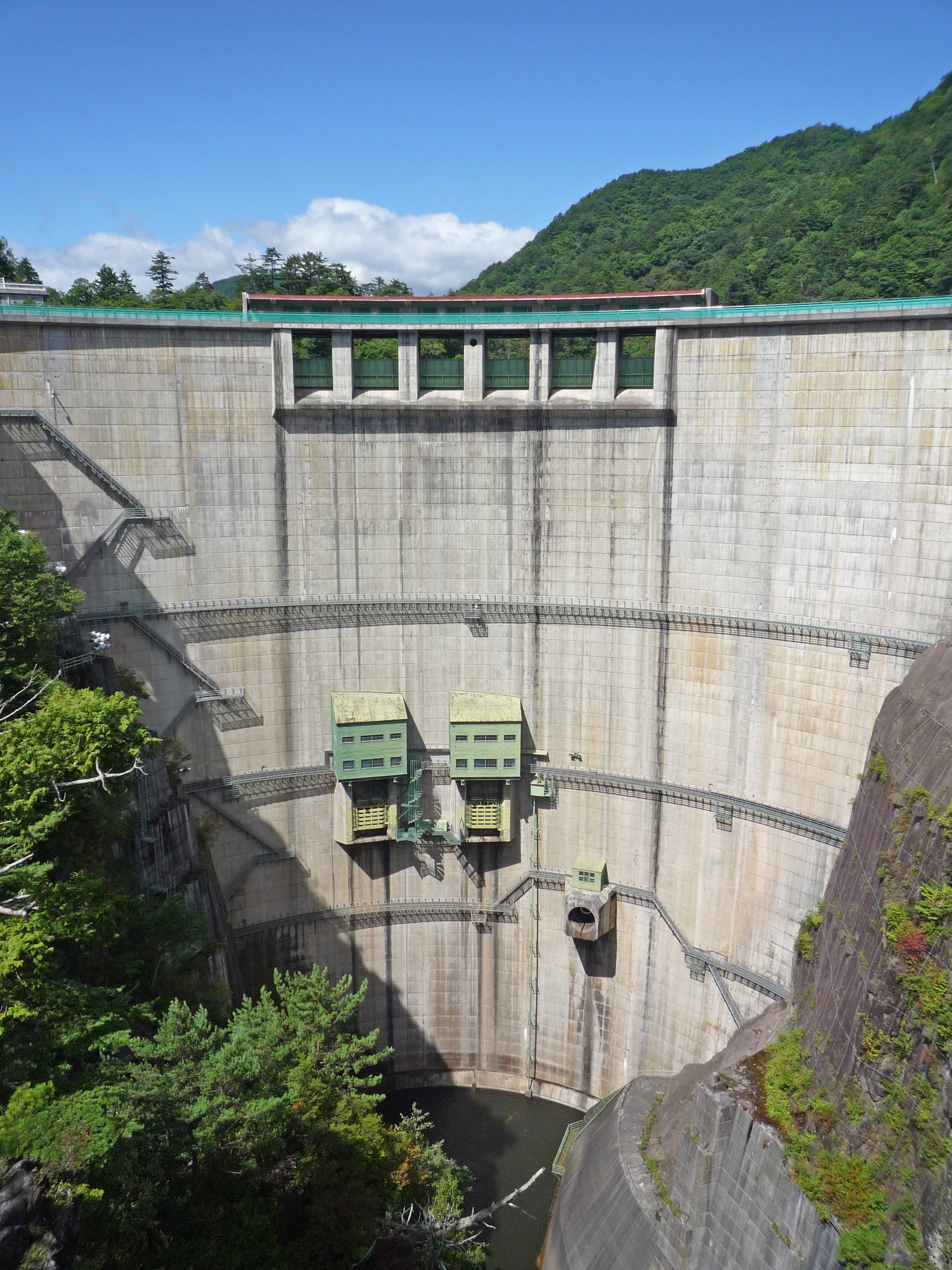

- Location within Japan
- Location: Tochigi Prefecture, Japan
- Coordinates: 36°52′41″N 139°31′13″E
- Construction began: 1957
- Opening date: 1966

Dam and spillways
- Impounds: Kinugawa River
- Height: 117 m (384 ft)
- Length: 131 m (430 ft)

Reservoir
- Creates: Kawamata Lake
- Total capacity: 87600 thousand cubic meters
- Catchment area: 179.4 sq. km
- Surface area: 259 hectares

Kawamata Dam is an arch dam located in Tochigi prefecture in Japan. The dam is used for flood control and power production. The catchment area of the dam is 179.4 km^{2}. The dam impounds about 259 ha of land when full and can store 87600 thousand cubic meters of water. The construction of the dam was started on 1957 and completed in 1966.
