= Mikawasawa Dam =

Dam in Tochigi Prefecture, Japan

- Location within Japan
- Location: Tochigi Prefecture, Japan
- Coordinates: 36°57′00″N 139°33′12″E
- Construction began: 1984
- Opening date: 2003

Dam and spillways
- Height: 48.5 m (159 ft)
- Length: 97.5 m (320 ft)

Reservoir
- Total capacity: 899 thousand cubic meters
- Catchment area: 13.9 sq. km
- Surface area: 7 hectares

Mikawasawa Dam is a gravity dam located in Tochigi prefecture in Japan. The dam is used for flood control and water supply. The catchment area of the dam is 13.9 km^{2}. The dam impounds about 7 ha of land when full and can store 899 thousand cubic meters of water. The construction of the dam was started on 1984 and completed in 2003.
