= Akagawa Dam =

Dam in Tochigi Prefecture, Japan

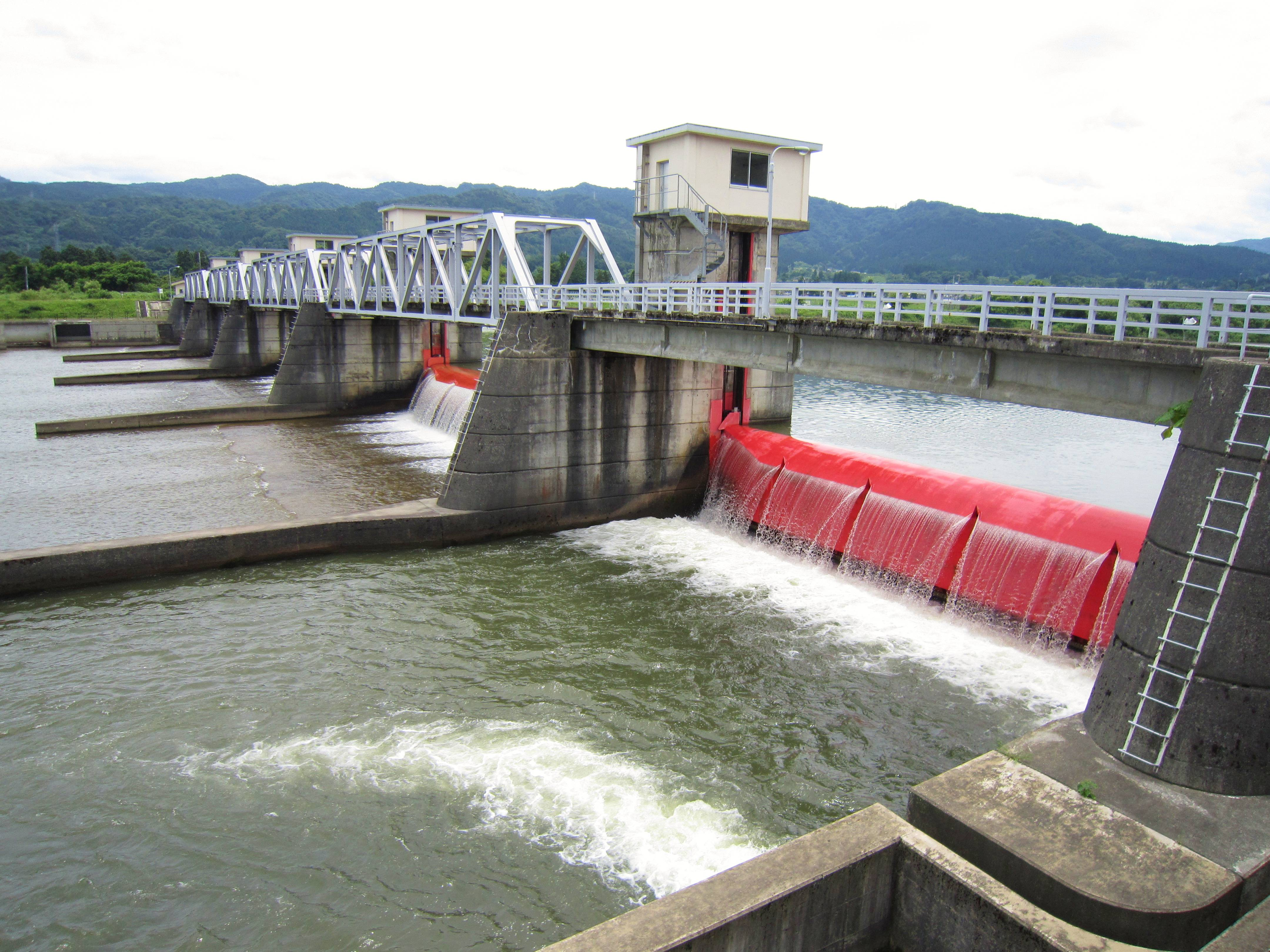

- Location within Japan
- Location: Tochigi Prefecture, Japan
- Coordinates: 36°37′12″N 139°47′26″E
- Construction began: 1965
- Opening date: 1970

Dam and spillways
- Height: 17.5 m (57 ft)
- Length: 221 m (725 ft)

Reservoir
- Total capacity: 327 thousand cubic meters
- Catchment area: 3.2 sq. km
- Surface area: 6 hectares

Akagawa Dam is an asphalt dam located in Tochigi prefecture in Japan. The dam is used for irrigation. The catchment area of the dam is 3.2 km^{2}. The dam impounds about 6 ha of land when full and can store 327 thousand cubic meters of water. The construction of the dam was started on 1965 and completed in 1970.
