= Koshin Dam =

Dam in Tochigi Prefecture, Japan

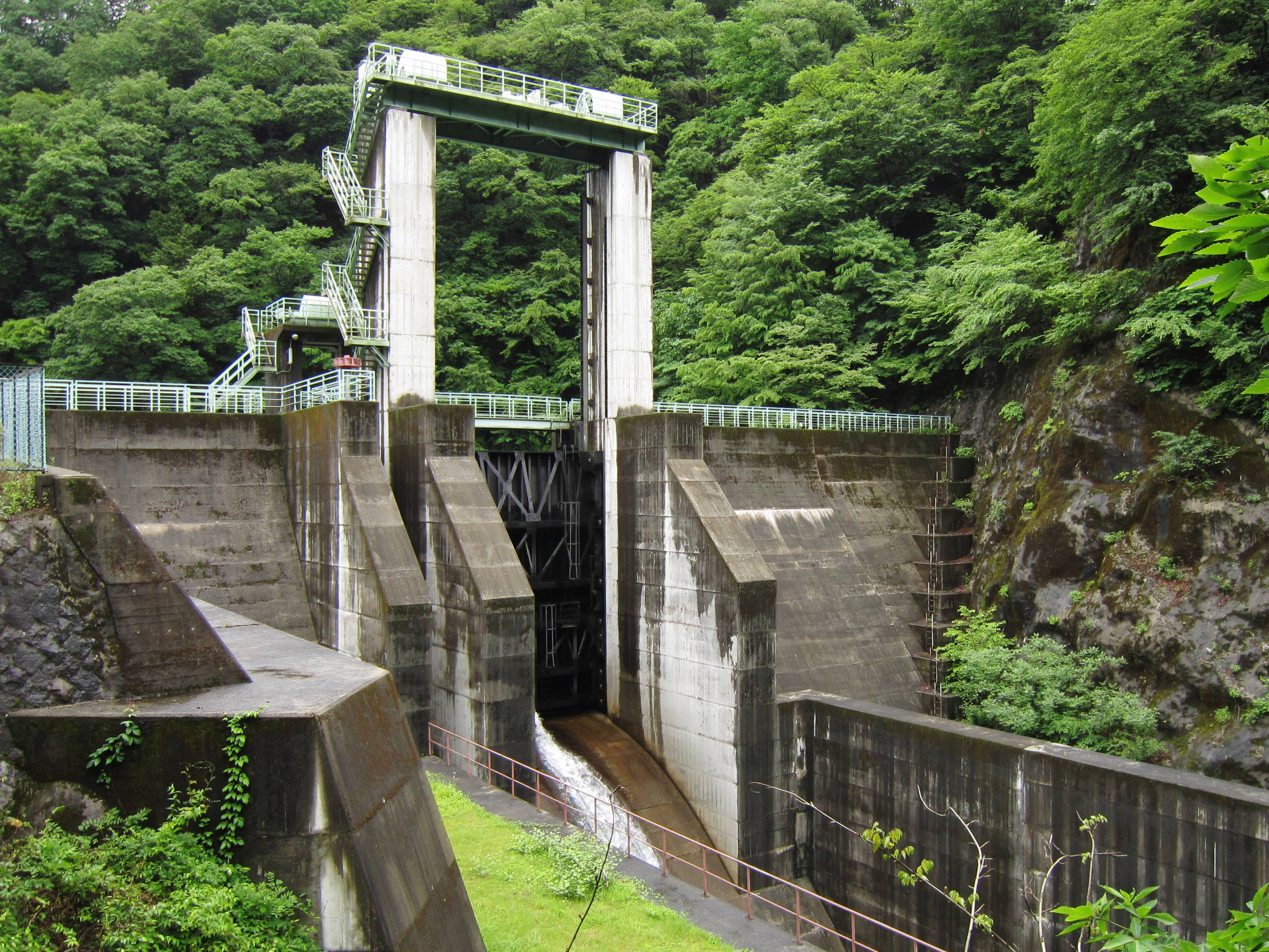

- Location within Japan
- Location: Tochigi Prefecture, Japan
- Coordinates: 36°37′51″N 139°25′15″E
- Construction began: 1975
- Opening date: 1985

Dam and spillways
- Height: 29 m (95 ft)
- Length: 55.9 m (183 ft)

Reservoir
- Total capacity: 195 thousand cubic meters
- Catchment area: 272.2 sq. km
- Surface area: 2 hectares

Koshin Dam is a gravity dam located in Tochigi Prefecture in Japan. The dam is used for power production. The catchment area of the dam is 272.2 km^{2}. It impounds approximately 2 hectares of land when full and can store 195 thousand cubic meters of water. The construction of the dam was started in 1975 and completed in 1985.
