= Imaichi Pumped Storage Power Station =

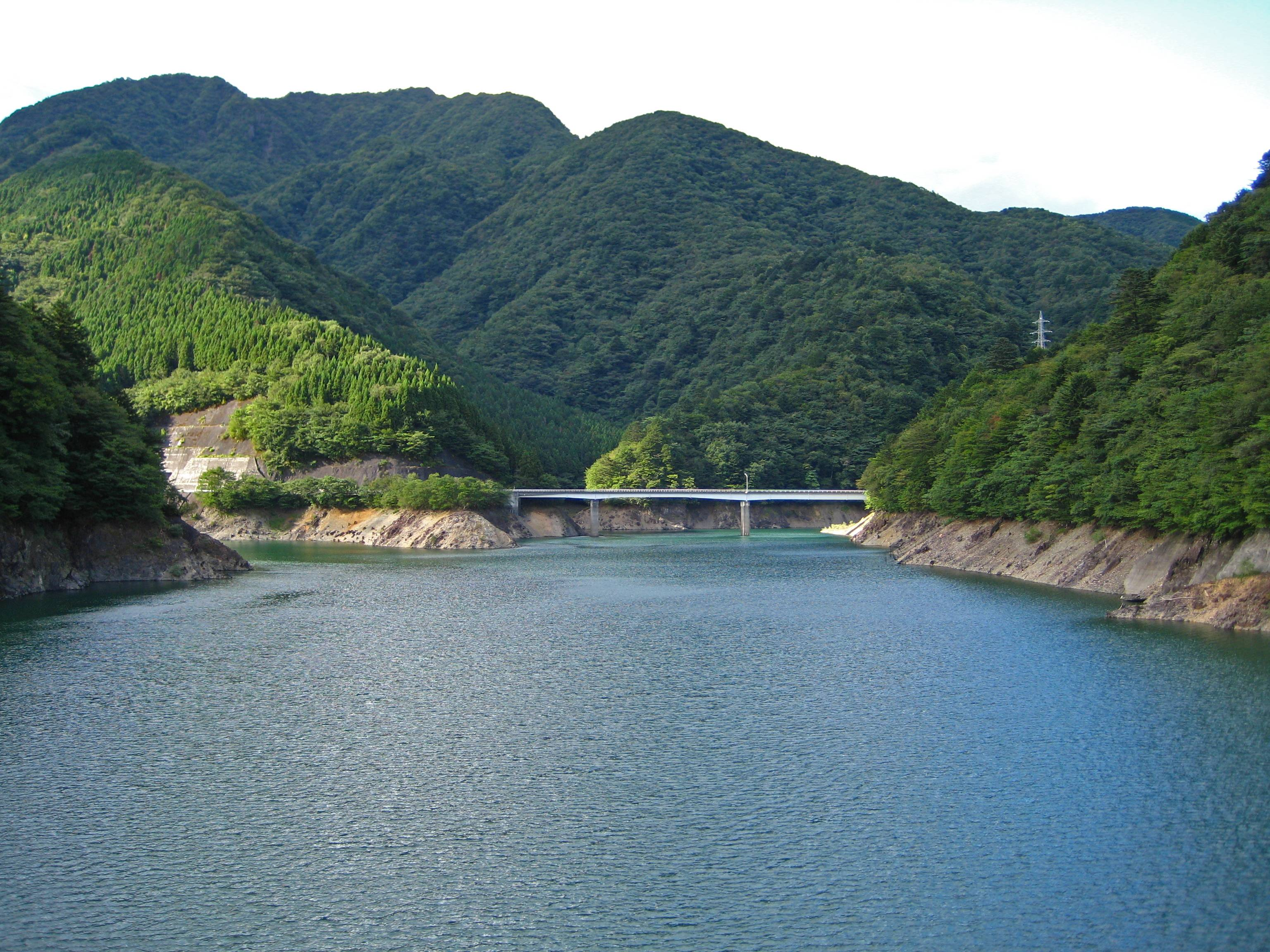
- Imaichi Dam lower reservoir
- Interactive map of Imaichi Pumped Storage Power Station
- Country: Japan
- Location: Nikkō, Tochigi Prefecture
- Coordinates: 36.831927°N 139.667754°E
- Status: Operational
- Construction began: 1979
- Opening date: 1988
- Operator: TEPCO

Upper reservoir
- Creates: Kuriyama

Lower reservoir
- Creates: Imaichi

Power Station
- Hydraulic head: 524 m (1,719 ft)
- Pump-generators: 3 x 350 MW reversible Francis turbines
- Installed capacity: 1,050 MW (1,410,000 hp)
- Storage capacity: 7,350 MW·h

The Imaichi Pumped Storage Power Station (Japanese: 今市発電所, Hepburn: Imaichi Hatsudensho) is a large pumped-storage hydroelectric power station in Tochigi Prefecture, Japan. With a total installed capacity of 1,050 megawatts (1,410,000 hp), it is one of the largest pumped-storage power stations in Japan. The facility is run by the Tokyo Electric Power Company (TEPCO). The power plant started operation in July 1988 with a capacity of 350 MW (one unit operational). The other two units entered operation in December 1991. The plant is one of the many large scale pure pumped-storage plants built in Japan since the 1970s to compensate for the increased penetration of base-load nuclear power and peak load from cooling and air-conditioning.

Like most pumped-storage facilities, the power station uses two reservoirs, releasing and pumping as the demand rises and falls. The upper reservoir is contained by the Imaichi Dam, a concrete gravity dam, at an altitude of 512 m. The reservoir is fed by the Togawa river. The lower reservoir is contained by the Kuriyama Dam, a rock-fill embankment dam at an altitude of 1054 m. The reservoirs can store 9,100,000 cubic metres (7,400 acre⋅ft) of water. Of that storage volume, 6,200,000 cubic metres (5,000 acre⋅ft) can be used for power generation. This is enough for about 7 hours of operation at full generation capacity, giving a total energy storage capacity of about 7.35 GWh.

The power plant is housed in a large cavern 400 m underground and includes three 350 MW Francis reversible pump-turbines. The cavern dimensions are 33.5 m width, 51 m height, and 160 m length. The power station work on a daily or weekly storage cycle. The plant is connected to the high voltage transmission system with a 500 kV power line. These power lines constituted the world's first practical applications of 500 kV XLPE (cross-linked polyethylene) cables, together with the power connection at the Shimogo Pumped Storage Power Station.

== See also ==
- List of power stations in Japan
- Hydroelectricity in Japan
- List of pumped-storage hydroelectric power stations
