= Shiobara Dam =

Dam in Tochigi Prefecture, Japan

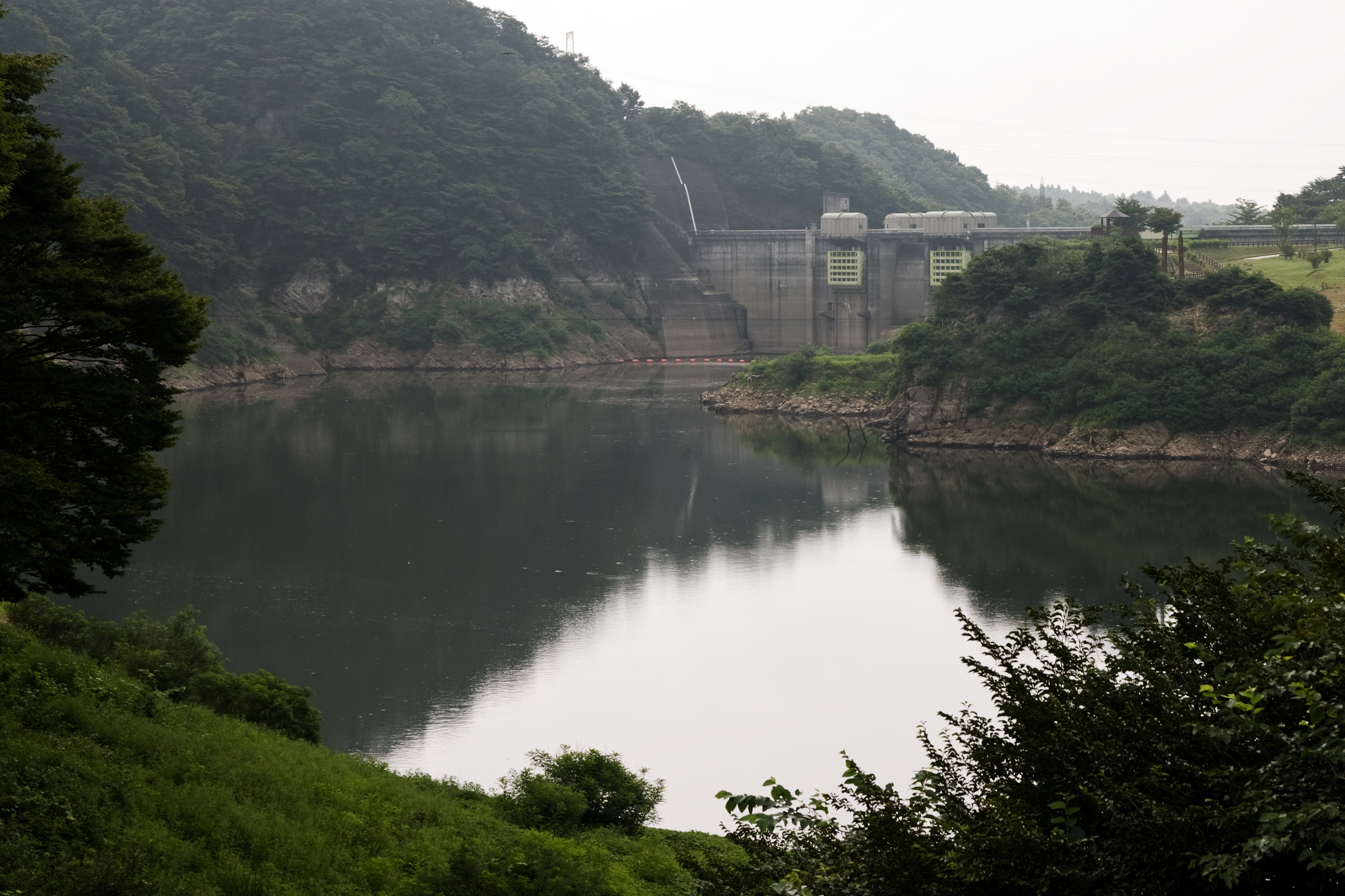

- Location within Japan
- Location: Tochigi Prefecture, Japan
- Coordinates: 36°57′07″N 139°53′05″E
- Construction began: 1969
- Opening date: 1978

Dam and spillways
- Height: 60 m (200 ft)
- Length: 240 m (790 ft)

Reservoir
- Total capacity: 8,760,000 m^{3} (309,000,000 cu ft)
- Catchment area: 119.5 km^{2} (46.1 sq mi)
- Surface area: 41 hectares (100 acres)

Shiobara Dam is a gravity dam located in Tochigi prefecture in Japan. The dam is used for flood control and irrigation. The catchment area of the dam is 119.5 km^{2}. The dam impounds about 41 ha of land when full and can store 8760 thousand cubic meters of water. The construction of the dam was started on 1969 and completed in 1978.
