= Yanome Dam =

Dam in Tochigi Prefecture, Japan

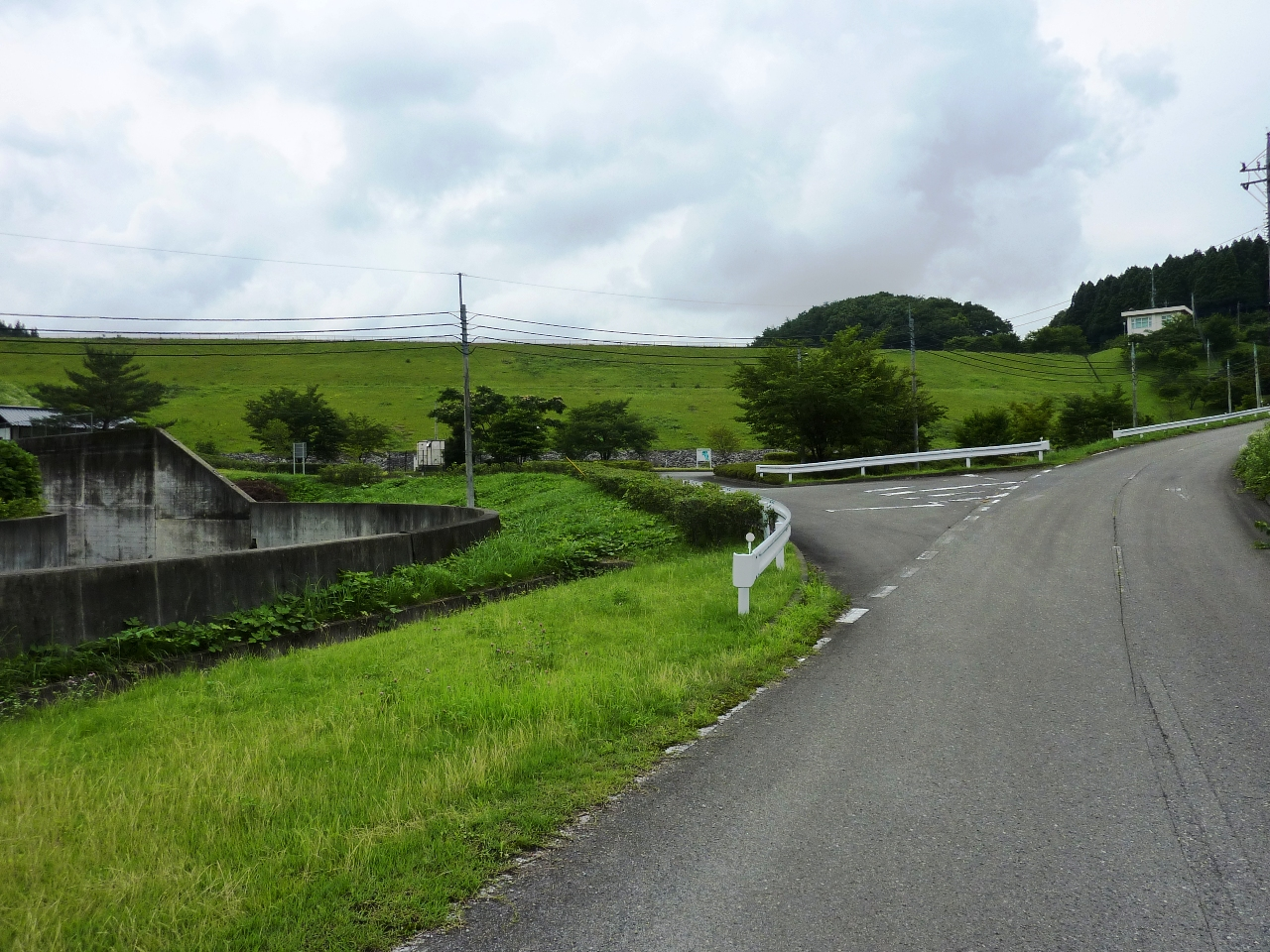

- Location within Japan
- Location: Tochigi Prefecture, Japan
- Coordinates: 37°4′08″N 140°9′06″E
- Construction began: 1976
- Opening date: 1990

Dam and spillways
- Height: 29 m (95 ft)
- Length: 187 m (614 ft)

Reservoir
- Total capacity: 1,100,000 m^{3} (39,000,000 cu ft)
- Catchment area: 8.6 km^{2} (3.3 sq mi)
- Surface area: 14 hectares (35 acres)

Yanome Dam is a rockfill dam located in Tochigi prefecture in Japan. The dam is used for irrigation. The catchment area of the dam is 8.6 km^{2}. The dam impounds about 14 ha of land when full and can store 1100 thousand cubic meters of water. The construction of the dam was started on 1976 and completed in 1990.
