= Nakaiwa Dam =

Dam in Tochigi Prefecture, Japan

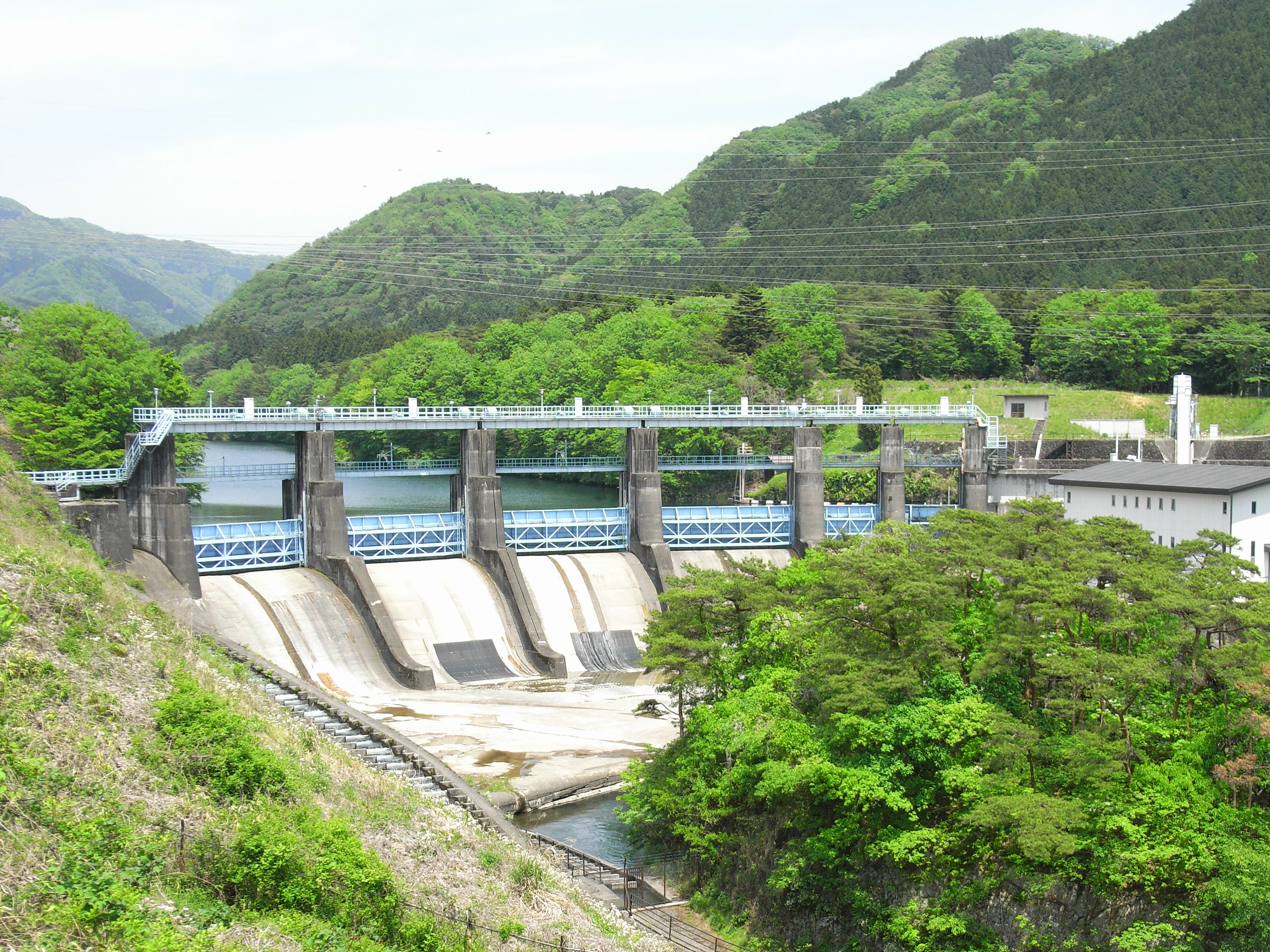

- Location within Japan
- Location: Tochigi Prefecture, Japan
- Coordinates: 36°47′12″N 139°42′14″E
- Construction began: 1922
- Opening date: 1924

Dam and spillways
- Height: 26.3 m (86 ft)
- Length: 107.9 m (354 ft)

Reservoir
- Total capacity: 1488 thousand cubic meters
- Catchment area: 697 sq. km
- Surface area: 12 hectares

Nakaiwa Dam is a gravity dam located in Tochigi prefecture in Japan. The dam is used for power production. The catchment area of the dam is 697 km^{2}. The dam impounds about 12 ha of land when full and can store 1488 thousand cubic meters of water. The construction of the dam was started on 1922 and completed in 1924.
