= Shiota Choseichi Dam =

Dam in Tochigi Prefecture, Japan

- Location within Japan
- Location: Tochigi Prefecture, Japan
- Coordinates: 36°36′57″N 140°6′56″E
- Construction began: 1982
- Opening date: 2000

Dam and spillways
- Height: 29 m (95 ft)
- Length: 460 m (1,510 ft)

Reservoir
- Total capacity: 1,580,000 m^{3} (56,000,000 cu ft)
- Catchment area: 0.3 km^{2} (0.12 sq mi)
- Surface area: 12 hectares (30 acres)

Shiota Choseichi Dam is a rockfill dam located in Tochigi prefecture in Japan. The dam is used for irrigation. The catchment area of the dam is 0.3 km^{2}. The dam impounds about 12 ha of land when full and can store 1580 thousand cubic meters of water. The construction of the dam was started on 1982 and completed in 2000.
