= Yashio Dam (Tochigi) =

Dam in Tochigi Prefecture, Japan

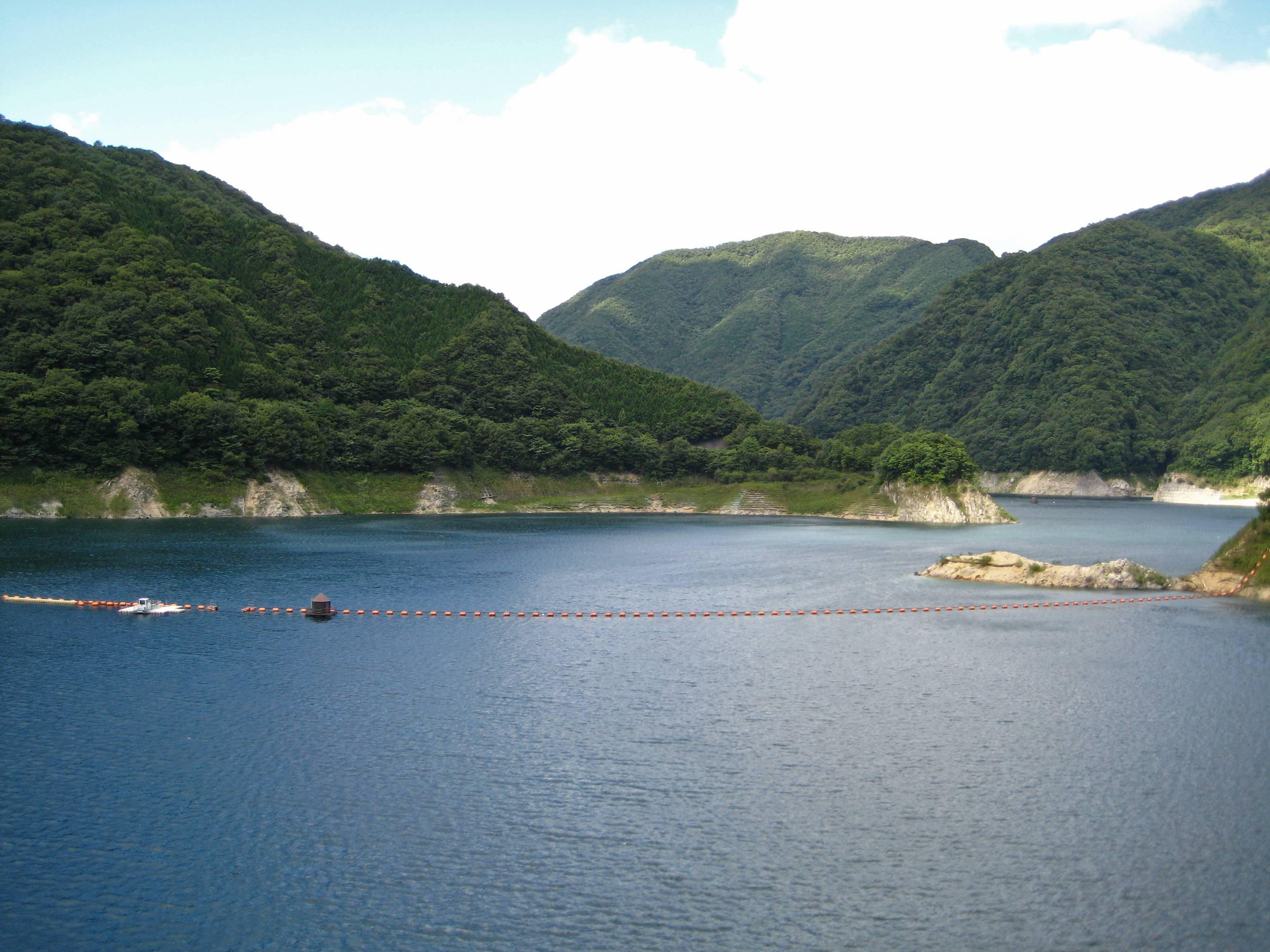

- Location within Japan
- Location: Tochigi Prefecture, Japan
- Coordinates: 36°59′09″N 139°51′11″E
- Construction began: 1986
- Opening date: 1992

Dam and spillways
- Height: 90.5 m (297 ft)
- Length: 263 m (863 ft)

Reservoir
- Total capacity: 11,900,000 m^{3} (420,000,000 cu ft)
- Catchment area: 2 km^{2} (0.77 sq mi)
- Surface area: 47 hectares (120 acres)

Yashio Dam is an asphalt dam located in Tochigi prefecture in Japan. The dam is used for power production. The catchment area of the dam is 2 km^{2}. The dam impounds about 47 ha of land when full and can store 11900 thousand cubic meters of water. The construction of the dam was started on 1986 and completed in 1992.
