= Sakasegawa Dam =

Dam in Tochigi Prefecture, Japan

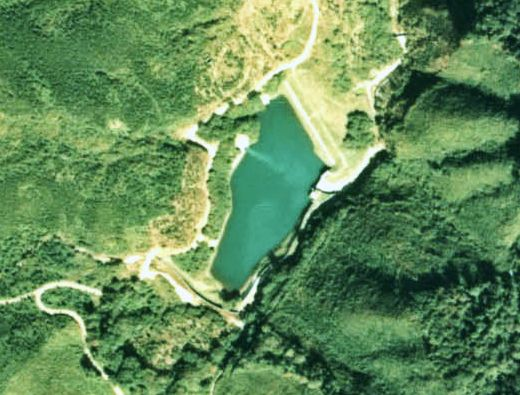
- Sakasegawa Dam

- Location within Japan
- Location: Tochigi Prefecture, Japan
- Coordinates: 36°51′03″N 139°41′10″E
- Construction began: 1911
- Opening date: 1912

Dam and spillways
- Height: 18.2 m (60 ft)
- Length: 121.2 m (398 ft)

Reservoir
- Total capacity: 92,000 m^{3} (3,200,000 cu ft)
- Catchment area: 277 km^{2} (107 sq mi)
- Surface area: 2 hectares (4.9 acres)

Sakasegawa Dam is an earthfill dam located in Tochigi prefecture in Japan. The dam is used for power production. The catchment area of the dam is 277 km^{2}. The dam impounds about 2 ha of land when full and can store 92 thousand cubic meters of water. The construction of the dam was started on 1911 and completed in 1912.
