= Chiburi Dam =

Dam in Tochigi Prefecture, Japan

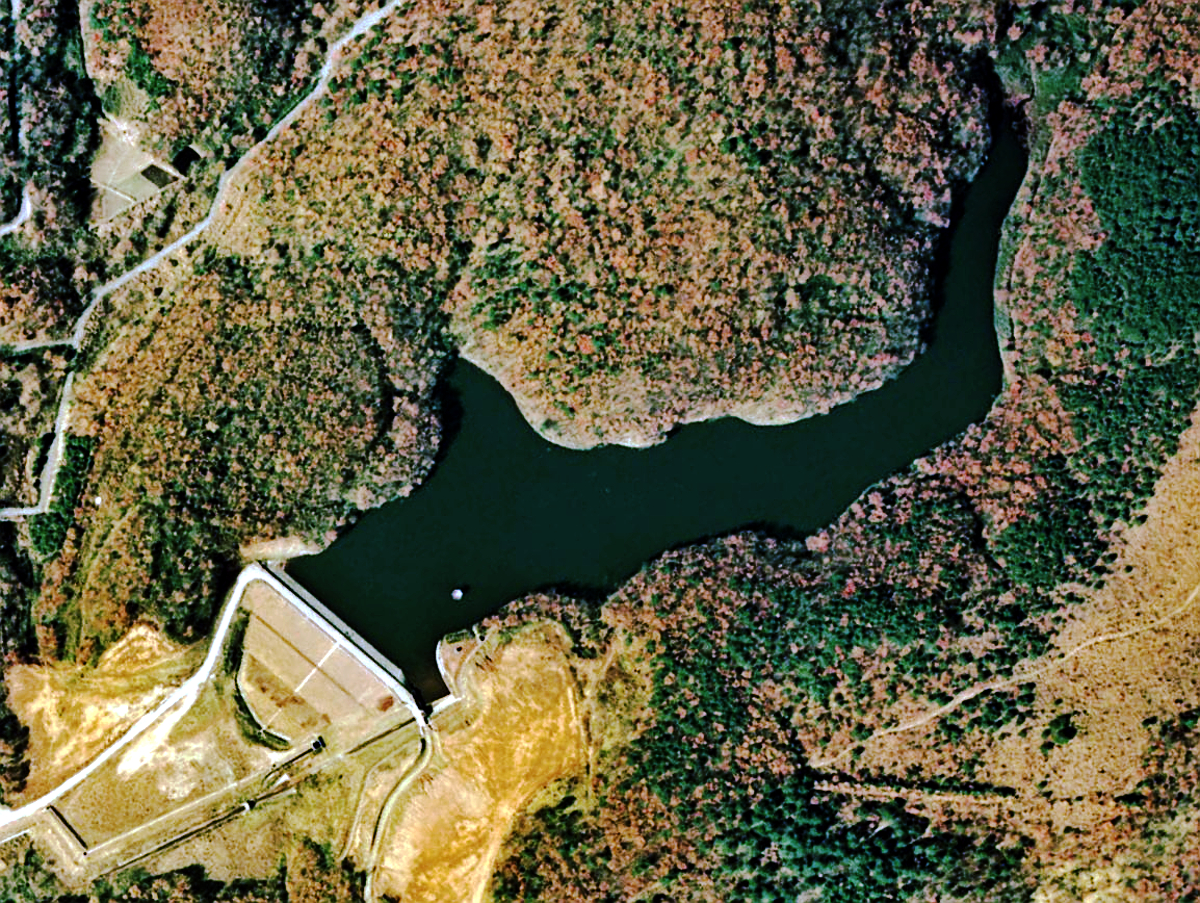

- Location within Japan
- Interactive map of Chiburi Dam
- Location: Tochigi Prefecture, Japan
- Coordinates: 37°5′40″N 140°5′57″E
- Construction began: 1966
- Opening date: 1971

Dam and spillways
- Height: 23 m (75 ft)
- Length: 130 m (430 ft)

Reservoir
- Total capacity: 354 thousand cubic meters
- Catchment area: 1.7 sq. km
- Surface area: 5 hectares

Chiburi Dam is a rockfill dam located in Tochigi prefecture in Japan. The dam is used for irrigation. The catchment area of the dam is 1.7 km^{2}. The dam impounds about 5 ha of land when full and can store 354 thousand cubic meters of water. The construction of the dam was started on 1966 and completed in 1971.
