= Ohgoto Dam =

Dam in Tochigi Prefecture, Japan

- Location within Japan
- Location: Tochigi Prefecture, Japan
- Coordinates: 36°24′34″N 140°6′13″E
- Construction began: 1976
- Opening date: 1986

Dam and spillways
- Height: 27.7 m (91 ft)
- Length: 150 m (490 ft)

Reservoir
- Total capacity: 289,000 m^{3} (10,200,000 cu ft)
- Catchment area: 1.6 km^{2} (0.62 sq mi)
- Surface area: 5 hectares (12 acres)

Ohgoto Dam is a rockfill dam located in Tochigi prefecture in Japan. The dam is used for irrigation. The catchment area of the dam is 1.6 km^{2}. The dam impounds about 5 ha of land when full and can store 289 thousand cubic meters of water. The construction of the dam was started on 1976 and completed in 1986.
