= Shioda Dam =

Dam in Tochigi Prefecture, Japan

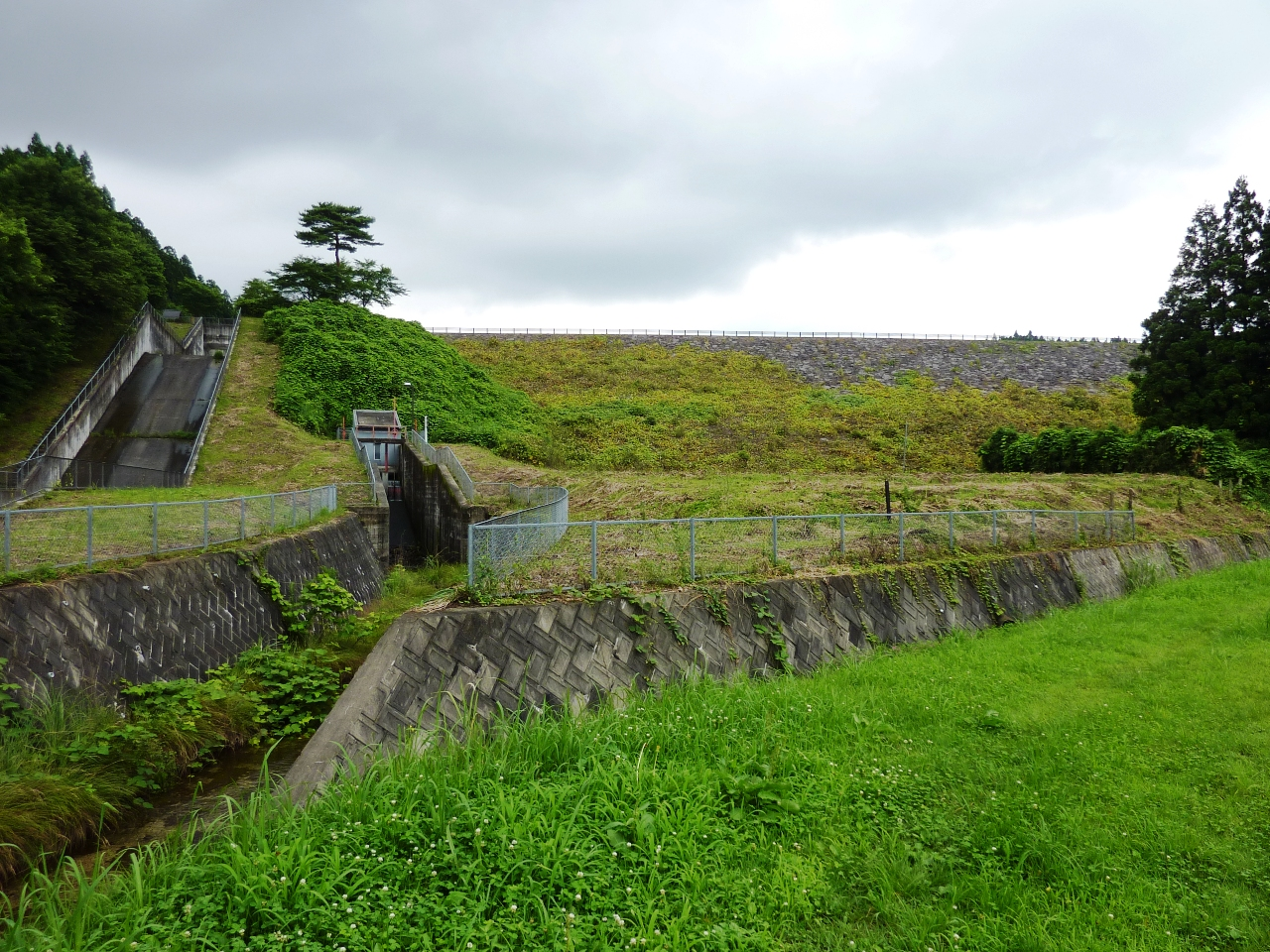

- Location within Japan
- Location: Tochigi Prefecture, Japan
- Coordinates: 36°49′34″N 139°52′30″E
- Construction began: 1977
- Opening date: 2000

Dam and spillways
- Height: 26.1 m (86 ft)
- Length: 218 m (715 ft)

Reservoir
- Total capacity: 460,000 m^{3} (16,000,000 cu ft)
- Catchment area: 2.6 km^{2} (1.0 sq mi)
- Surface area: 6 hectares (15 acres)

Shioda Dam is a rockfill dam located in Tochigi prefecture in Japan. The dam is used for irrigation. The catchment area of the dam is 2.6 km^{2}. The dam impounds about 6 ha of land when full and can store 460 thousand cubic meters of water. The construction of the dam was started on 1977 and completed in 2000.
