= Dorobu Dam =

Dam in Tochigi Prefecture, Japan

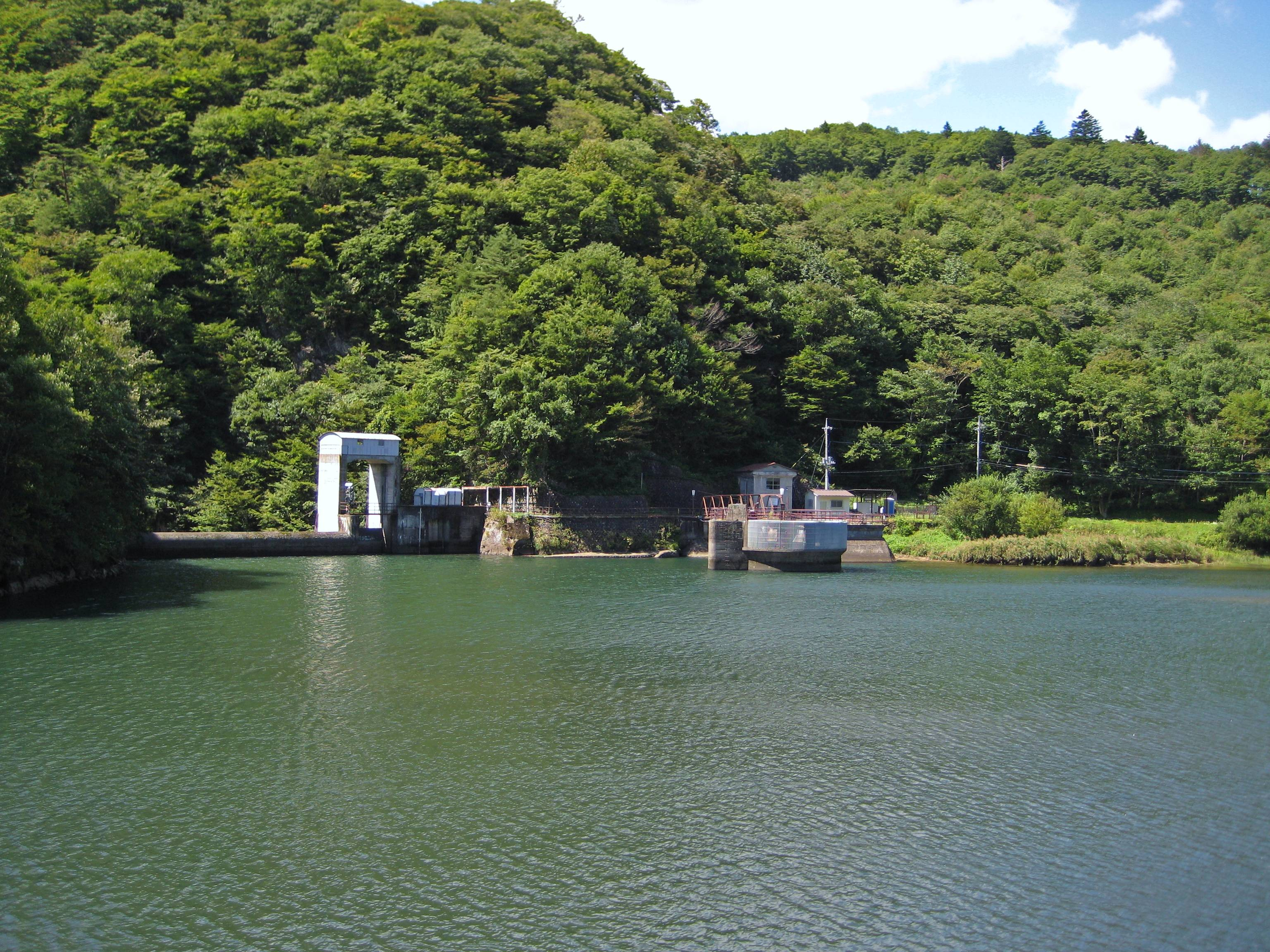

- Location within Japan
- Interactive map of Dorobu Dam
- Location: Tochigi Prefecture, Japan
- Coordinates: 36°52′31″N 139°35′05″E
- Construction began: 1962
- Opening date: 1963

Dam and spillways
- Height: 21.6 m (71 ft)
- Length: 56 m (184 ft)

Reservoir
- Total capacity: 225 thousand cubic meters
- Catchment area: 199 sq. km
- Surface area: 3 hectares

Dorobu Dam is a gravity dam located in Tochigi prefecture in Japan. The dam is used for power production. The catchment area of the dam is 199 km^{2}. The dam impounds about 3 ha of land when full and can store 225 thousand cubic meters of water. The construction of the dam was started on 1962 and completed in 1963.
