= Terayama Dam =

Dam in Tochigi Prefecture, Japan

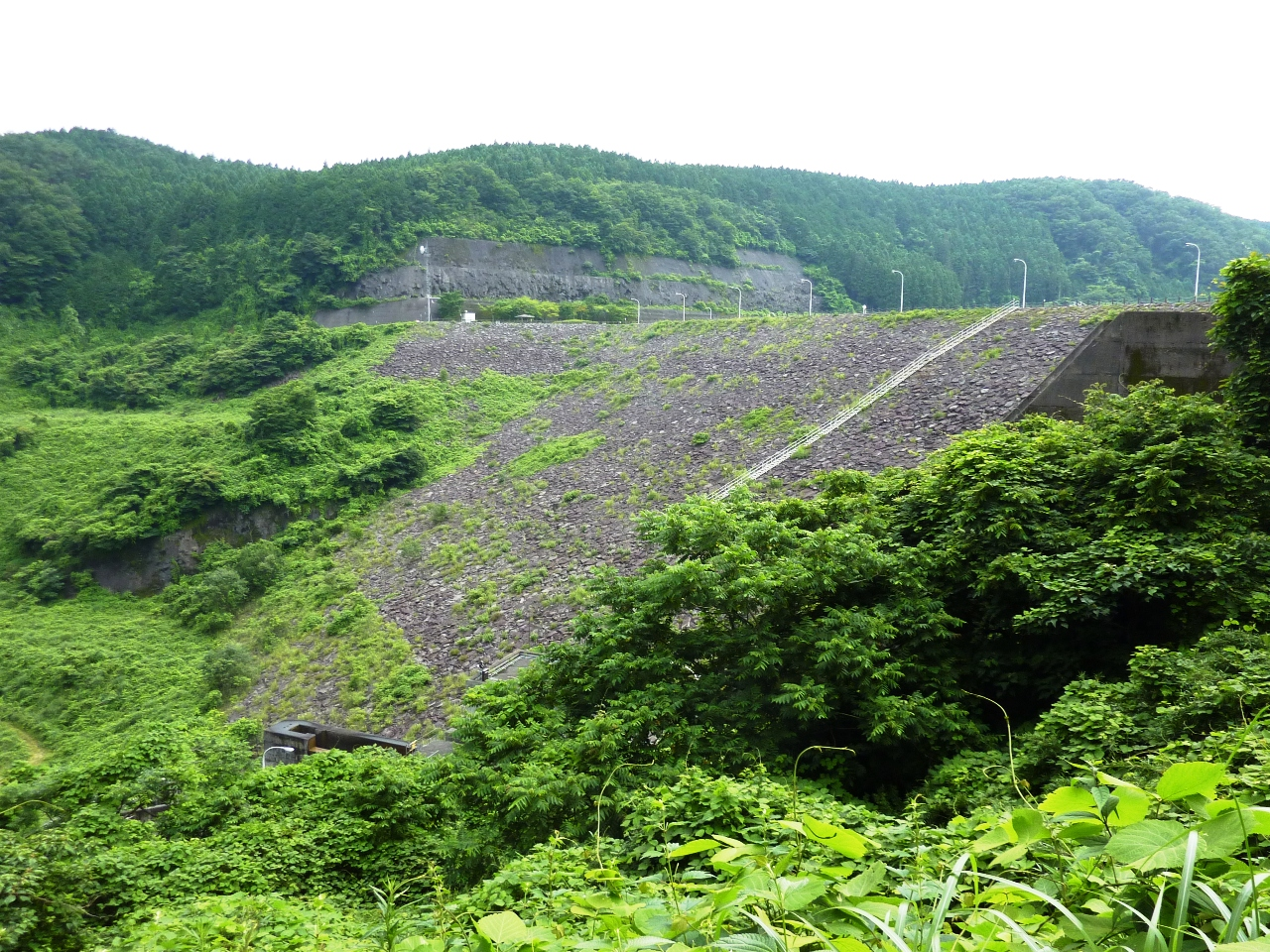

- Location within Japan
- Location: Tochigi Prefecture, Japan
- Coordinates: 36°50′50″N 139°51′52″E
- Construction began: 1972
- Opening date: 1984

Dam and spillways
- Height: 62.2 m (204 ft)
- Length: 260 m (850 ft)

Reservoir
- Total capacity: 2,550,000 m^{3} (90,000,000 cu ft)
- Catchment area: 11.5 km^{2} (4.4 sq mi)
- Surface area: 16 hectares (40 acres)

Terayama Dam is a rockfill dam located in Tochigi prefecture in Japan. The dam is used for flood control and water supply. The catchment area of the dam is 11.5 km^{2}. The dam impounds about 16 ha of land when full and can store 2550 thousand cubic meters of water. The construction of the dam was started on 1972 and completed in 1984.
