= Kuriyama Dam (Tochigi) =

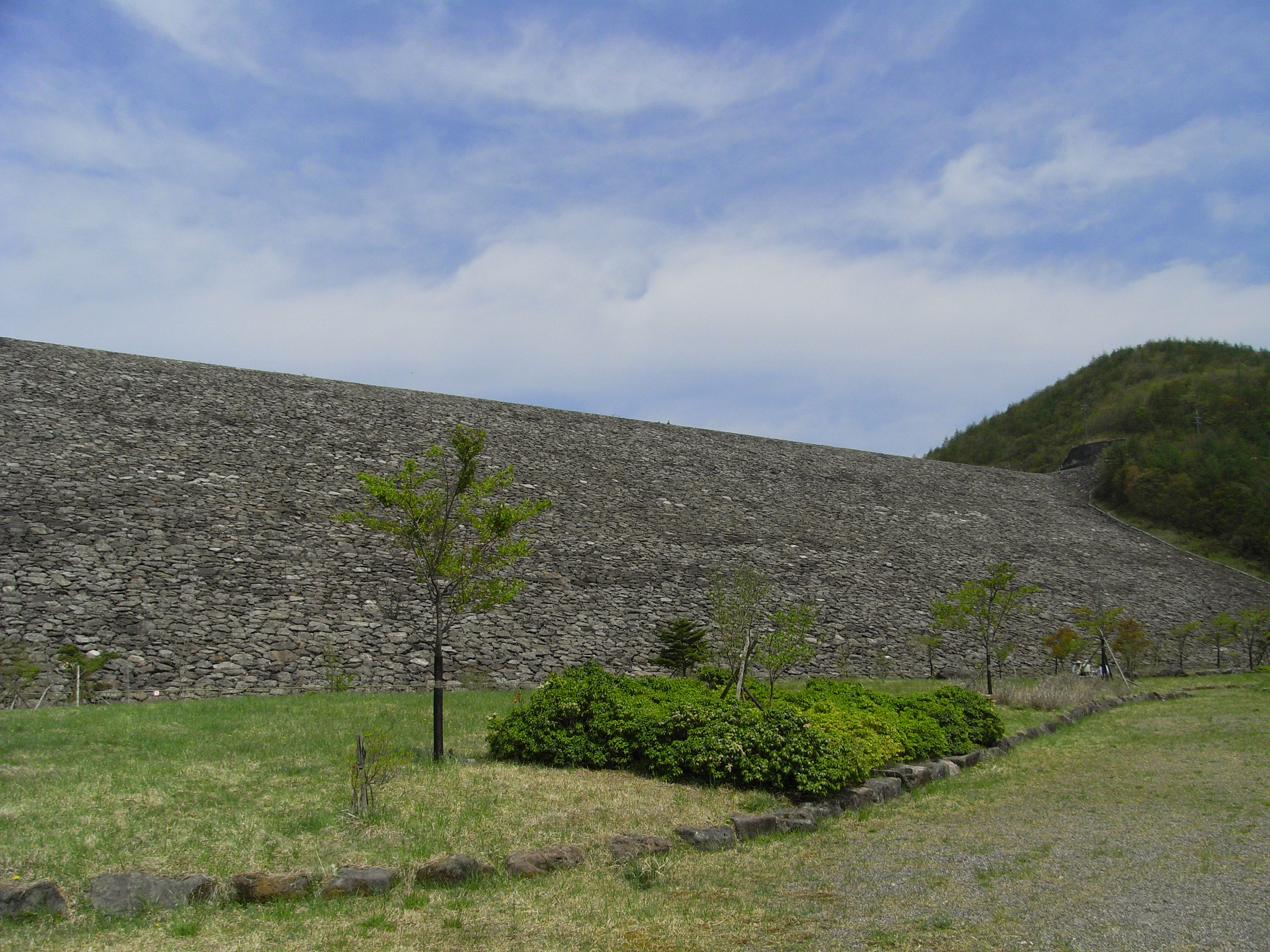

- Location within Japan
- Country: Japan
- Location: Nikkō, Tochigi Prefecture
- Coordinates: 36°51′08″N 139°39′10″E
- Status: Operational
- Construction began: 1981
- Opening date: 1985
- Owner: TEPCO

Dam and spillways
- Type of dam: Embankment, rock-fill
- Height: 97.5 m (320 ft)
- Length: 340 m (1,115 ft)
- Dam volume: 2,517,000 m^{3} (3,292,112 cu yd)

Reservoir
- Total capacity: 6,890,000 m^{3} (5,586 acre⋅ft)
- Active capacity: 6,200,000 m^{3} (5,026 acre⋅ft)
- Catchment area: 900 m^{2} (0 acres)
- Surface area: 320 m^{2} (0 acres)
- Normal elevation: 1,090 m (3,576 ft)

The Kuriyama Dam is a rock-fill embankment dam on a tributary of the Togawa River located 6.4 km (4 mi) northwest of Nikkō in Tochigi Prefecture, Japan. It was constructed between 1981 and 1985. Its reservoir serves as the upper reservoir for the 1,050 MW Imaichi Pumped Storage Power Station, while the Imaichi Dam forms the lower. The dam is 97.5 m (320 ft) tall and withholds a reservoir with a storage capacity of 6,890,000 m^{3} (5,586 acre⋅ft). Of that capacity, 6,200,000 m^{3} (5,026 acre⋅ft) is used to produce electricity at the power plant. It is owned and operated by TEPCO.
