= Imaichi Dam =

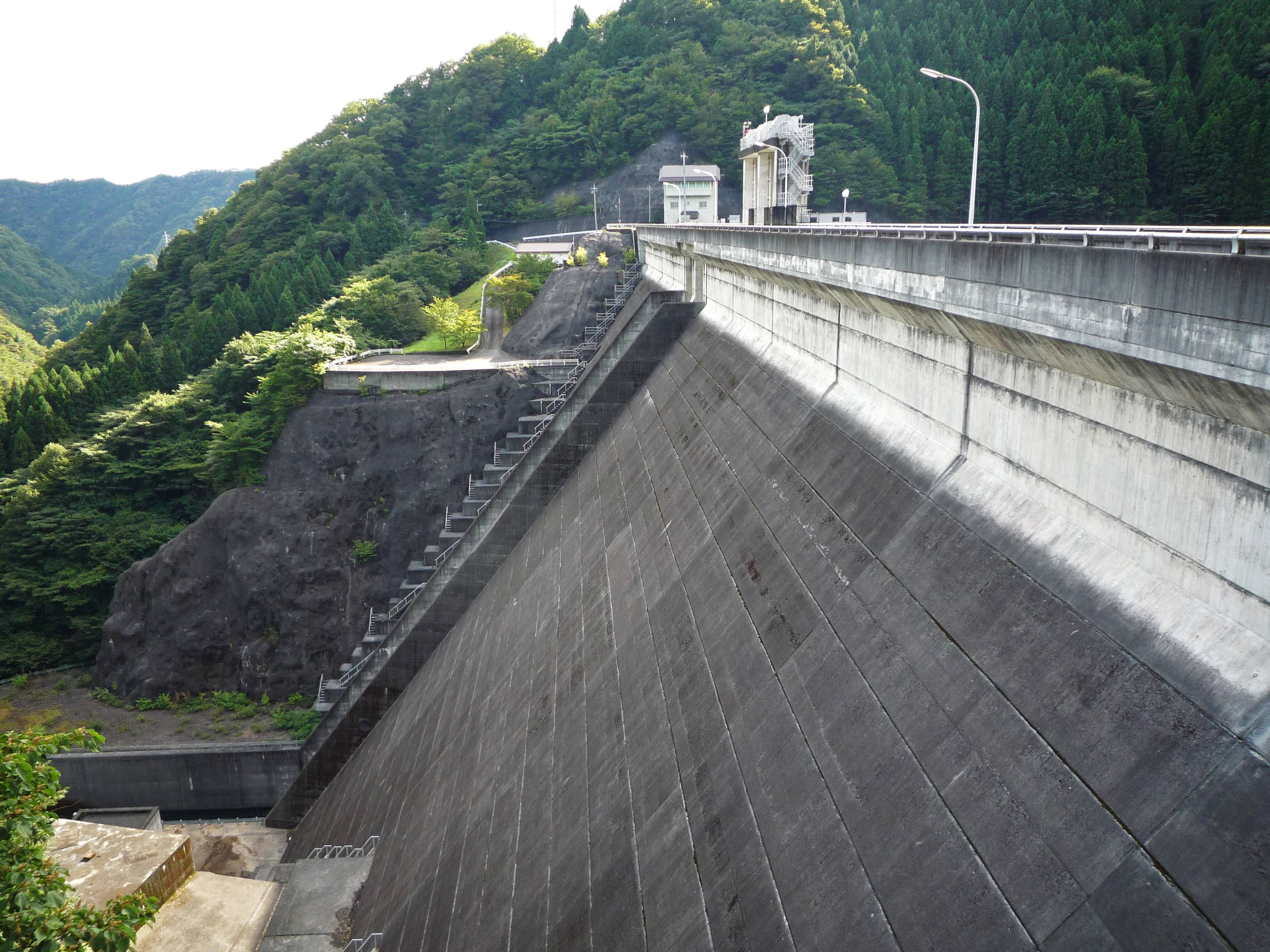

- Location within Japan
- Country: Japan
- Location: Nikkō, Tochigi Prefecture
- Coordinates: 36°49′31″N 139°39′58″E
- Status: Operational
- Construction began: 1979
- Opening date: 1986
- Owner: TEPCO

Dam and spillways
- Type of dam: Gravity, concrete
- Impounds: Togawa River
- Height: 75.5 m (248 ft)
- Length: 177 m (581 ft)
- Elevation at crest: 551 m (1,808 ft)
- Dam volume: 192,000 m^{3} (251,127 cu yd)
- Spillway capacity: 1,620 m^{3}/s (57,210 cu ft/s)

Reservoir
- Total capacity: 9,100,000 m^{3} (7,377 acre⋅ft)
- Active capacity: 6,200,000 m^{3} (5,026 acre⋅ft)
- Catchment area: 14.8 km^{2} (6 mi^{2})
- Surface area: 380 m^{2} (0 acres)
- Normal elevation: 548.5 m (1,800 ft)

Power Station
- Commission date: 1988
- Hydraulic head: 524 m (1,719 ft)
- Turbines: 3 x 350 MW (470,000 hp) Francis pump turbines
- Installed capacity: 1,050 MW (1,410,000 hp)

The Imaichi Dam (今市ダム) is a concrete gravity dam on the Togawa River located 4 kilometres (2.5 mi) west of Nikkō in Tochigi Prefecture, Japan. The dam serves as the lower reservoir for the 1,050 megawatts (1,410,000 hp) Imaichi Pumped Storage Power Station, while the Kuriyama Dam forms the upper. It is owned by TEPCO and was constructed between 1979 and 1986. The reservoir can store 9,100,000 cubic metres (7,400 acre⋅ft) of water. Of that storage volume, 6,200,000 cubic metres (5,000 acre⋅ft) can be used for power generation.

== Imaichi Pumped Storage Power Station ==
The power plant operates using the pumped storage hydroelectric method. During periods of high electricity demand, water is sent from the upper Kuriyama Reservoir to the power plant which contains 3 x 350 megawatts (470,000 hp) Francis pump turbines. Water discharged from the power plant then enters the Imaichi Reservoir. When demand is low, the pump-generators reverse mode and pump water from the lower reservoir back up to the upper. The process repeats as needed.

== See also ==
- List of dams and reservoirs in Japan
