= List of dams in Yamagata Prefecture =

The following is a list of dams in Yamagata Prefecture, Japan.

== List ==
Name	Location	Started	Opened	Height	Length	Image	DiJ number
Akashiba Dam			1954	31.8 m (104 ft)	57.3 m (188 ft)		0423
Arasawa Dam		1949	1955	63 m (207 ft)	195.5 m (641 ft)		0424
Atsumigawa Dam		1973	1986	60 m (200 ft)	167 m (548 ft)		0441
Awataki Dam							
Birusawa Tameike Dam			1994	23.5 m (77 ft)	190 m (620 ft)		0415
Bonjigawa Dam		1932	1933	40.9 m (134 ft)	62.4 m (205 ft)		0408
Domisawa Tameike Dam			1929	19.5 m (64 ft)	145 m (476 ft)		0405
Fujita Tameike			2003	18.8 m (62 ft)	70 m (230 ft)		0421
Furomurotsutsumi Dam			1948	16 m (52 ft)	64 m (210 ft)		3400
Fushikuma Dam			1945	17.5 m (57 ft)	96 m (315 ft)		3398
Gakkogawa Dam		1970	1978	48 m (157 ft)	205 m (673 ft)		0438
Ginzangawa Dam			1963	21.3 m (70 ft)	60 m (200 ft)		0430
Gassan Dam		1976	2001	123 m (404 ft)	393 m (1,289 ft)		0447
Heita Tameike Dam		1953	1958	15.9 m (52 ft)	56.9 m (187 ft)		3402
Higashiotori Dam							
Hijiori Dam		1950	1952				
Hikiryu No.2 Dam			2002	25.3 m (83 ft)	122 m (400 ft)		0420
Ichinosawa Dam			1998	26.5 m (87 ft)	128 m (420 ft)		0431
Kanno Dam							
Kamigo Dam		1961	1962	23.5 m (77 ft)	166 m (545 ft)		0429
Kamuro Dam		1977	1993	60.6 m (199 ft)	257 m (843 ft)		0445
Kijiyama Dam		1957	1960	46 m (151 ft)	168.2 m (552 ft)		0428
Kikawa Dam		1956	1958	31.5 m (103 ft)	73.5 m (241 ft)		0426
Koiragawa Dam		1963	1965	21.9 m (72 ft)	67 m (220 ft)		3585
Koyamagasawa Tameike Dam			2000	17.5 m (57 ft)	157.3 m (516 ft)		0417
Maeda Dam			1951	15.2 m (50 ft)	53.5 m (176 ft)		3401
Maekawa Dam		1971	1982	50 m (160 ft)	265.5 m (871 ft)		0440
Masuzawa Damu			1963	65.8 m (216 ft)	194.8 m (639 ft)		0432
Matsuzawa Tameike Dam			1920	21 m (69 ft)	209 m (686 ft)		0404
Mitsumata Dam		1968	1977	24 m (79 ft)	97 m (318 ft)		3348
Mizugatoro Dam		1980	1990	34 m (112 ft)	372 m (1,220 ft)		0446
Mizukubo Dam			1975	62 m (203 ft)	205 m (673 ft)		0437
Mogamiogunigawa Dam		Feb 2015	Mar 2020	41 m (135 ft)			3250
Mogami Shirakawa Sabo Dam							
Motosawa Dam		1991	2004	17.5 m (57 ft)	81.2 m (266 ft)		3366
Nagai Dam		1979	2010	125.5 m (412 ft)	381 m (1,250 ft)		0448
Namaigawa Dam		1979	1992	47.8 m (157 ft)	313.7 m (1,029 ft)		0450
Nishiotori Dam							
Ochiai Dam			1958	15.5 m (51 ft)	63 m (207 ft)		3603
Osagasawa Dam							
Sagae Dam		1972	1990	112 m (367 ft)	510 m (1,670 ft)		0444
Sakyobuchi Dam							
Senbacho Tameike Dam			1990	20.5 m (67 ft)	91.5 m (300 ft)		0414
Shintsuruko Dam		1972	1990	96 m (315 ft)	283.9 m (931 ft)		0443
Shiraishiyama Dam			1991	15.9 m (52 ft)	88 m (289 ft)		0403
Shirakawa Dam		1968	1981	66 m (217 ft)	348.2 m (1,142 ft)		0439
Shiromizu Dam		1974	1990	54.5 m (179 ft)	367 m (1,204 ft)		0442
Shobugawa Dam			1973	31.1 m (102 ft)	210 m (690 ft)		0436
Tachiyazawagawa No.1 Dam			1938	24 m (79 ft)	58.5 m (192 ft)		0411
Takasaka Dam		1962	1967	57 m (187 ft)	118.7 m (389 ft)		0434
Tateyama Tameike Dam			1950	18.6 m (61 ft)	86 m (282 ft)		0418
Tazawagawa Dam		1981	2001	81 m (266 ft)	185 m (607 ft)		0449
Tomeyamagawa Dam		1990	2011	46 m (151 ft)	115 m (377 ft)		3200
Tonosawa Dam			1988	18 m (59 ft)	90 m (300 ft)		0416
Tsunakigawa Dam		1984	2007	74 m (243 ft)	367.5 m (1,206 ft)		0451
Tsuruko Dam			1959				
Umagami Tameike Dam			1986	24.8 m (81 ft)	123.2 m (404 ft)		0419
Yakuwa Dam			1957	97.5 m (320 ft)	269 m (883 ft)		0425
Yokokawa Dam				72.5 m (238 ft)			2962
Zao Dam		1965	1969	66 m (217 ft)	273.8 m (898 ft)		0435

== See also ==
- Media related to Dams in Yamagata prefecture at Wikimedia Commons
