= Ochiai Dam =

Ochiai Dam may refer to:

- Ochiai Dam (Hokkaido)
- Ochiai Dam (Gifu)
- Ochiai Dam (Yamagata)
