= Shirakawa Dam =

ShirakawaDam may refer to:

- Shirakawa Dam (Nara)
- Shirakawa Dam (Yamagata)
