= Birusawa Tameike Dam =

Dam in Yamagata Prefecture, Japan

Birusawa Tameike
- Location within Japan
- Interactive map of Birusawa Tameike
- Location: Yamagata Prefecture, Japan
- Coordinates: 38°1′48″N 140°14′07″E
- Opening date: 1994

Dam and spillways
- Height: 23.5 m (77 ft)
- Length: 190 m (620 ft)

Reservoir
- Total capacity: 2075 thousand cubic meters
- Catchment area: sq. km
- Surface area: 24 hectares

Birusawa Tameike is an earthfill dam located in Yamagata Prefecture in Japan. The dam is used for irrigation. The catchment area of the dam is km^{2}. The dam impounds about 24 ha of land when full and can store 2075 thousand cubic meters of water. The construction of the dam was completed in 1994.
