= Maeda Dam =

Dam in Yamagata Prefecture, Japan

- Location within Japan
- Location: Yamagata Prefecture, Japan
- Coordinates: 38°20′42″N 140°12′19″E
- Opening date: 1951

Dam and spillways
- Height: 15.2 m (50 ft)
- Length: 53.5 m (176 ft)

Reservoir
- Total capacity: 37 thousand cubic meters
- Catchment area: 0.8 sq. km
- Surface area: 1 hectares

Maeda Dam is an earthfill dam located in Yamagata Prefecture in Japan. The dam is used for irrigation. The catchment area of the dam is 0.8 km^{2}. The dam impounds about 1 ha of land when full and can store 37 thousand cubic meters of water. The construction of the dam was completed in 1951.
