= Shiraishiyama Dam =

Dam in Yamagata Prefecture, Japan

- Location within Japan
- Location: Yamagata Prefecture, Japan
- Coordinates: 38°29′15″N 140°17′34″E
- Opening date: 1991

Dam and spillways
- Height: 15.9 m (52 ft)
- Length: 88 m (289 ft)

Reservoir
- Total capacity: 46,000 m^{3} (1,600,000 cu ft)
- Catchment area: sq. km
- Surface area: 1 hectare (2.5 acres)

Shiraishiyama Dam is an earthfill dam located in Yamagata Prefecture in Japan. The dam is used for irrigation. The catchment area of the dam is km^{2}. The dam impounds about 1 ha of land when full and can store 46 thousand cubic meters of water. The construction of the dam was completed in 1991.
