= Masuzawa Dam =

Dam in Yamagata Prefecture, Japan

- Location within Japan
- Location: Yamagata Prefecture, Japan
- Coordinates: 38°51′32″N 140°22′40″E
- Opening date: 1963

Dam and spillways
- Height: 65.8 m (216 ft)
- Length: 194.8 m (639 ft)

Reservoir
- Total capacity: 6805 thousand cubic meters
- Catchment area: 29.8 sq. km
- Surface area: 45 hectares

Masuzawa Dam is a gravity dam located in Yamagata Prefecture in Japan. The dam is used for irrigation. The catchment area of the dam is 29.8 km^{2}. The dam impounds about 45 ha of land when full and can store 6805 thousand cubic meters of water. The construction of the dam was completed in 1963.
