= Kikawa Dam =

Dam in Yamagata Prefecture, Japan

- Location within Japan
- Location: Yamagata Prefecture, Japan
- Coordinates: 38°17′00″N 140°2′15″E
- Construction began: 1956
- Opening date: 1958

Dam and spillways
- Height: 31.5 m (103 ft)
- Length: 73.5 m (241 ft)

Reservoir
- Total capacity: 840 thousand cubic meters
- Catchment area: 82.7 sq. km
- Surface area: 9 hectares

Kikawa Dam is a gravity dam located in Yamagata Prefecture in Japan. The dam is used for power production. The catchment area of the dam is 82.7 km^{2}. The dam impounds about 9 ha of land when full and can store 840 thousand cubic meters of water. The construction of the dam was started on 1956 and completed in 1958.
