= Fujita Tameike =

Dam in Yamagata Prefecture, Japan

- Location within Japan
- Interactive map of Fujita Tameike
- Location: Yamagata Prefecture, Japan
- Coordinates: 38°21′14″N 140°11′45″E
- Opening date: 2003

Dam and spillways
- Height: 18.8 m (62 ft)
- Length: 70 m (230 ft)

Reservoir
- Total capacity: 163 thousand cubic meters
- Catchment area: sq. km
- Surface area: 3 hectares

Fujita Tameike is an earthfill dam located in Yamagata Prefecture in Japan. The dam is used for irrigation. The catchment area of the dam is km^{2}. The dam impounds about 3 ha of land when full and can store 163 thousand cubic meters of water. The construction of the dam was completed in 2003.
