= Senbacho Tameike Dam =

Dam in Yamagata Prefecture, Japan

Senbacho Tameike
- Location within Japan
- Location: Yamagata Prefecture, Japan
- Coordinates: 38°31′17″N 140°17′21″E
- Opening date: 1990

Dam and spillways
- Height: 20.5 m (67 ft)
- Length: 91.5 m (300 ft)

Reservoir
- Total capacity: 112,000 m^{3} (4,000,000 cu ft)
- Catchment area: sq. km
- Surface area: 2 hectares (4.9 acres)

Senbacho Tameike is an earthfill dam located in Yamagata Prefecture in Japan. The dam is used for irrigation. The catchment area of the dam is km^{2}. The dam impounds about 2 ha of land when full and can store 112 thousand cubic meters of water. The construction of the dam was completed in 1990.
