= Hikiryu No.2 Dam =

Dam in Yamagata Prefecture, Japan

- Location within Japan
- Interactive map of Hikiryu No.2 Dam
- Location: Yamagata Prefecture, Japan
- Coordinates: 38°27′48″N 140°17′39″E
- Opening date: 2002

Dam and spillways
- Height: 25.3 m (83 ft)
- Length: 122 m (400 ft)

Reservoir
- Total capacity: 332 thousand cubic meters
- Catchment area: sq. km
- Surface area: 7 hectares

Hikiryu No.2 Dam is an earthfill dam located in Yamagata Prefecture in Japan. The dam is used for irrigation. The catchment area of the dam is km^{2}. The dam impounds about 7 ha of land when full and can store 332 thousand cubic meters of water. The construction of the dam was completed in 2002.
