= Kijiyama Dam =

Dam in Yamagata Prefecture, Japan

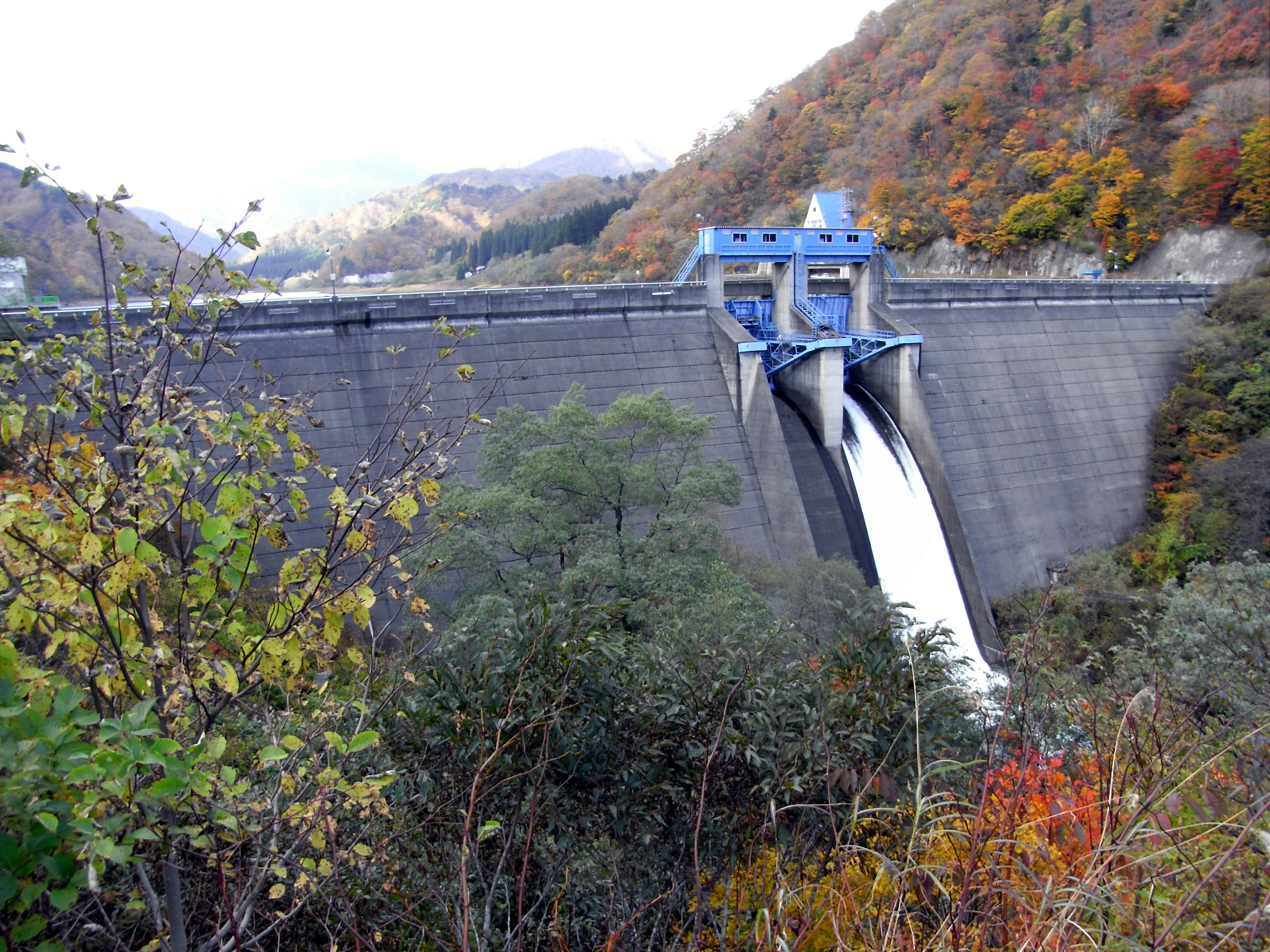

- Location within Japan
- Location: Yamagata Prefecture, Japan
- Coordinates: 38°8′56″N 139°55′18″E
- Construction began: 1957
- Opening date: 1960

Dam and spillways
- Height: 46 m (151 ft)
- Length: 168.2 m (552 ft)

Reservoir
- Total capacity: 8200 thousand cubic meters
- Catchment area: 63 sq. km
- Surface area: 60 hectares

Kijiyama Dam is a hollow gravity dam located in Yamagata Prefecture in Japan. The dam is used for power production. The catchment area of the dam is 63 km^{2}. The dam impounds about 60 ha of land when full and can store 8200 thousand cubic meters of water. The construction of the dam was started on 1957 and completed in 1960.
