= Motosawa Dam =

Dam in Yamagata Prefecture, Japan

- Location within Japan
- Location: Yamagata Prefecture, Japan
- Coordinates: 38°11′18″N 140°14′26″E
- Construction began: 1991
- Opening date: 2004

Dam and spillways
- Height: 17.5 m (57 ft)
- Length: 81.2 m (266 ft)

Reservoir
- Total capacity: 157 thousand cubic meters
- Catchment area: 19.6 sq. km
- Surface area: 2 hectares

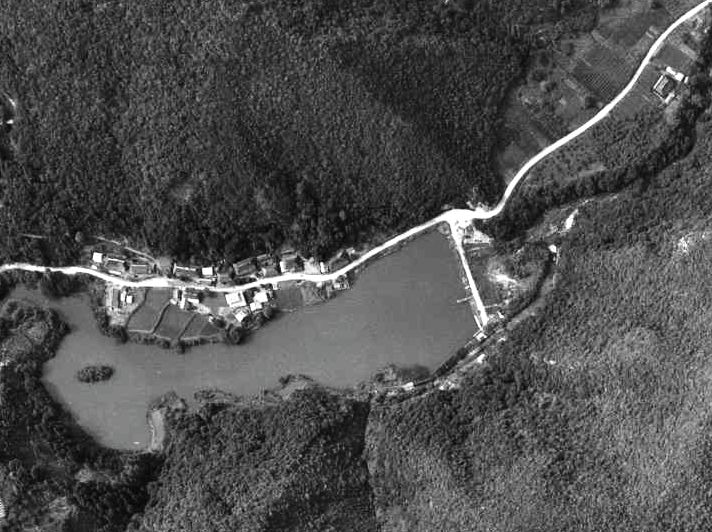
Aerial view of Motosawa Dam

Motosawa Dam is an earthfill dam located in Yamagata Prefecture in Japan. The dam is used for irrigation. The catchment area of the dam is 19.6 km^{2}. The dam impounds about 2 ha of land when full and can store 157 thousand cubic meters of water. The construction of the dam was started on 1991 and completed in 2004.
