= Heita Tameike Dam =

Dam in Yamagata Prefecture, Japan

- Location within Japan
- Interactive map of Heita Tameike Dam
- Location: Yamagata Prefecture, Japan
- Coordinates: 38°27′07″N 140°17′08″E
- Construction began: 1953
- Opening date: 1958

Dam and spillways
- Height: 15.9 m (52 ft)
- Length: 56.9 m (187 ft)

Reservoir
- Total capacity: 80 thousand cubic meters
- Catchment area: 1.7 sq. km
- Surface area: 2 hectares

Heita Tameike Dam is an earthfill dam located in Yamagata Prefecture in Japan. The dam is used for irrigation. The catchment area of the dam is 1.7 km^{2}. The dam impounds about 2 ha of land when full and can store 80 thousand cubic meters of water. The construction of the dam was started on 1953 and completed in 1958.
