= Furomurotsutsumi Dam =

Dam in Yamagata Prefecture, Japan

- Location within Japan
- Interactive map of Furomurotsutsumi Dam
- Location: Yamagata Prefecture, Japan
- Coordinates: 38°2′40″N 139°57′18″E
- Opening date: 1948

Dam and spillways
- Height: 16 m (52 ft)
- Length: 64 m (210 ft)

Reservoir
- Total capacity: 73 thousand cubic meters
- Catchment area: 0.8 sq. km
- Surface area: 4 hectares

Furomurotsutsumi Dam is an earthfill dam located in Yamagata Prefecture in Japan. The dam is used for irrigation. The catchment area of the dam is 0.8 km^{2}. The dam impounds about 4 ha of land when full and can store 73 thousand cubic meters of water. The construction of the dam was completed in 1948.
