= Ochiai Dam (Hokkaido) =

Dam in Hokkaido Prefecture, Japan

- Location within Japan
- Location: Hokkaido Prefecture, Japan
- Coordinates: 43°5′47″N 140°54′12″E
- Construction began: 1987
- Opening date: 2001

Dam and spillways
- Height: 35.3 m (116 ft)
- Length: 199.5 m (655 ft)

Reservoir
- Total capacity: 2,400,000 m^{3} (85,000,000 cu ft)
- Catchment area: 38 km^{2} (15 sq mi)
- Surface area: 31 hectares (77 acres)

Ochiai Dam (Japanese: 落合ダム) is a rockfill dam located in Hokkaido Prefecture in Japan. The dam is used for irrigation. The catchment area of the dam is 38 km^{2}. The dam impounds about 31 ha of land when full and can store 2400 thousand cubic meters of water. The construction of the dam was started on 1987 and completed in 2001.
