= Tateyama Tameike Dam =

Dam in Yamagata Prefecture, Japan

- Location within Japan
- Location: Yamagata Prefecture, Japan
- Coordinates: 38°23′24″N 140°12′47″E
- Opening date: 1950

Dam and spillways
- Height: 18.6 m (61 ft)
- Length: 86 m (282 ft)

Reservoir
- Total capacity: 23,000 m^{3} (810,000 cu ft)
- Catchment area: sq. km
- Surface area: 1 hectare (2.5 acres)

Tateyama Tameike Dam is an earthfill dam located in Yamagata Prefecture in Japan. The dam is used for irrigation. The catchment area of the dam is km^{2}. The dam impounds about 1 ha of land when full and can store 23 thousand cubic meters of water. The construction of the dam was completed in 1950.
