= Kamuro Dam =

Dam in Yamagata Prefecture, Japan

- Location within Japan
- Interactive map of Kamuro Dam
- Location: Yamagata Prefecture, Japan
- Coordinates: 38°54′39″N 140°25′26″E
- Construction began: 1977
- Opening date: 1993

Dam and spillways
- Height: 60.6 m (199 ft)
- Length: 257 m (843 ft)

Reservoir
- Total capacity: 7400 thousand cubic meters
- Catchment area: 22.5 sq. km
- Surface area: 40 hectares

Kamuro Dam is a gravity dam located in Yamagata Prefecture in Japan. The dam is used for flood control and water supply. The catchment area of the dam is 22.5 km^{2}. The dam impounds about 40 ha of land when full and can store 7400 thousand cubic meters of water. The construction of the dam was started on 1977 and completed in 1993.
