= Umagami Tameike Dam =

Dam in Yamagata Prefecture, Japan

- Location within Japan
- Location: Yamagata Prefecture, Japan
- Coordinates: 38°20′36″N 140°8′56″E
- Opening date: 1986

Dam and spillways
- Height: 24.8 m (81 ft)
- Length: 123.2 m (404 ft)

Reservoir
- Total capacity: 1,244,000 m^{3} (43,900,000 cu ft)
- Catchment area: sq. km
- Surface area: 10 hectares (25 acres)

Umagami Tameike Dam is an earthfill dam located in Yamagata Prefecture in Japan. The dam is used for irrigation. The catchment area of the dam is km^{2}. The dam impounds about 10 ha of land when full and can store 1244 thousand cubic meters of water. The construction of the dam was completed in 1986.
