= Shobugawa Dam =

Dam in Yamagata Prefecture, Japan

- Location within Japan
- Location: Yamagata Prefecture, Japan
- Coordinates: 38°6′05″N 140°20′47″E
- Opening date: 1973

Dam and spillways
- Height: 31.1 m (102 ft)
- Length: 210 m (690 ft)

Reservoir
- Total capacity: 545,000 m^{3} (19,200,000 cu ft)
- Catchment area: 11 km^{2} (4.2 sq mi)
- Surface area: 5 hectares (12 acres)

Shobugawa Dam is a gravity concrete & fill dam (compound) dam located in Yamagata Prefecture in Japan. The dam is used for irrigation. The catchment area of the dam is 11 km^{2}. The dam impounds about 5 ha of land when full and can store 545 thousand cubic meters of water. The construction of the dam was completed in 1973.
