= Tachiyazawagawa No.1 Dam =

Dam in Yamagata Prefecture, Japan

- Location within Japan
- Location: Yamagata Prefecture, Japan
- Coordinates: 38°37′27″N 140°2′35″E
- Opening date: 1938

Dam and spillways
- Height: 24 m (79 ft)
- Length: 58.5 m (192 ft)

Reservoir
- Total capacity: 93,000 m^{3} (3,300,000 cu ft)
- Catchment area: 69.7 km^{2} (26.9 sq mi)
- Surface area: 2 hectares (4.9 acres)

Tachiyazawagawa No.1 Dam is a gravity dam located in Yamagata Prefecture in Japan. The dam is used for power production. The catchment area of the dam is 69.7 km^{2}. The dam impounds about 2 ha of land when full and can store 93 thousand cubic meters of water. The construction of the dam was completed in 1938.
