= Gakkogawa Dam =

Dam in Yamagata Prefecture, Japan

- Location within Japan
- Interactive map of Gakkogawa Dam
- Location: Yamagata Prefecture, Japan
- Coordinates: 39°1′40″N 139°59′05″E
- Construction began: 1970
- Opening date: 1978

Dam and spillways
- Height: 48 m (157 ft)
- Length: 205 m (673 ft)

Reservoir
- Total capacity: 1780 thousand cubic meters
- Catchment area: 27.6 sq. km
- Surface area: 15 hectares

Gakkogawa Dam is a gravity concrete & fill dam (compound) dam located in Yamagata Prefecture in Japan. The dam is used for flood control. The catchment area of the dam is 27.6 km^{2}. The dam impounds about 15 ha of land when full and can store 1780 thousand cubic meters of water. The construction of the dam was started on 1970 and completed in 1978.
