= Tsunakigawa Dam =

Dam in Yamagata Prefecture, Japan

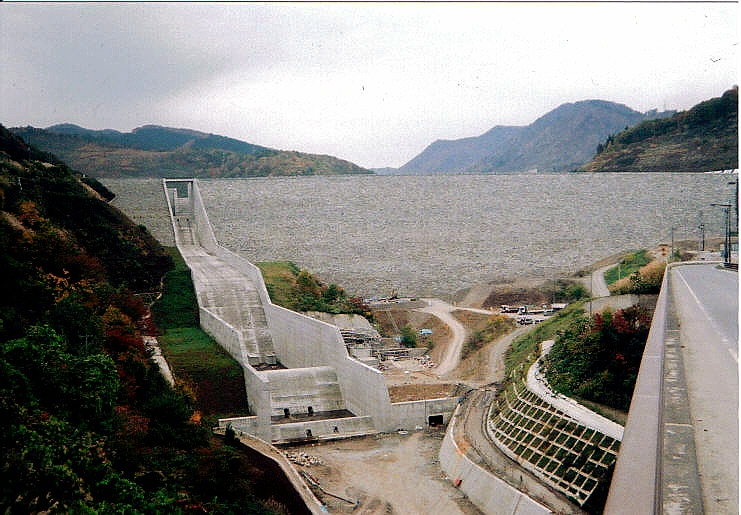
- Location: Yamagata Prefecture, Japan
- Coordinates: 37°50′26″N 140°2′40″E
- Construction began: 1984
- Opening date: 2007

Dam and spillways
- Height: 74m
- Length: 367.5m

Reservoir
- Total capacity: 9550
- Catchment area: 40.5
- Surface area: 49 hectares

Tsunakigawa Dam is a rockfill dam located in Yamagata Prefecture in Japan. The dam is used for flood control and water supply. The catchment area of the dam is 40.5 km^{2}. The dam impounds about 49 ha of land when full and can store 9550 thousand cubic meters of water. The construction of the dam was started on 1984 and completed in 2007.
