= Kamigo Dam =

Dam in Yamagata Prefecture, Japan

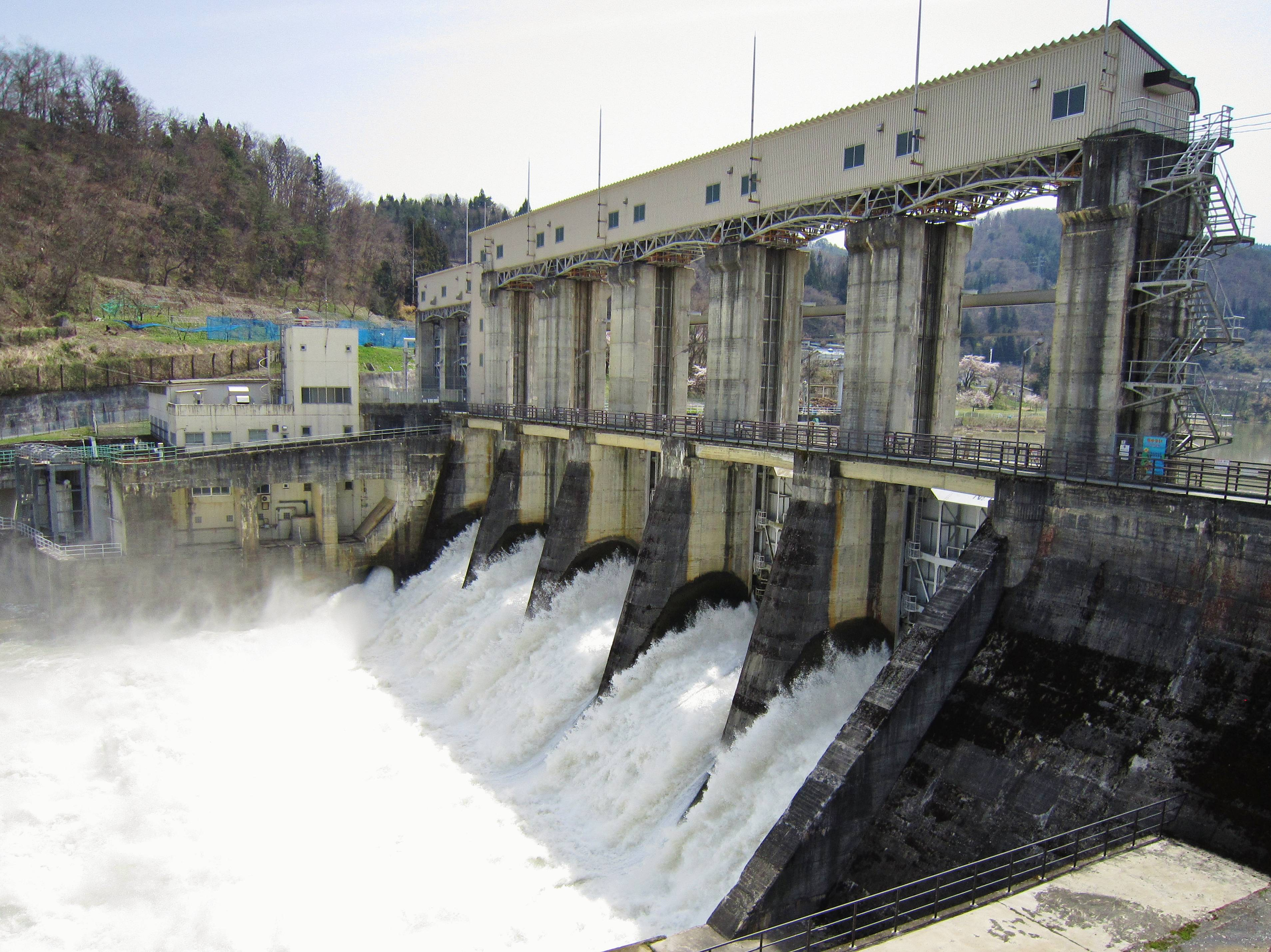
- Location: Yamagata Prefecture, Japan
- Coordinates: 38°17′14″N 140°8′08″E
- Construction began: 1961
- Opening date: 1962

Dam and spillways
- Height: 23.5m
- Length: 166m

Reservoir
- Total capacity: 7660
- Catchment area: 1810
- Surface area: 100 hectares

Kamigo Dam is a concrete gravity dam located in Yamagata Prefecture in Japan. The dam is used for power production. The catchment area of the dam is 1810 km^{2}. The dam impounds about 100 ha of land when full and can store 7660 thousand cubic meters of water. The construction of the dam was started on 1961 and completed in 1962.
