= Zao Dam (Yamagata) =

Dam in Yamagata Prefecture, Japan

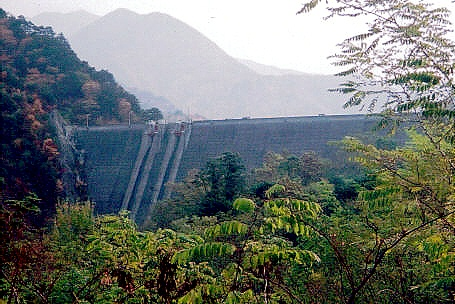

- Location within Japan
- Location: Yamagata Prefecture, Japan
- Coordinates: 38°11′40″N 140°26′25″E
- Construction began: 1965
- Opening date: 1969

Dam and spillways
- Height: 66 m (217 ft)
- Length: 273.8 m (898 ft)

Reservoir
- Total capacity: 7,300,000 m^{3} (260,000,000 cu ft)
- Catchment area: 21 km^{2} (8.1 sq mi)
- Surface area: 24 hectares (59 acres)

Zao Dam is a hollow gravity dam located in Yamagata Prefecture in Japan. The dam is used for flood control and water supply. The catchment area of the dam is 21 km^{2}. The dam impounds about 24 ha of land when full and can store 7300 thousand cubic meters of water. The construction of the dam was started in 1965 and completed in 1969.
