= Bonjigawa Dam =

Dam in Yamagata Prefecture, Japan

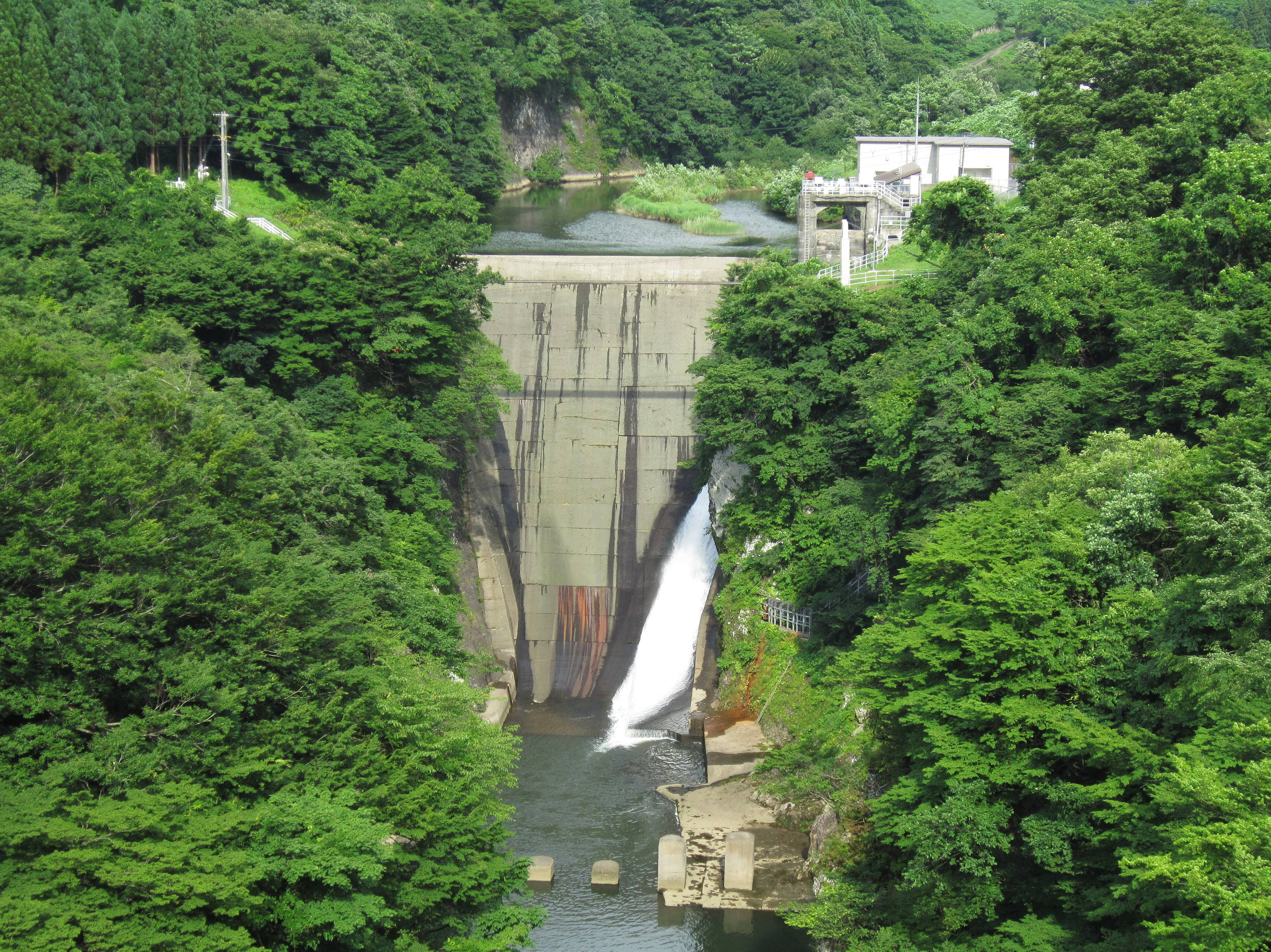

- Location within Japan
- Interactive map of Bonjigawa Dam
- Location: Yamagata Prefecture, Japan
- Coordinates: 38°35′16″N 139°53′17″E
- Construction began: 1932
- Opening date: 1933

Dam and spillways
- Height: 40.9 m (134 ft)
- Length: 62.4 m (205 ft)

Reservoir
- Total capacity: 1274 thousand cubic meters
- Catchment area: 244.8 sq. km
- Surface area: 9 hectares

Bonjigawa Dam is a gravity dam located in Yamagata Prefecture in Japan. The dam is used for power production. The catchment area of the dam is 244.8 km^{2}. The dam impounds about 9 ha of land when full and can store 1274 thousand cubic meters of water. The construction of the dam was started on 1932 and completed in 1933.
