= Akashiba Dam =

Dam in Yamagata Prefecture, Japan

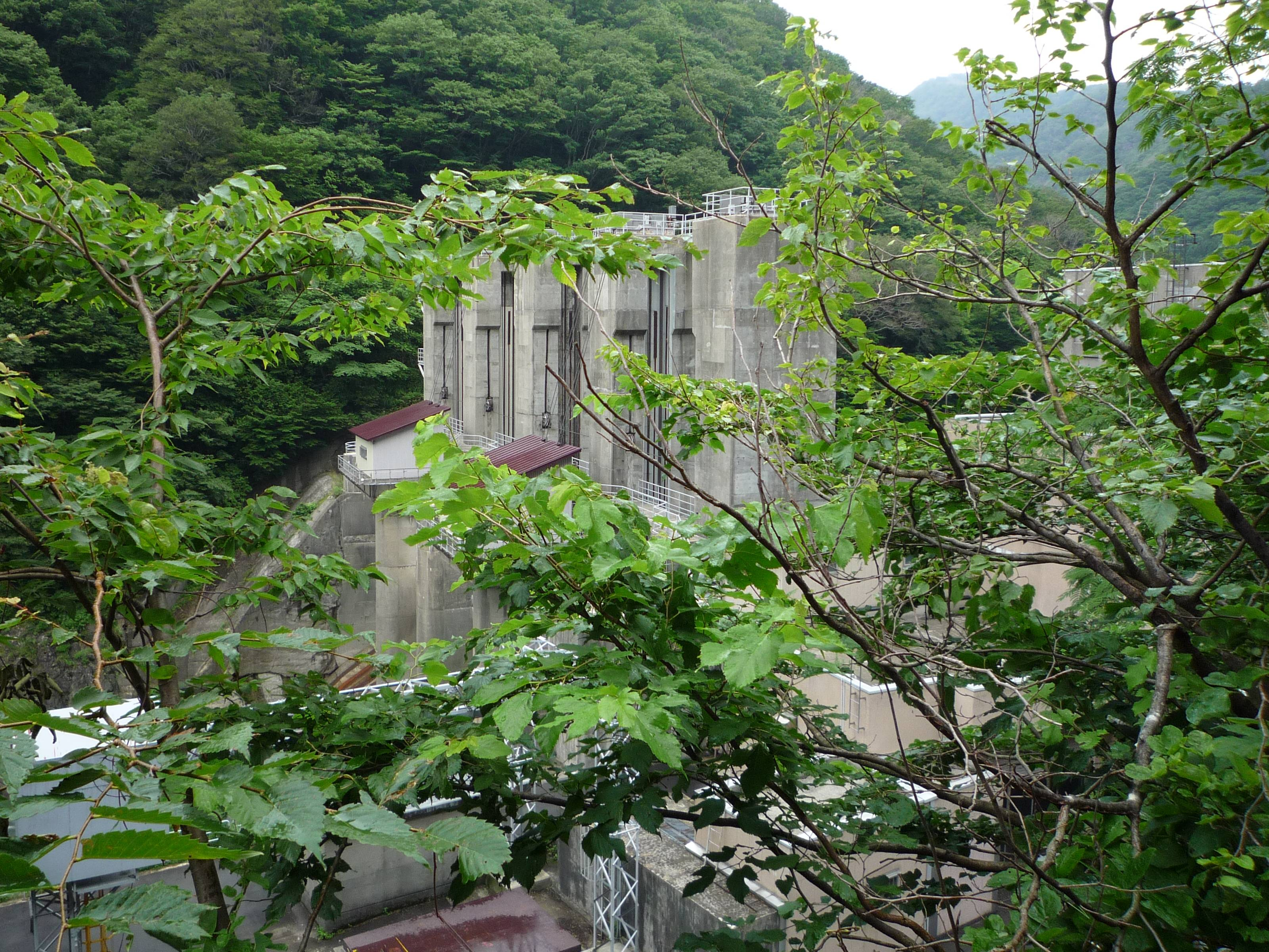

- Location within Japan
- Location: Yamagata Prefecture, Japan
- Coordinates: 38°3′51″N 139°41′29″E
- Opening date: 1954

Dam and spillways
- Height: 31.8 m (104 ft)
- Length: 57.3 m (188 ft)

Reservoir
- Total capacity: 2078 thousand cubic meters
- Catchment area: 736.8 sq. km
- Surface area: 23 hectares

Akashiba Dam is a gravity dam located in Yamagata Prefecture in Japan. The dam is used for power production. The catchment area of the dam is 736.8 km^{2}. The dam impounds about 23 ha of land when full and can store 2078 thousand cubic meters of water. The construction of the dam was completed in 1954.
