= Ochiai Dam (Yamagata) =

Dam in Yamagata Prefecture, Japan

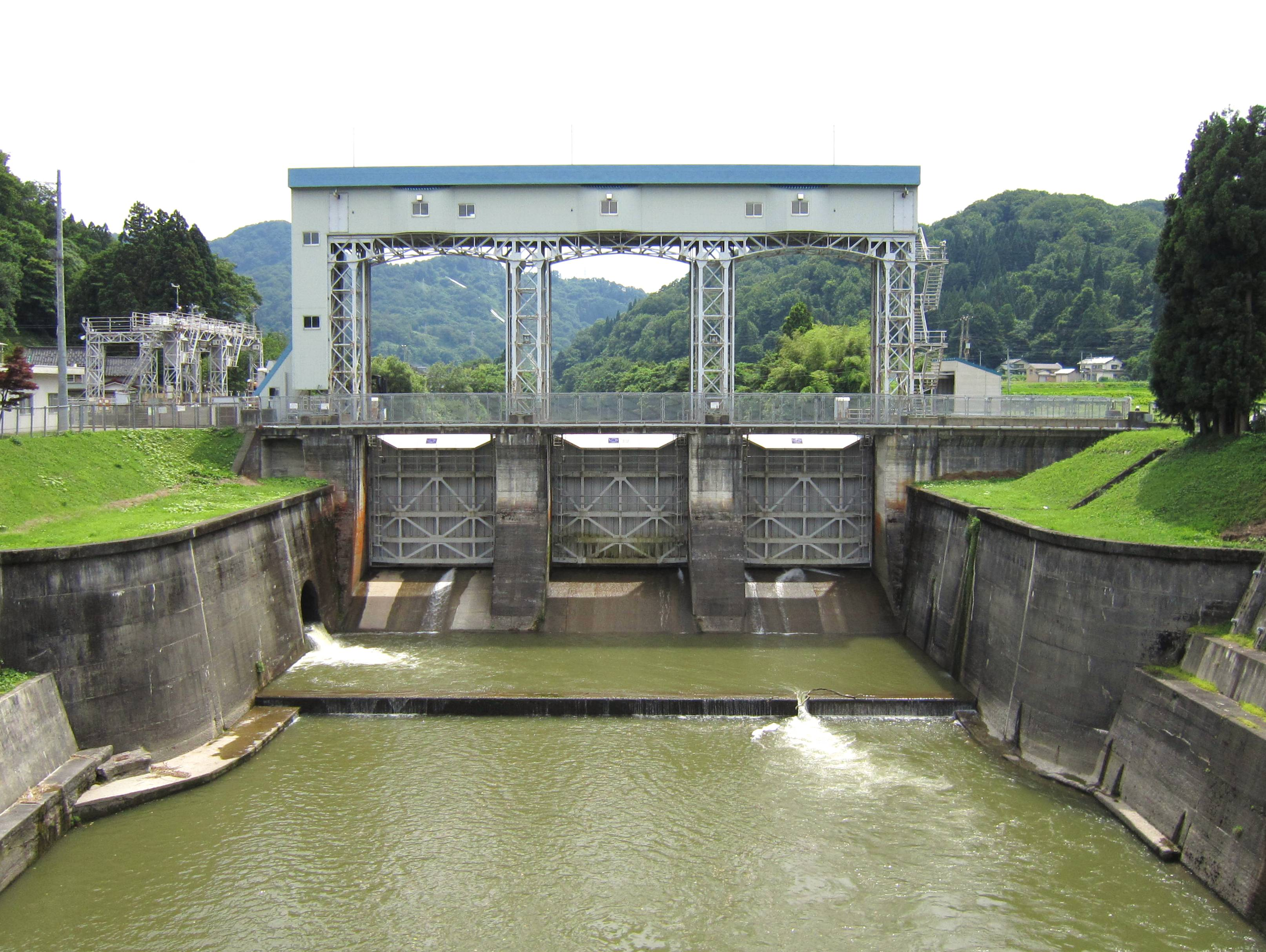

- Location within Japan
- Location: Yamagata Prefecture, Japan
- Coordinates: 38°33′16″N 139°48′38″E
- Opening date: 1958

Dam and spillways
- Height: 15.5 m (51 ft)
- Length: 63 m (207 ft)

Reservoir
- Total capacity: 656,000 m^{3} (23,200,000 cu ft)
- Catchment area: 371.5 km^{2} (143.4 sq mi)
- Surface area: 9 hectares (22 acres)

Ochiai Dam is a gravity dam located in Yamagata Prefecture in Japan. The dam is used for power production. The catchment area of the dam is 371.5 km^{2}. The dam impounds about 9 ha of land when full and can store 656 thousand cubic meters of water. The construction of the dam was completed in 1958.
