= Atsumigawa Dam =

Dam in Yamagata Prefecture, Japan

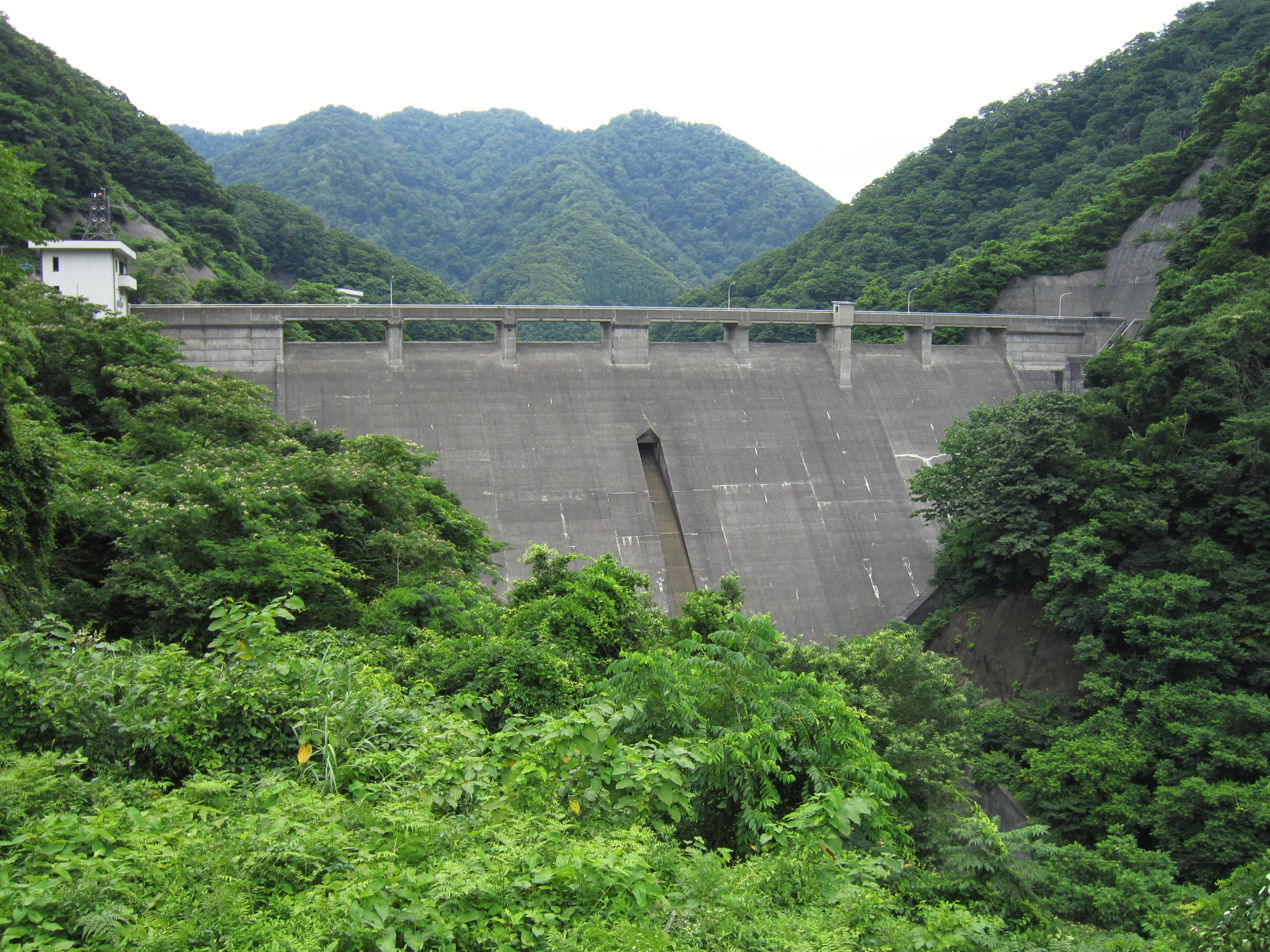
- Location: Yamagata Prefecture, Japan
- Coordinates: 38°35′35″N 139°40′11″E
- Construction began: 1973
- Opening date: 1986

Dam and spillways
- Height: 60m
- Length: 167m

Reservoir
- Total capacity: 5700
- Catchment area: 31.6
- Surface area: 390 hectares

Atsumigawa Dam is a gravity dam located in Yamagata Prefecture in Japan. The dam is used for flood control and power production. The catchment area of the dam is 31.6 km^{2}. The dam impounds about 390 ha of land when full and can store 5700 thousand cubic meters of water. The construction of the dam was started on 1973 and completed in 1986.
