= Takasaka Dam =

Dam in Yamagata Prefecture, Japan

- Location within Japan
- Location: Yamagata Prefecture, Japan
- Coordinates: 38°58′06″N 140°9′48″E
- Construction began: 1962
- Opening date: 1967

Dam and spillways
- Height: 57 m (187 ft)
- Length: 118.7 m (389 ft)

Reservoir
- Total capacity: 19,050,000 m^{3} (673,000,000 cu ft)
- Catchment area: 68.2 km^{2} (26.3 sq mi)
- Surface area: 110 hectares (270 acres)

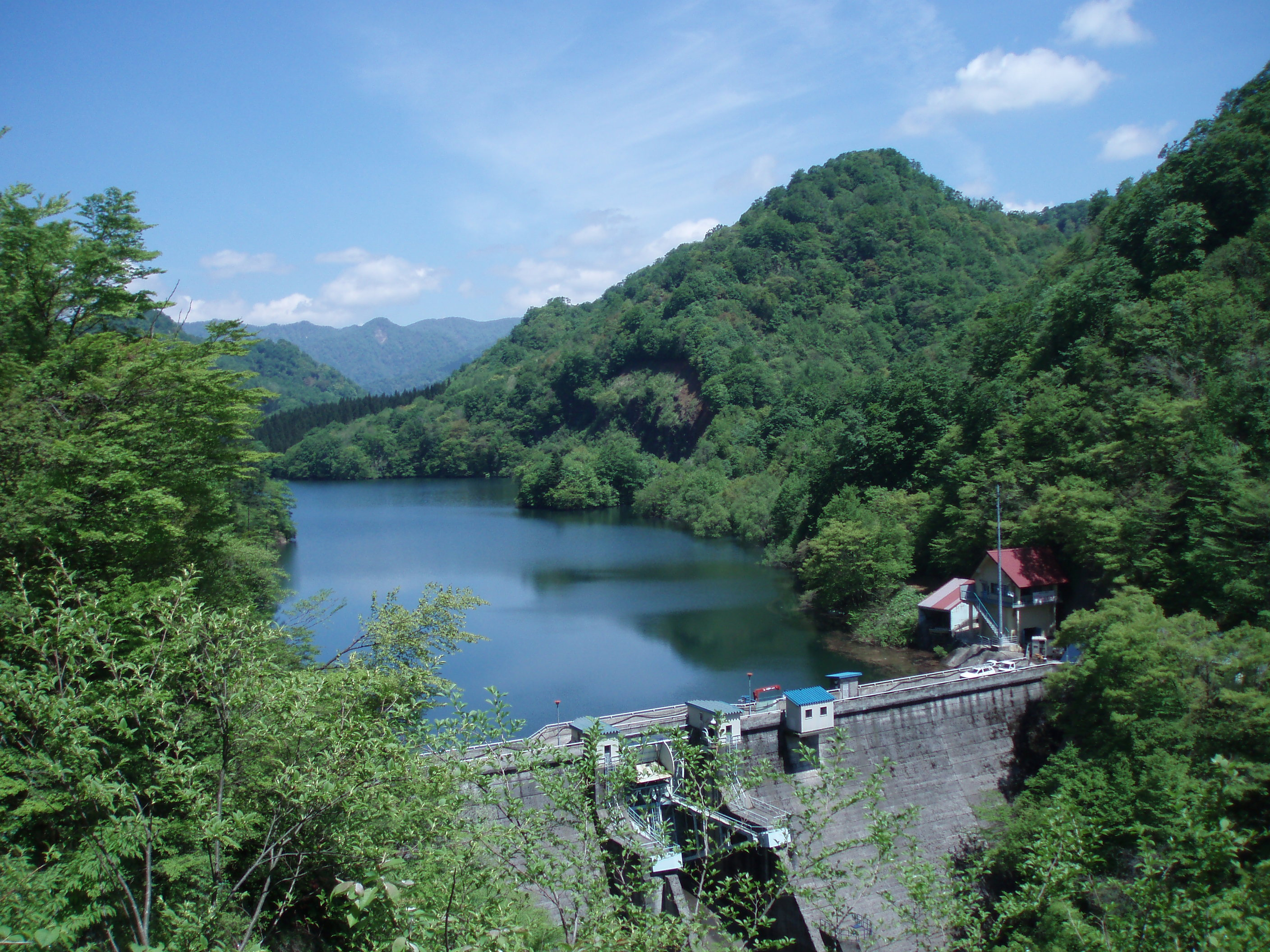
Takasaka dam in 2007

Takasaka Dam is a gravity dam located in Yamagata Prefecture in Japan. The dam is used for flood control and power production. The catchment area of the dam is 68.2 km^{2}. The dam impounds about 110 ha of land when full and can store 19050 thousand cubic meters of water. The construction of the dam was started on 1962 and completed in 1967.
