= Shiromizu Dam =

Dam in Yamagata Prefecture, Japan

- Location within Japan
- Location: Yamagata Prefecture, Japan
- Coordinates: 38°26′55″N 140°28′30″E
- Construction began: 1974
- Opening date: 1990

Dam and spillways
- Height: 54.5 m (179 ft)
- Length: 367 m (1,204 ft)

Reservoir
- Total capacity: 5,300,000 m^{3} (190,000,000 cu ft)
- Catchment area: 15.2 km^{2} (5.9 sq mi)
- Surface area: 30 hectares (74 acres)

Shiromizu Dam is a gravity dam located in Yamagata Prefecture in Japan. The dam is used for flood control and irrigation. The catchment area of the dam is 15.2 km^{2}. The dam impounds about 30 ha of land when full and can store 5300 thousand cubic meters of water. The construction of the dam was started on 1974 and completed in 1990.
