= Koyamagasawa Tameike Dam =

Dam in Yamagata Prefecture, Japan

Koyamagasawa Tameike
- Location within Japan
- Location: Yamagata Prefecture, Japan
- Coordinates: 38°33′37″N 140°21′10″E
- Opening date: 2000

Dam and spillways
- Height: 17.5 m (57 ft)
- Length: 157.3 m (516 ft)

Reservoir
- Total capacity: 325 thousand cubic meters
- Catchment area: sq. km
- Surface area: 5 hectares

Koyamagasawa Tameike is an earthfill dam located in Yamagata Prefecture in Japan. The dam is used for irrigation. The catchment area of the dam is km^{2}. The dam impounds about 5 ha of land when full and can store 325 thousand cubic meters of water. The construction of the dam was completed in 2000.
