= Maekawa Dam =

Dam in Yamagata Prefecture, Japan

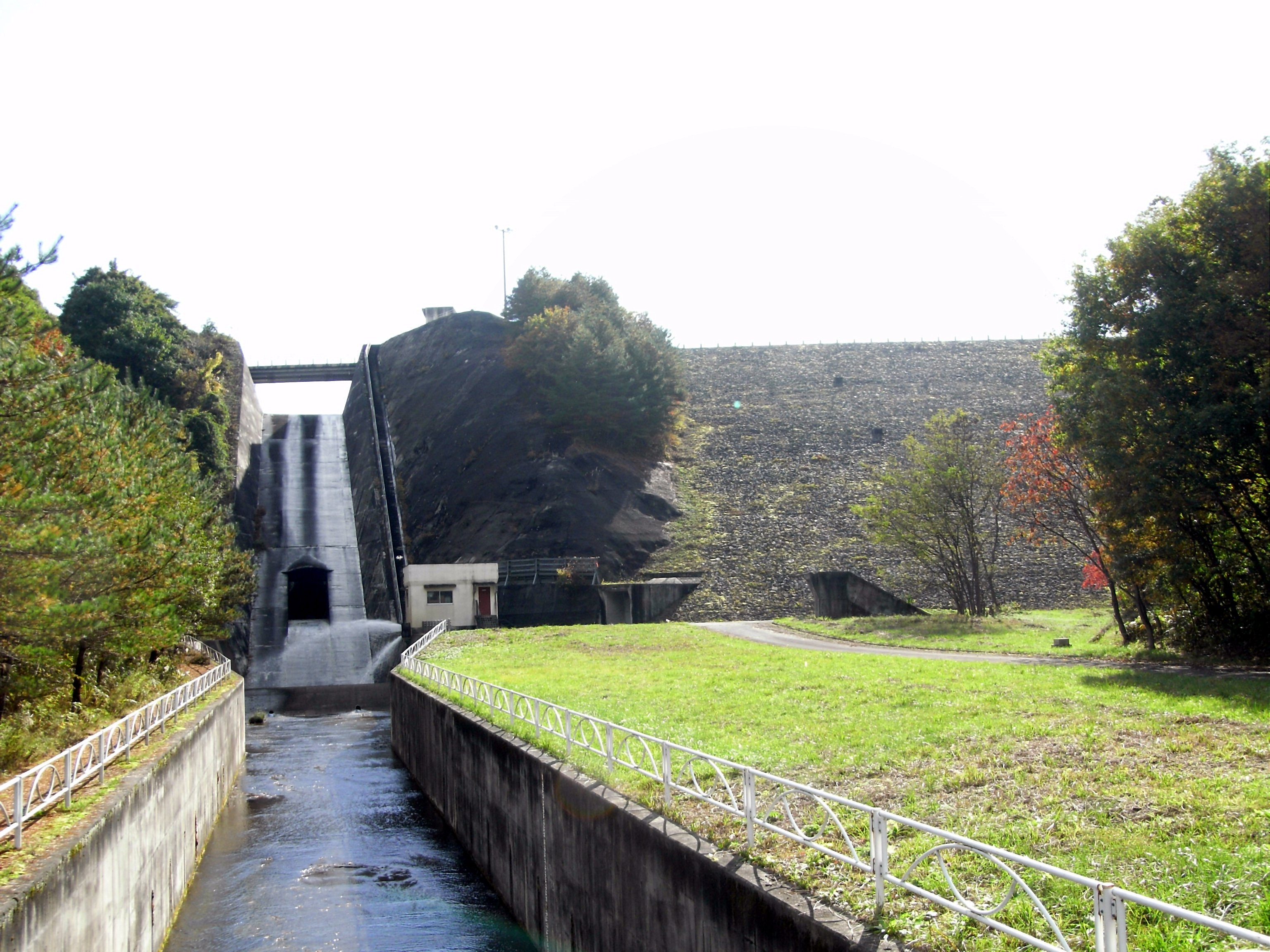

- Location within Japan
- Location: Yamagata Prefecture, Japan
- Coordinates: 38°7′28″N 140°13′58″E
- Construction began: 1971
- Opening date: 1982

Dam and spillways
- Height: 50 m (160 ft)
- Length: 265.5 m (871 ft)

Reservoir
- Total capacity: 4400 thousand cubic meters
- Catchment area: 21.2 sq. km
- Surface area: 35 hectares

Maekawa Dam is a rockfill dam located in Yamagata Prefecture in Japan. The dam is used for flood control. The catchment area of the dam is 21.2 km^{2}. The dam impounds about 35 ha of land when full and can store 4400 thousand cubic meters of water. The construction of the dam was started on 1971 and completed in 1982.
