= Yakuwa Dam =

Dam in Yamagata Prefecture, Japan

- Interactive map of Yakuwa Dam
- Location: Yamagata Prefecture, Japan
- Coordinates: 38°30′43″N 139°52′30″E
- Opening date: 1957

Dam and spillways
- Height: 97.5m
- Length: 269m

Reservoir
- Total capacity: 49028
- Catchment area: 148.4
- Surface area: 186 hectares

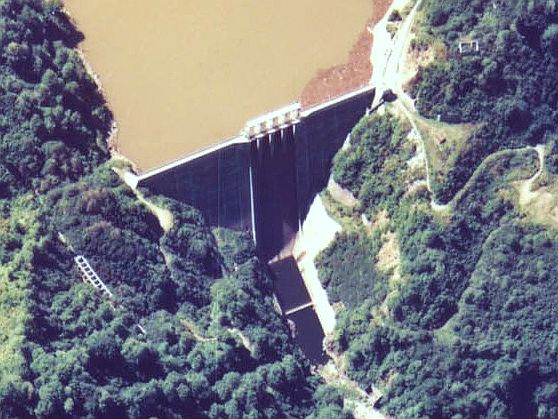
Yakuwa Dam.

Yakuwa Dam is a gravity dam located in Yamagata Prefecture in Japan. The dam is used for power production. The catchment area of the dam is 148.4 km^{2}. The dam impounds about 186 ha of land when full and can store 49028 thousand cubic meters of water. The construction of the dam was started on and completed in 1957.
