= Matsuzawa Tameike Dam =

Dam in Yamagata Prefecture, Japan

Matsuzawa Tameike
- Location within Japan
- Location: Yamagata Prefecture, Japan
- Coordinates: 38°6′03″N 140°16′43″E
- Opening date: 1920

Dam and spillways
- Height: 21 m (69 ft)
- Length: 209 m (686 ft)

Reservoir
- Total capacity: 294 thousand cubic meters
- Catchment area: sq. km
- Surface area: 5 hectares

Matsuzawa Tameike is an earthfill dam located in Yamagata Prefecture in Japan. The dam is used for irrigation. The catchment area of the dam is km^{2}. The dam impounds about 5 ha of land when full and can store 294 thousand cubic meters of water. The construction of the dam was completed in 1920.
