= Tomeyamagawa Dam =

Dam in Yamagata Prefecture, Japan

- Location within Japan
- Location: Yamagata Prefecture, Japan
- Coordinates: 38°21′30″N 140°27′13″E
- Construction began: 1990
- Opening date: 2011

Dam and spillways
- Height: 46 m (151 ft)
- Length: 115 m (377 ft)

Reservoir
- Total capacity: 1,120,000 m^{3} (40,000,000 cu ft)
- Catchment area: 7.2 km^{2} (2.8 sq mi)
- Surface area: 9 hectares (22 acres)

Tomeyamagawa Dam is a gravity dam located in Yamagata Prefecture, Japan. It serves primarily for flood control. The dam's catchment area covers 7.2 km^{2} and, when full, it impounds about 9 ha of land. It can store 1120 thousand cubic meters of water. The construction of the dam started in 1990 and was completed in 2011.
