= Ginzangawa Dam =

Dam in Yamagata Prefecture, Japan

- Location within Japan
- Interactive map of Ginzangawa Dam
- Location: Yamagata Prefecture, Japan
- Coordinates: 38°34′28″N 140°31′28″E
- Opening date: 1963

Dam and spillways
- Height: 21.3 m (70 ft)
- Length: 60 m (200 ft)

Reservoir
- Total capacity: 263 thousand cubic meters
- Catchment area: sq. km
- Surface area: 6 hectares

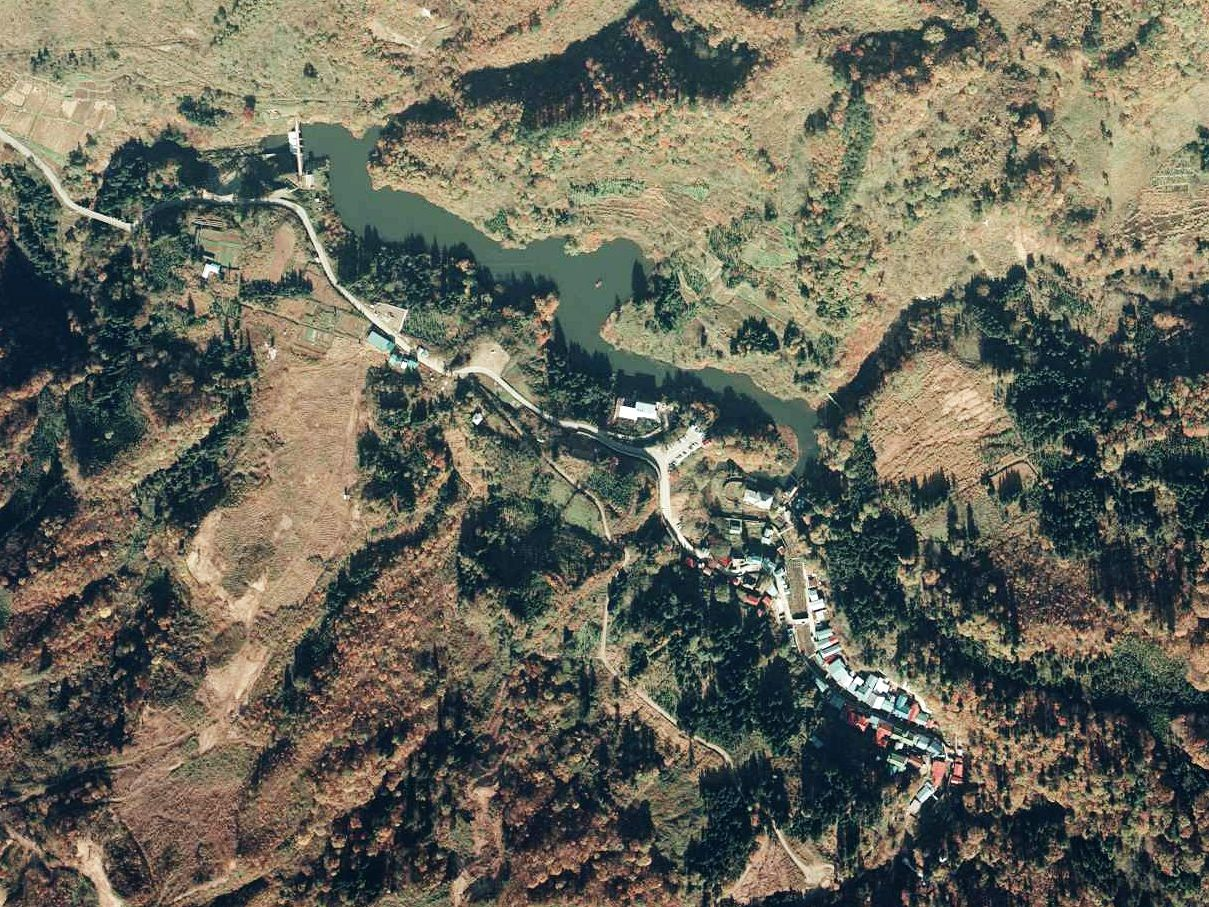

Ginzangawa Dam is a gravity dam located in Yamagata Prefecture in Japan. The dam is used for flood control. The catchment area of the dam is km^{2}. The dam impounds about 6 ha of land when full and can store 263 thousand cubic meters of water. The construction of the dam was completed in 1963.
