= Mitsumata Dam =

Dam in Yamagata Prefecture, Japan

- Location within Japan
- Location: Yamagata Prefecture, Japan
- Coordinates: 38°39′14″N 139°58′59″E
- Construction began: 1968
- Opening date: 1977

Dam and spillways
- Height: 24 m (79 ft)
- Length: 97 m (318 ft)

Reservoir
- Total capacity: 142 thousand cubic meters
- Catchment area: 5.5 sq. km
- Surface area: hectares

Mitsumata Dam is an earthfill dam located in Yamagata Prefecture in Japan. The dam is used for irrigation. The catchment area of the dam is 5.5 km^{2}. The dam impounds about ha of land when full and can store 142 thousand cubic meters of water. The construction of the dam was started on 1968 and completed in 1977.
