= Koiragawa Dam =

Dam in Yamagata Prefecture, Japan

- Location within Japan
- Location: Yamagata Prefecture, Japan
- Coordinates: 38°49′16″N 140°22′45″E
- Construction began: 1963
- Opening date: 1965

Dam and spillways
- Height: 21.9 m (72 ft)
- Length: 67 m (220 ft)

Reservoir
- Total capacity: 358 thousand cubic meters
- Catchment area: 4.1 sq. km
- Surface area: 5 hectares

Koiragawa Dam is an earthfill dam located in Yamagata Prefecture in Japan. The dam is used for irrigation. The catchment area of the dam is 4.1 km^{2}. The dam impounds about 5 ha of land when full and can store 358 thousand cubic meters of water. The construction of the dam was started on 1963 and completed in 1965.
