= Ichinosawa Dam =

Dam in Yamagata Prefecture, Japan

- Location within Japan
- Interactive map of Ichinosawa Dam
- Location: Yamagata Prefecture, Japan
- Coordinates: 38°27′33″N 140°26′54″E
- Opening date: 1998

Dam and spillways
- Height: 26.5 m (87 ft)
- Length: 128 m (420 ft)

Reservoir
- Total capacity: 320 thousand cubic meters
- Catchment area: sq. km
- Surface area: 7 hectares

Ichinosawa Dam is a rockfill dam located in Yamagata Prefecture in Japan. The dam is used for irrigation. The catchment area of the dam is km^{2}. The dam impounds about 7 ha of land when full and can store 320 thousand cubic meters of water. The construction of the dam was completed in 1998.
