= Sagae Dam =

Dam in Yamagata Prefecture, Japan

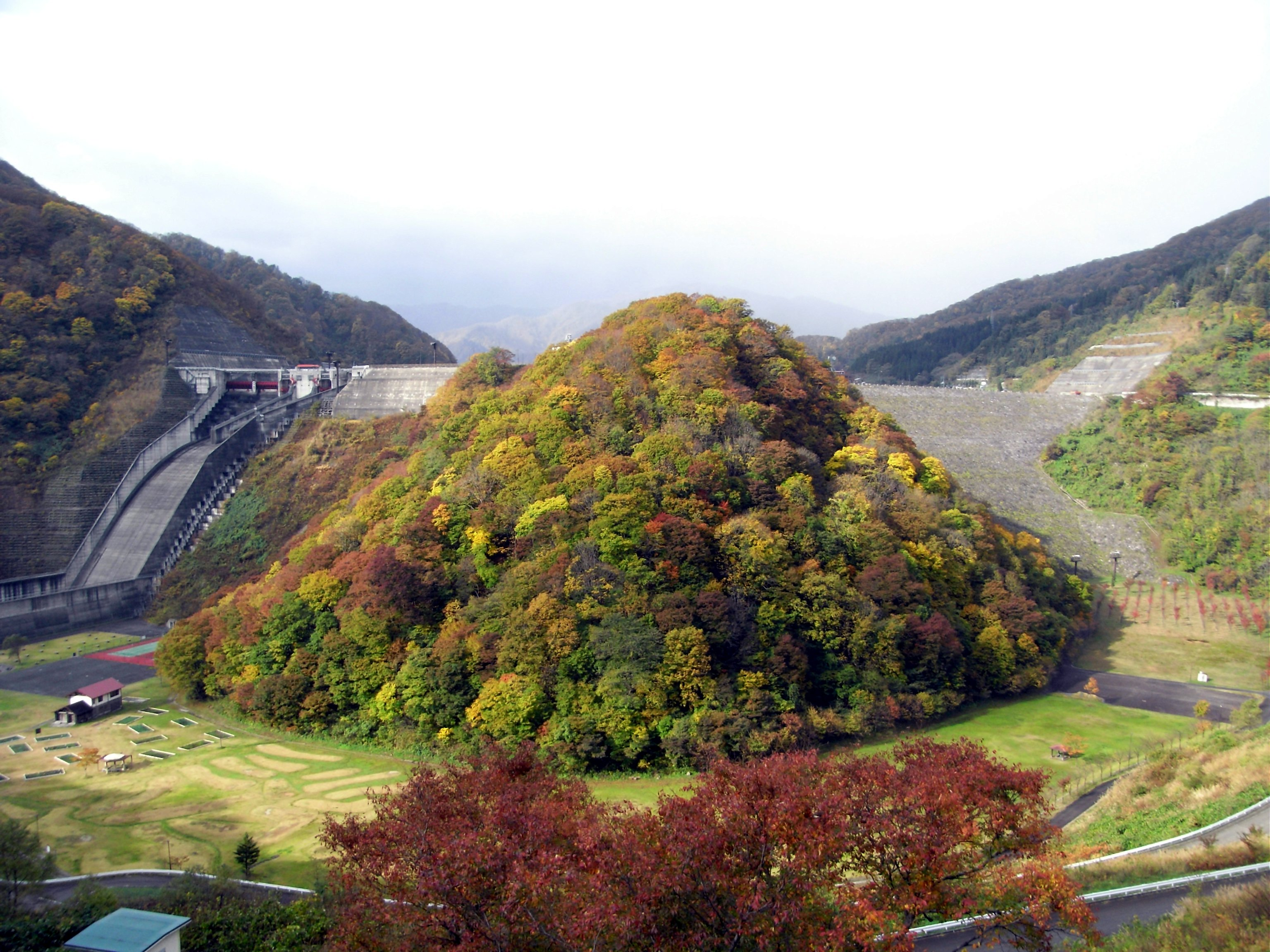
- Interactive map of Sagae Dam
- Location: Yamagata Prefecture, Japan
- Coordinates: 38°27′19″N 140°2′18″E
- Construction began: 1972
- Opening date: 1990

Dam and spillways
- Height: 112m
- Length: 510m

Reservoir
- Total capacity: 109000
- Catchment area: 231
- Surface area: 340 hectares

Sagae Dam is a rockfill dam located in Yamagata Prefecture in Japan. The dam is used for flood control, water supply and power production. The catchment area of the dam is 231 km^{2}. The dam impounds about 340 ha of land when full and can store 109000 thousand cubic meters of water. The construction of the dam was started on 1972 and completed in 1990.
