= Domisawa Tameike Dam =

Dam in Yamagata Prefecture, Japan

Domisawa Tameike
- Location within Japan
- Interactive map of Domisawa Tameike
- Location: Yamagata Prefecture, Japan
- Coordinates: 38°56′56″N 140°0′14″E
- Opening date: 1929

Dam and spillways
- Height: 19.5 m (64 ft)
- Length: 145 m (476 ft)

Reservoir
- Total capacity: 300 thousand cubic meters
- Catchment area: sq. km
- Surface area: 1 hectares

Domisawa Tameike is an earthfill dam located in Yamagata Prefecture in Japan. The dam is used for irrigation. The catchment area of the dam is km^{2}. The dam impounds about 1 ha of land when full and can store 300 thousand cubic meters of water. The construction of the dam was completed in 1929.
