= Nagai Dam =

Dam in Yamagata Prefecture, Japan

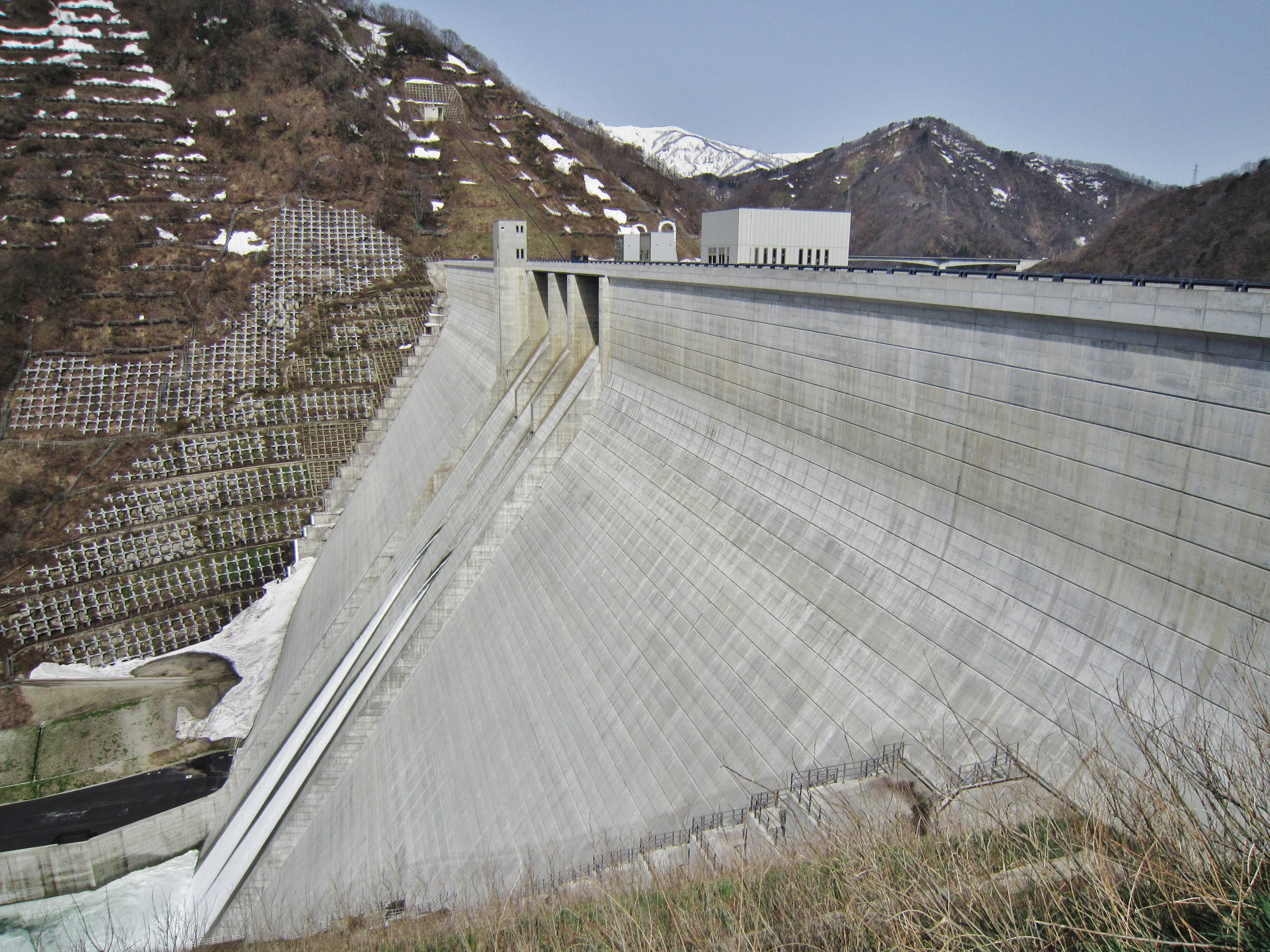
- Location: Yamagata Prefecture, Japan
- Coordinates: 38°6′03″N 139°57′26″E
- Construction began: 1979
- Opening date: 2010

Dam and spillways
- Height: 125.5m
- Length: 381m

Reservoir
- Total capacity: 51000
- Catchment area: 101.2
- Surface area: 140 hectares

Nagai Dam (japanese: 長井ダム) is a concrete gravity dam located in Yamagata Prefecture in Japan. The dam is used for flood control, water supply and power generation. The catchment area of the dam is 101.2 square kilometres (39.1 sq mi). The dam impounds about 140 ha of land when full and can store 51000 thousand cubic meters of water. The construction of the dam was started in 1979 and completed in 2010.
