= Arasawa Dam =

Dam in Yamagata Prefecture, Japan

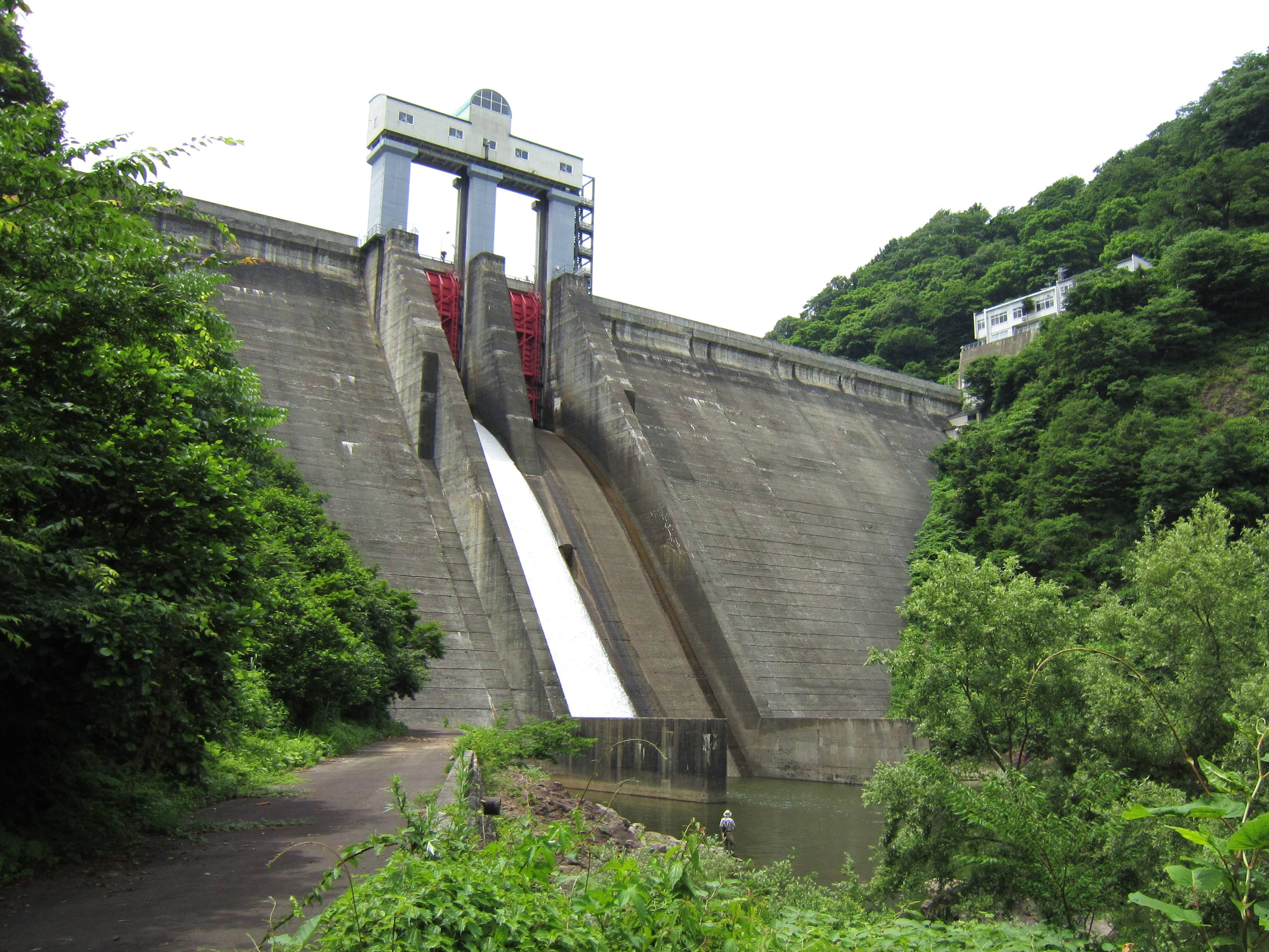
- Location: Yamagata Prefecture, Japan
- Coordinates: 38°30′26″N 139°46′59″E
- Construction began: 1949
- Opening date: 1955

Dam and spillways
- Height: 63m
- Length: 195.5m

Reservoir
- Total capacity: 41420
- Catchment area: 162
- Surface area: 189 hectares

Arasawa Dam is a concrete gravity dam located in Yamagata Prefecture in Japan. The dam is used for flood control and power generation. The catchment area of the dam is 162 km^{2}. The dam impounds about 189 ha of land when full and can store 41420 thousand cubic meters of water. The construction of the dam was started on 1949 and completed in 1955.
