= Shirakawa Dam (Yamagata) =

Dam in Yamagata Prefecture, Japan

- Interactive map of Shirakawa Dam
- Location: Yamagata Prefecture, Japan
- Coordinates: 37°58′22″N 139°55′22″E
- Construction began: 1968
- Opening date: 1981

Dam and spillways
- Height: 66m
- Length: 348.2m

Reservoir
- Total capacity: 50000
- Catchment area: 205
- Surface area: 270 hectares

Shirakawa Dam is a rockfill dam located in Yamagata Prefecture in Japan. The dam is used for flood control, irrigation, water supply and power production. The catchment area of the dam is 205 km^{2}. The dam impounds about 270 ha of land when full and can store 50000 thousand cubic meters of water. The construction of the dam was started on 1968 and completed in 1981.
