= Gassan Dam =

Dam in Yamagata Prefecture, Japan

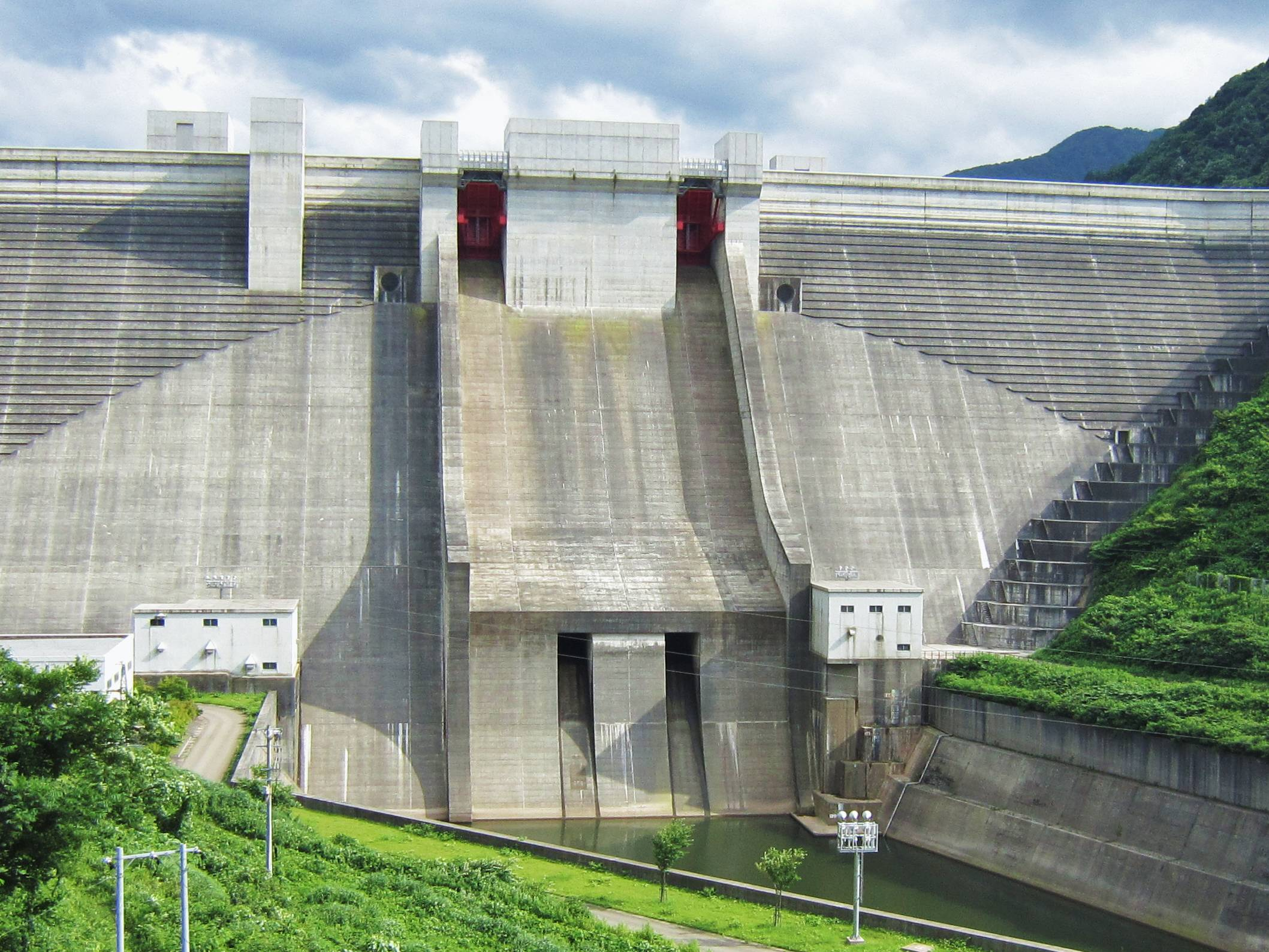
- Location: Yamagata Prefecture, Japan
- Coordinates: 38°35′00″N 139°53′44″E
- Construction began: 1976
- Opening date: 2001

Dam and spillways
- Height: 123m
- Length: 393m

Reservoir
- Total capacity: 65000
- Catchment area: 239.8
- Surface area: 180 hectares

Gassan Dam is a concrete gravity dam located in Yamagata Prefecture in Japan. The dam is used for flood control, water supply and power production. The catchment area of the dam is 239.8 km^{2}. The dam impounds about 180 ha of land when full and can store 65000 thousand cubic meters of water. The construction of the dam was started on 1976 and completed in 2001.
