= Fushikuma Dam =

Dam in Yamagata Prefecture, Japan

- Location within Japan
- Interactive map of Fushikuma Dam
- Location: Yamagata Prefecture, Japan
- Coordinates: 38°21′24″N 140°13′13″E
- Opening date: 1945

Dam and spillways
- Height: 17.5 m (57 ft)
- Length: 96 m (315 ft)

Reservoir
- Total capacity: 148 thousand cubic meters
- Catchment area: 0.5 sq. km
- Surface area: 2 hectares

Fushikuma Dam is an earthfill dam located in Yamagata Prefecture in Japan. The dam is used for irrigation. The catchment area of the dam is 0.5 km^{2}. The dam impounds about 2 ha of land when full and can store 148 thousand cubic meters of water. The construction of the dam was completed in 1945.
