= Namaigawa Dam =

Dam in Yamagata Prefecture, Japan

- Location within Japan
- Location: Yamagata Prefecture, Japan
- Coordinates: 38°7′10″N 140°19′45″E
- Construction began: 1979
- Opening date: 1992

Dam and spillways
- Height: 47.8 m (157 ft)
- Length: 313.7 m (1,029 ft)

Reservoir
- Total capacity: 2650 thousand cubic meters
- Catchment area: 10.8 sq. km
- Surface area: 22 hectares

Namaigawa Dam is a rockfill dam located in Yamagata Prefecture in Japan. The dam is used for irrigation. The catchment area of the dam is 10.8 km^{2}. The dam impounds about 22 ha of land when full and can store 2650 thousand cubic meters of water. The construction of the dam was started on 1979 and completed in 1992.
