= Shintsuruko Dam =

Dam in Yamagata Prefecture, Japan

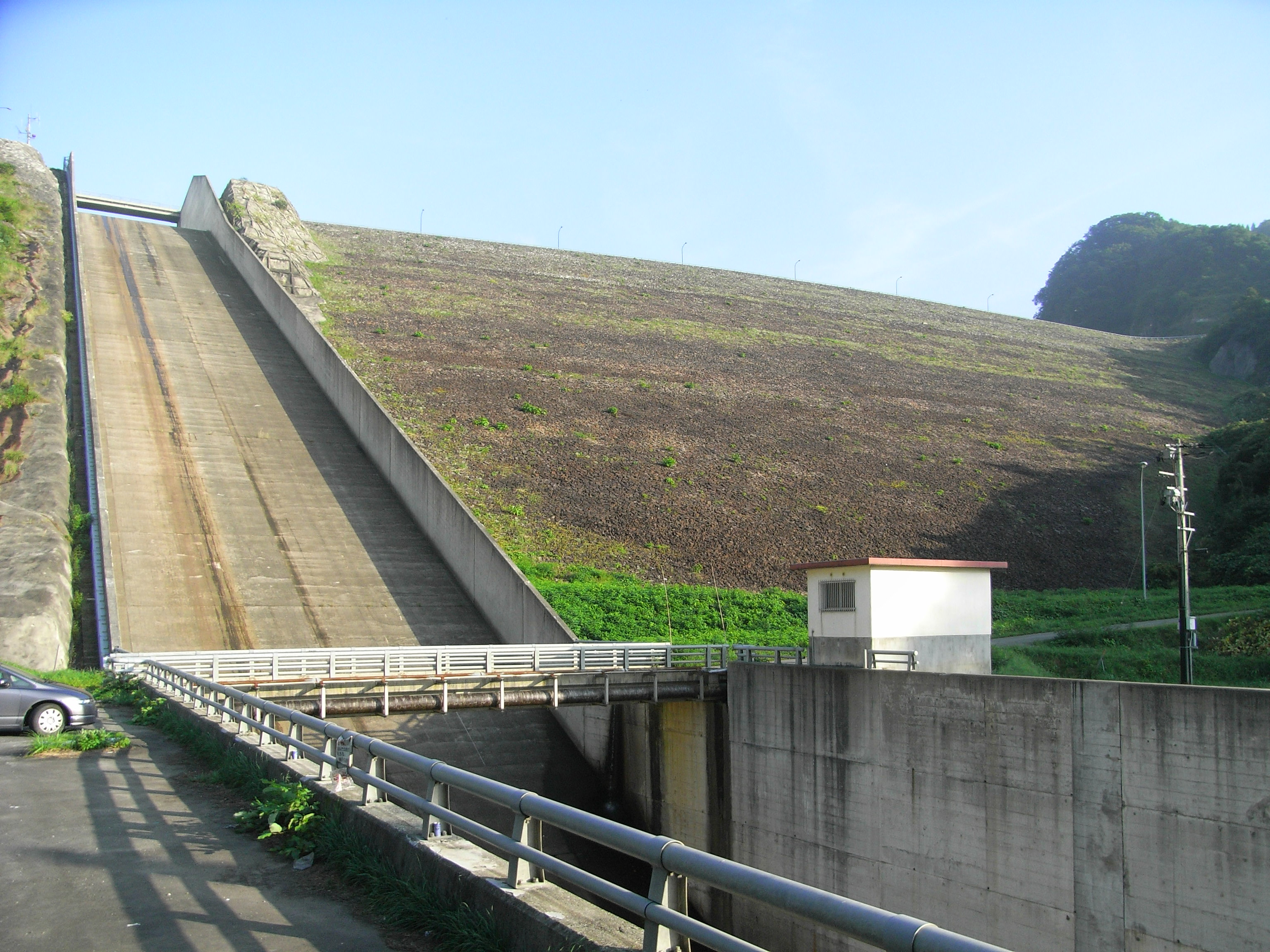
- Location: Yamagata Prefecture, Japan
- Coordinates: 38°31′57″N 140°31′10″E
- Construction began: 1972
- Opening date: 1990

Dam and spillways
- Height: 96m
- Length: 283.9m

Reservoir
- Total capacity: 31500
- Catchment area: 56
- Surface area: 125 hectares

Shintsuruko Dam is a rockfill dam located in Yamagata Prefecture in Japan. The dam is used for agriculture purposes. The catchment area of the dam is 56 km^{2}. The dam impounds about 125 ha of land when full and can store 31,500 thousand cubic meters of water. The construction of the dam was started on 1972 and completed in 1990.
