= Tonosawa Dam =

Dam in Yamagata Prefecture, Japan

- Location within Japan
- Location: Yamagata Prefecture, Japan
- Coordinates: 38°28′24″N 140°17′31″E
- Opening date: 1988

Dam and spillways
- Height: 18 m (59 ft)
- Length: 90 m (300 ft)

Reservoir
- Total capacity: 67,000 m^{3} (2,400,000 cu ft)
- Catchment area: sq. km
- Surface area: 1 hectare (2.5 acres)

Tonosawa Dam is an earthfill dam located in Yamagata Prefecture in Japan. The dam is used for irrigation. The catchment area of the dam is km^{2}. The dam impounds about 1 ha of land when full and can store 67 thousand cubic meters of water. The construction of the dam was completed in 1988.
