= Mizukubo Dam =

Dam in Yamagata Prefecture, Japan

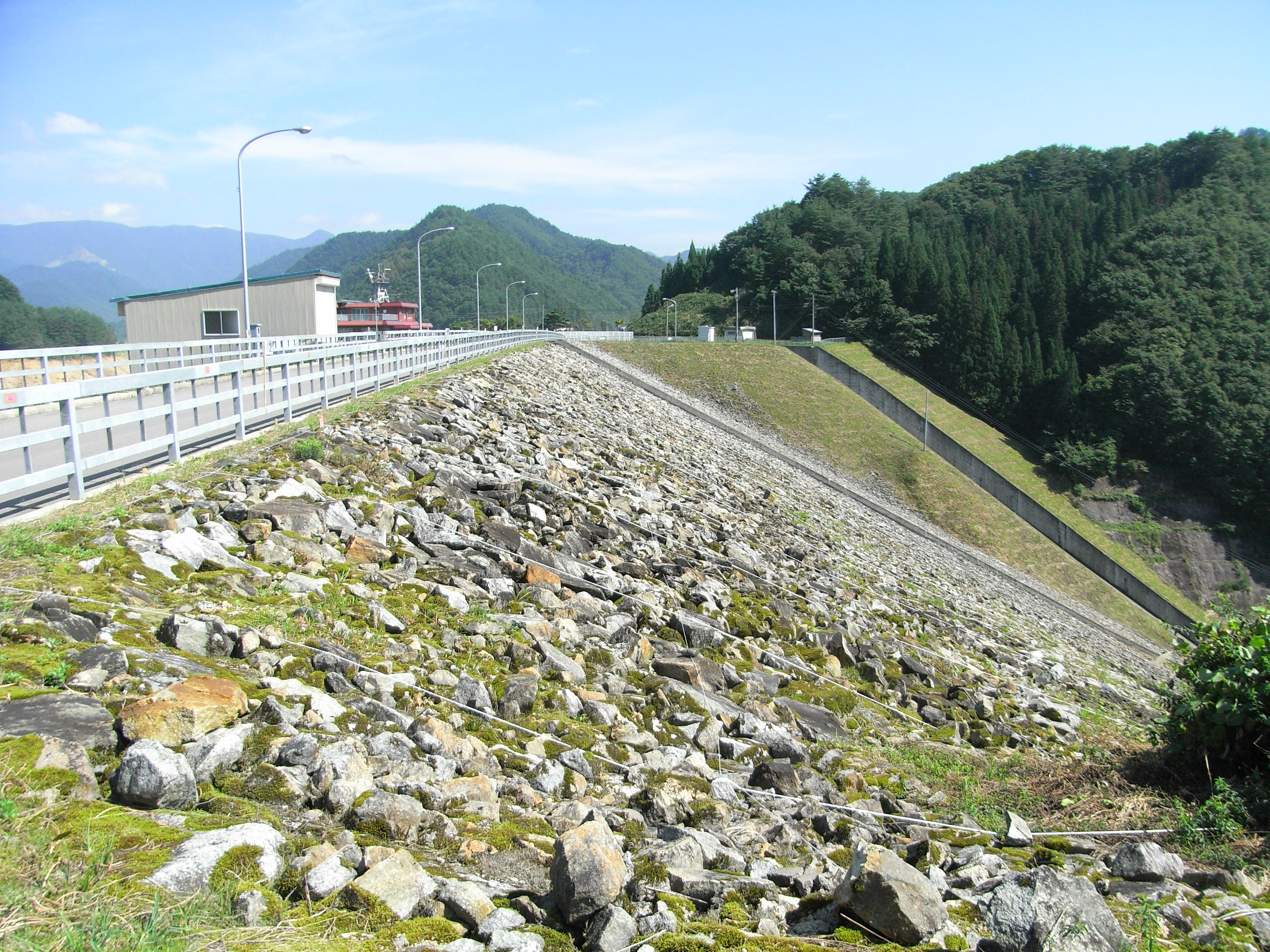
- Interactive map of Mizukubo Dam
- Location: Yamagata Prefecture, Japan
- Coordinates: 37°51′50″N 140°10′06″E
- Opening date: 1975

Dam and spillways
- Height: 62m
- Length: 205m

Reservoir
- Total capacity: 31000
- Catchment area: 68
- Surface area: 170 hectares

Mizukubo Dam is a rockfill dam located in Yamagata Prefecture in Japan. The dam is used for agriculture and water supply. The catchment area of the dam is 68 km^{2}. The dam impounds about 170 ha of land when full and can store 31000 thousand cubic meters of water. The dam was completed in 1975.

The climate is continental. The average temperature is 8 °C. The warmest month is July, at 19 °C, and the coldest is January, at −4 °C. The average annual rainfall is 1,655 mm. The wettest month is July, at 269 mm of rainfall, and the driest is January, at 72 mm.
