= Tazawagawa Dam =

Dam in Yamagata Prefecture, Japan

- Location within Japan
- Location: Yamagata Prefecture, Japan
- Coordinates: 38°50′35″N 140°1′41″E
- Construction began: 1981
- Opening date: 2001

Dam and spillways
- Height: 81 m (266 ft)
- Length: 185 m (607 ft)

Reservoir
- Total capacity: 9,100,000 m^{3} (320,000,000 cu ft)
- Catchment area: 23.2 km^{2} (9.0 sq mi)
- Surface area: 35 hectares (86 acres)

Tazawagawa Dam is a gravity dam located in Yamagata Prefecture in Japan. The dam is used for flood control and water supply. The catchment area of the dam is 23.2 km^{2}. The dam impounds about 35 ha of land when full and can store 9100 thousand cubic meters of water. The construction of the dam was started on 1981 and completed in 2001.
