= List of dams in Shiga Prefecture =

The following is a list of dams in Shiga Prefecture, Japan.

== List ==
Name	Location	Started	Opened	Height	Length	Image	DiJ number
Anegawa Dam		1977	2002	80.5 m (264 ft)	225 m (738 ft)		1365
Daidogawa Dam		1978		67.5 m (221 ft)	200 m (660 ft)		1367
Eigenji Dam		1952	1972	73.5 m (241 ft)	392 m (1,286 ft)		1361
Hinogawa Dam		1961	1965	25 m (82 ft)	105 m (344 ft)		1358
Hinowakigawa Dam		1961	1965	19 m (62 ft)	388 m (1,273 ft)		3601
Ichiino Dam							
Imago-ike Dam			1964	18.4 m (60 ft)	110 m (360 ft)		1357
Inukamigawa Dam			1946	45 m (148 ft)	135 m (443 ft)		1351
Ishidagawa Dam		1962	1969	43.5 m (143 ft)	140.1 m (460 ft)		1359
Kaigake-ike Dam			1954	19.4 m (64 ft)	96.9 m (318 ft)		1354
Nikkei Tameike Dam		1926	1944	21 m (69 ft)	130 m (430 ft)		3584
Obanashi Dam							
Ohhara Dam			1962	27.4 m (90 ft)	191.7 m (629 ft)		
Ohkuma-ike Dam			1920	16 m (52 ft)	60 m (200 ft)		1347
Ozuchi Dam		1966	1987	43.5 m (143 ft)	360 m (1,180 ft)		1364
Okuyama Dam		1963	1971	23 m (75 ft)	220 m (720 ft)		1360
Serikawa Dam			1955	27 m (89 ft)	135 m (443 ft)		1355
Tankai-ike Dam			1934	26 m (85 ft)	70 m (230 ft)		1348
Tongu-ike Dam			1965	22 m (72 ft)	115 m (377 ft)		3335
Tsuji Dam							
Usogawa Dam		1971	1979	56 m (184 ft)	192.8 m (633 ft)		1362
Yasugawa Dam			1951	52.7 m (173 ft)	142 m (466 ft)		
Yoroi Dam							
Zao Dam		1972	1990	56 m (184 ft)	370 m (1,210 ft)		1366

== See also ==
- Media related to Dams in Shiga prefecture at Wikimedia Commons
