= Zao Dam =

Zao Dam may also refer to:

- Zao Dam (Pakistan), dam in Pakistan
- Zao Dam (Shiga, Japan), dam in Japan
- Zao Dam (Yamagata, Japan), dam in Japan
