= Okuyama Dam =

Okuyama Dam may refer to:

- Okuyama Dam (Hiroshima)
- Okuyama Dam (Shiga)
