= Yasugawa Dam =

Dam in Shiga Prefecture, Japan

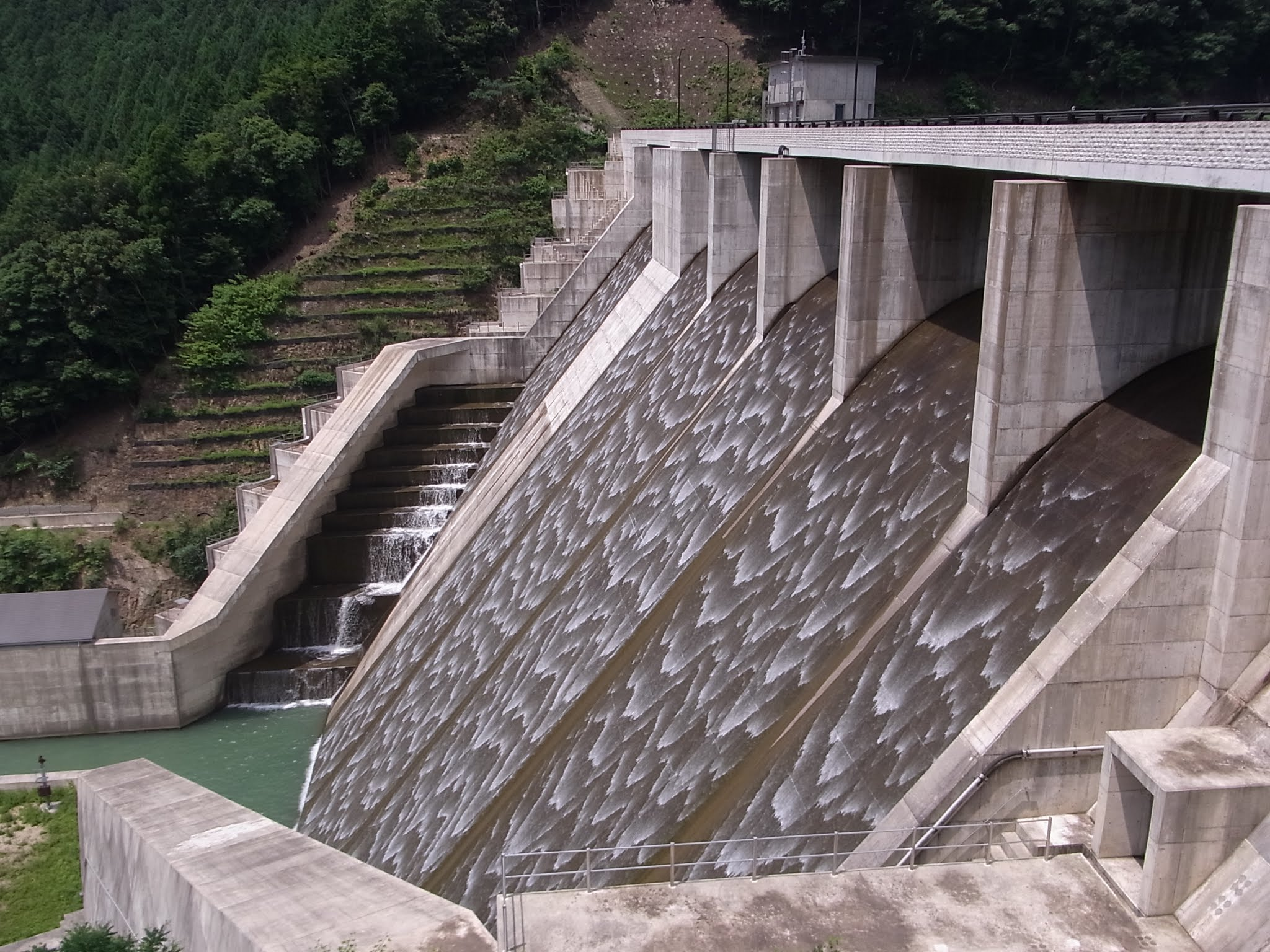

- Location within Japan
- Location: Shiga Prefecture, Japan
- Coordinates: 34°58′36″N 136°21′05″E
- Opening date: 1951

Dam and spillways
- Height: 52.7 m (173 ft)
- Length: 142 m (466 ft)

Reservoir
- Total capacity: 8,500,000 m^{3} (300,000,000 cu ft)
- Surface area: 50 hectares (120 acres)

Yasugawa Dam is a gravity dam located in Shiga prefecture in Japan. The dam is used for irrigation. The catchment area of the dam is 32.5km². The dam impounds about 50ha of land when full and can store 8,500,000m³ of water. The construction of the dam was completed in 1951.
