= Ohara Dam (Shiga) =

Dam in Shiga Prefecture, Japan

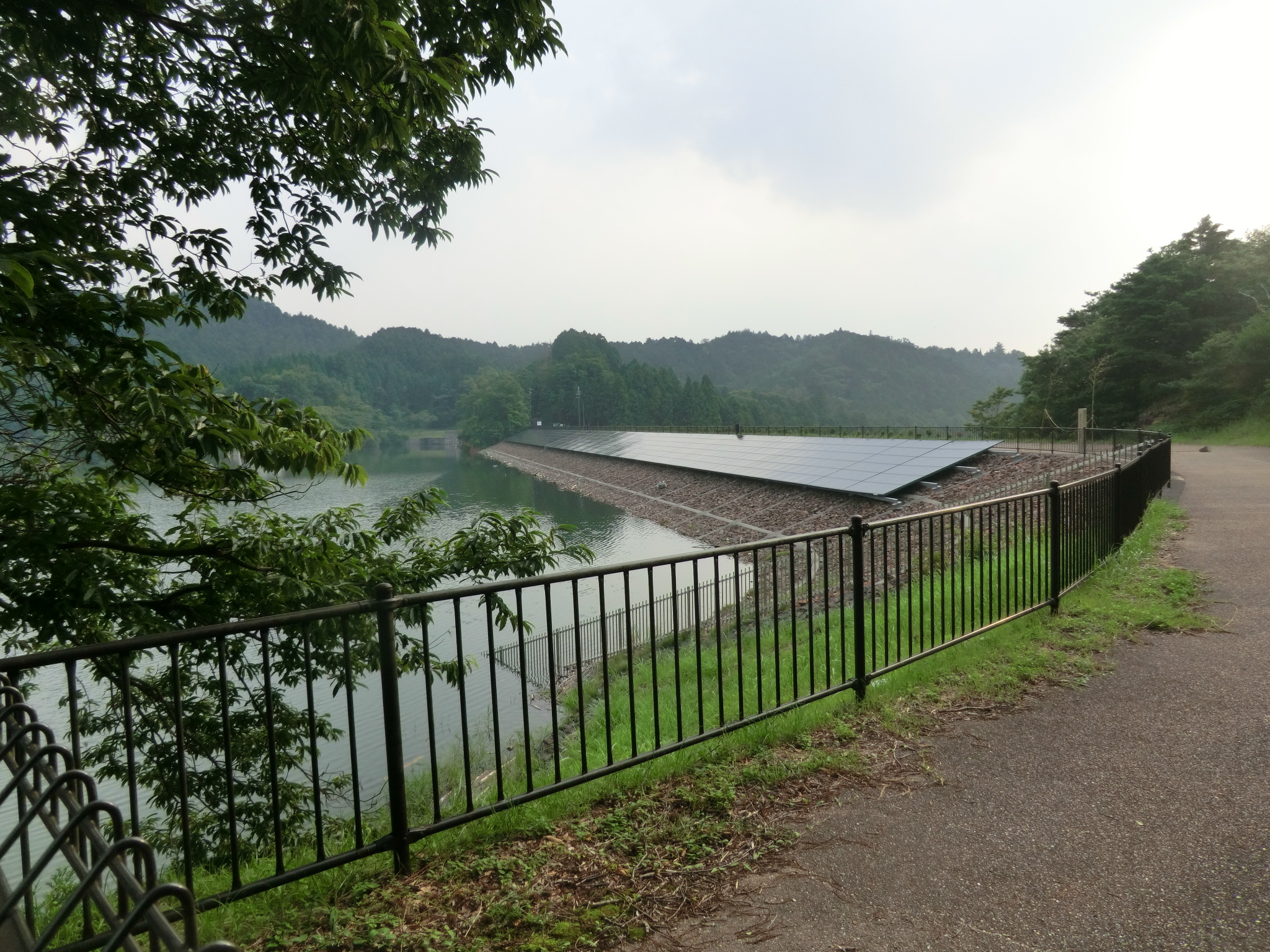

- Location within Japan
- Location: Shiga Prefecture, Japan
- Coordinates: 34°54′08″N 136°16′54″E
- Opening date: 1962

Dam and spillways
- Height: 27.4 m (90 ft)
- Length: 191.7 m (629 ft)

Reservoir
- Total capacity: 2,120,000 m^{3} (75,000,000 cu ft)
- Catchment area: 6.1 km^{2} (2.4 sq mi)
- Surface area: 19 hectares (47 acres)

Ohara Dam is an earthfill dam located in Shiga prefecture in Japan. The dam is used for irrigation. The catchment area of the dam is 6.1 km^{2}. The dam impounds about 19 ha of land when full and can store 2120 thousand cubic meters of water. The construction of the dam was completed in 1962.
