= Daidogawa Dam =

Dam in Shiga Prefecture, Japan

- Location within Japan
- Interactive map of Daidogawa Dam
- Location: Shiga Prefecture, Japan
- Coordinates: 34°56′33″N 136°0′43″E
- Construction began: 1978

Dam and spillways
- Height: 67.5 m (221 ft)
- Length: 200 m (660 ft)

Reservoir
- Total capacity: 22100 thousand cubic meters
- Catchment area: 152 sq. km
- Surface area: 120 hectares

Daidogawa Dam is a gravity dam located in Shiga prefecture in Japan. The dam is used for flood control. The catchment area of the dam is 152 km^{2}. The dam impounds about 120 ha of land when full and can store 22100 thousand cubic meters of water. The construction of the dam was done in 1978.
