= Tankai-ike Dam =

Dam in Shiga Prefecture, Japan

Tankai-ike dam
- Location within Japan
- Location: Shiga Prefecture, Japan
- Coordinates: 35°27′02″N 135°58′50″E
- Opening date: 1934

Dam and spillways
- Height: 26 m (85 ft)
- Length: 70 m (230 ft)

Reservoir
- Total capacity: 1,320,000 m^{3} (47,000,000 cu ft)
- Catchment area: 30 km^{2} (12 sq mi)
- Surface area: 12 hectares (30 acres)

Tankai-ike dam is an earthfill dam located in Shiga prefecture in Japan. The dam is used for irrigation. The catchment area of the dam is 30 km^{2}. The dam impounds about 12 ha of land when full and can store 1320 thousand cubic meters of water. The construction of the dam was completed in 1934.
