= Hinogawa Dam =

Dam in Shiga Prefecture, Japan

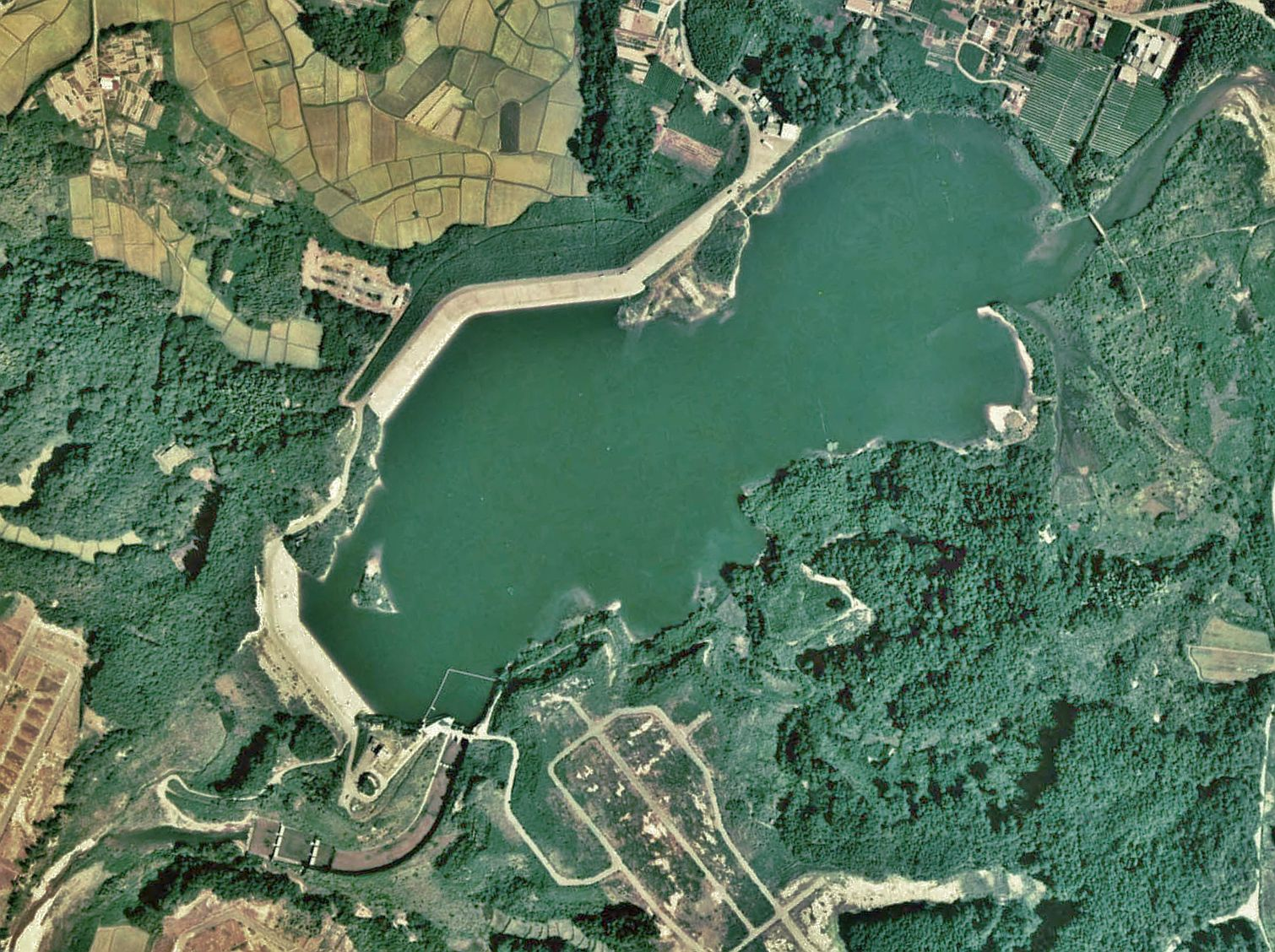

- Location within Japan
- Interactive map of Hinogawa Dam
- Location: Shiga Prefecture, Japan
- Coordinates: 35°0′19″N 136°15′33″E
- Construction began: 1961
- Opening date: 1965

Dam and spillways
- Height: 25 m (82 ft)
- Length: 105 m (344 ft)

Reservoir
- Total capacity: 1388 thousand cubic meters
- Catchment area: 22.4 sq. km
- Surface area: 29 hectares

Hinogawa Dam is a rockfill dam located in Shiga prefecture in Japan. The dam is used for flood control. The catchment area of the dam is 22.4 km^{2}. The dam impounds about 29 ha of land when full and can store 1388 thousand cubic meters of water. The construction of the dam was started on 1961 and completed in 1965.
