= Kaigake-ike Dam =

Dam in Shiga Prefecture, Japan

Kaigake-ike dam
- Location within Japan
- Interactive map of Kaigake-ike dam
- Location: Shiga Prefecture, Japan
- Coordinates: 34°58′22″N 136°16′17″E
- Opening date: 1954

Dam and spillways
- Height: 19.4 m (64 ft)
- Length: 96.9 m (318 ft)

Reservoir
- Total capacity: 260 thousand cubic meters
- Catchment area: 0.8 sq. km
- Surface area: 3 hectares

Kaigake-ike Dam is an earthfill dam located in Shiga prefecture in Japan. The dam is used for irrigation. The catchment area of the dam is 0.8 km^{2}. The dam impounds about 3 ha of land when full and can store 260 thousand cubic meters of water. The construction of the dam was completed in 1954.
