= Ohkuma-ike Dam =

Dam in Shiga Prefecture, Japan

Ohkuma-ike dam
- Location within Japan
- Location: Shiga Prefecture, Japan
- Coordinates: 34°57′20″N 136°17′37″E
- Opening date: 1920

Dam and spillways
- Height: 16 m (52 ft)
- Length: 60 m (200 ft)

Reservoir
- Total capacity: 20,000 m^{3} (710,000 cu ft)
- Catchment area: 0.2 km^{2} (0.077 sq mi)
- Surface area: hectares

Ohkuma-ike dam is an earthfill dam located in Shiga prefecture in Japan. The dam is used for irrigation. The catchment area of the dam is 0.2 km^{2}. The dam impounds about ha of land when full and can store 20 thousand cubic meters of water. The construction of the dam was completed in 1920.
