= Imago-ike Dam =

Dam in Shiga Prefecture, Japan

Imago-ike dam
- Location within Japan
- Interactive map of Imago-ike dam
- Location: Shiga Prefecture, Japan
- Coordinates: 34°57′49″N 136°12′47″E
- Opening date: 1964

Dam and spillways
- Height: 18.4 m (60 ft)
- Length: 110 m (360 ft)

Reservoir
- Total capacity: 110 thousand cubic meters
- Catchment area: 0.9 sq. km
- Surface area: 1 hectares

Imago-ike Dam is an earthfill dam, used for irrigation, located in Shiga prefecture in Japan. The catchment area of the dam is 0.9 km^{2}. The dam impounds about 1 ha of land when full and can store 110 thousand cubic meters of water. The construction of the dam was started on and completed in 1964.
