= Ishidagawa Dam =

Dam in Shiga Prefecture, Japan

- Location within Japan
- Interactive map of Ishidagawa Dam
- Location: Shiga Prefecture, Japan
- Coordinates: 35°26′43″N 135°57′20″E
- Construction began: 1962
- Opening date: 1969

Dam and spillways
- Height: 43.5 m (143 ft)
- Length: 140.1 m (460 ft)

Reservoir
- Total capacity: 2710 thousand cubic meters
- Catchment area: 23.4 sq. km
- Surface area: 16 hectares

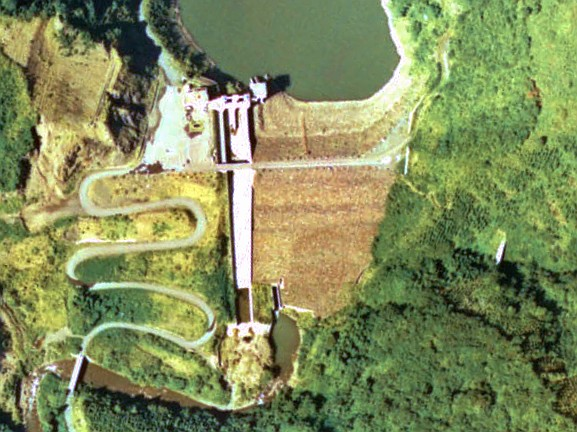
Ariel photo of the Ishidagawa Dam in 1975

Ishidagawa Dam is a rockfill dam located in Shiga prefecture in Japan. The dam is used for flood control. The catchment area of the dam is 23.4 km^{2}. The dam impounds about 16 ha of land when full and can store 2710 thousand cubic meters of water. The construction of the dam was started on 1962 and completed in 1969.
