= Okuyama Dam (Shiga) =

Dam in Shiga Prefecture, Japan

- Location within Japan
- Location: Shiga Prefecture, Japan
- Coordinates: 35°22′41″N 135°57′24″E
- Construction began: 1963
- Opening date: 1971

Dam and spillways
- Height: 23 m (75 ft)
- Length: 220 m (720 ft)

Reservoir
- Total capacity: 727,000 m^{3} (25,700,000 cu ft)
- Catchment area: 3.4 km^{2} (1.3 sq mi)
- Surface area: 10 hectares (25 acres)

Okuyama Dam is an earthfill dam located in Shiga prefecture in Japan. The dam is used for irrigation. The catchment area of the dam is 3.4 km^{2}. The dam impounds about 10 ha of land when full and can store 727 thousand cubic meters of water. The construction of the dam was started on 1963 and completed in 1971.
