= Eigenji Dam =

Dam in Shiga Prefecture, Japan

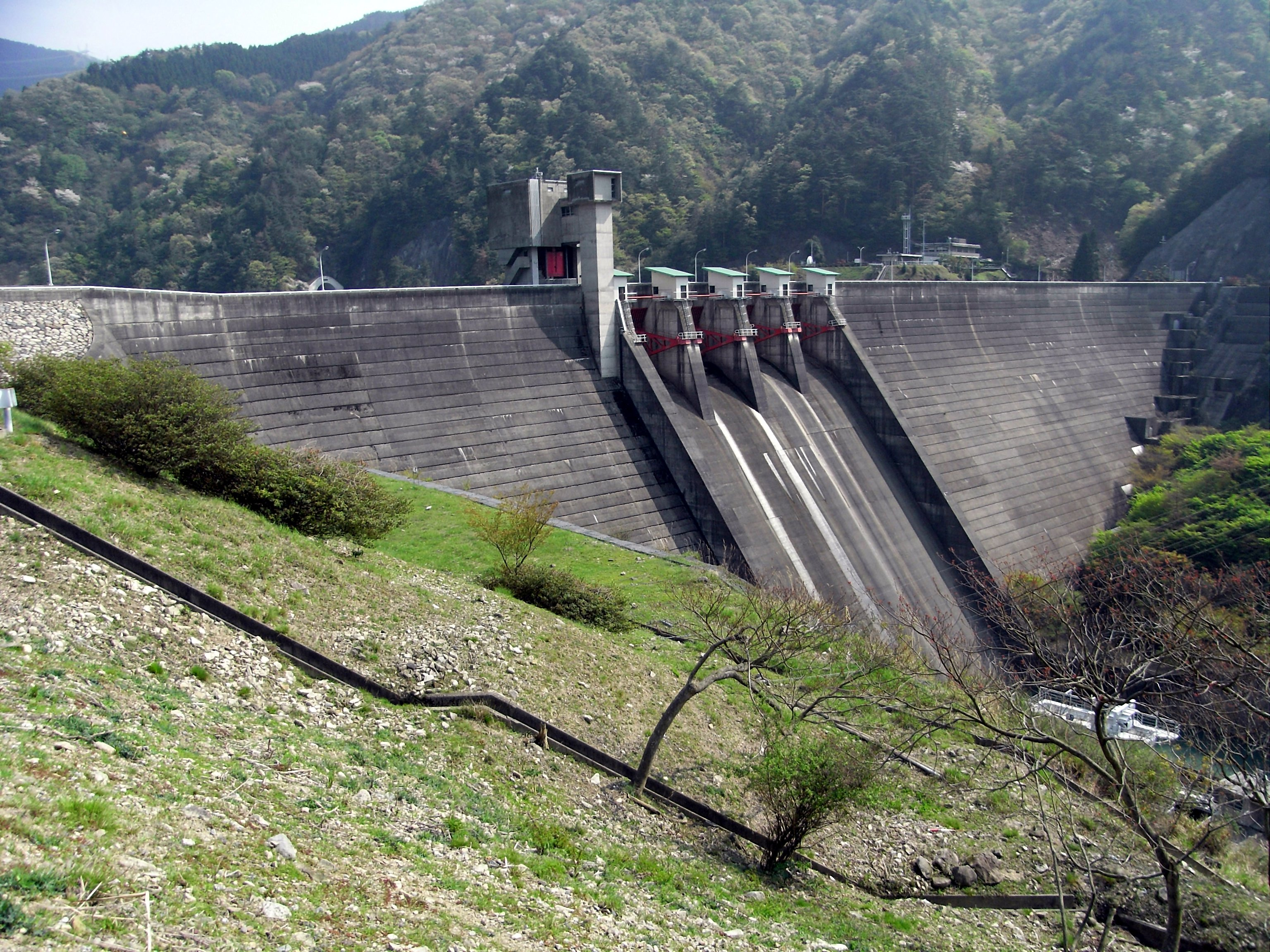

- Location within Japan
- Location: Shiga Prefecture, Japan
- Coordinates: 35°4′33″N 136°20′07″E
- Construction began: 1952
- Opening date: 1972

Dam and spillways
- Height: 73.5 m (241 ft)
- Length: 392 m (1,286 ft)

Reservoir
- Total capacity: 22741 thousand cubic meters
- Catchment area: 131.5 sq. km
- Surface area: 98 hectares

Eigenji Dam is a gravity concrete & fill dam (compound) dam located in Shiga prefecture in Japan. The dam is used for irrigation and power production. The catchment area of the dam is 131.5 km^{2}. The dam impounds about 98 ha of land when full and can store 22741 thousand cubic meters of water. The construction of the dam was started on 1952 and completed in 1972.
