= Anegawa Dam =

Dam in Shiga Prefecture, Japan

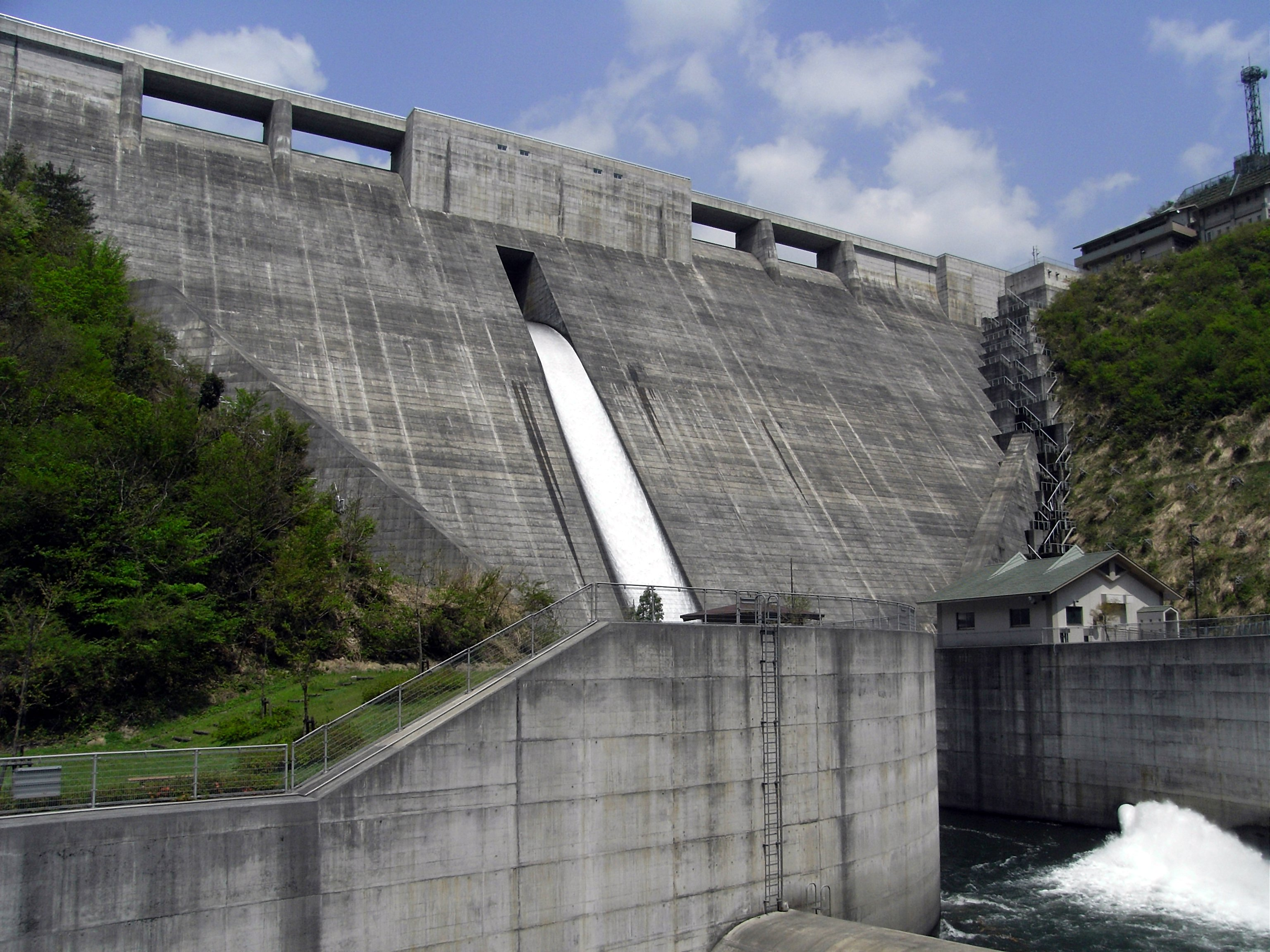

- Location within Japan
- Interactive map of Anegawa Dam
- Location: Shiga Prefecture, Japan
- Coordinates: 35°29′06″N 136°20′59″E
- Construction began: 1977
- Opening date: 2002

Dam and spillways
- Height: 80.5 m (264 ft)
- Length: 225 m (738 ft)

Reservoir
- Total capacity: 7600 thousand cubic meters
- Catchment area: 28.3 sq. km
- Surface area: 33 hectares

Anegawa Dam is a gravity dam located in Shiga prefecture in Japan. The dam is used for flood control and power production. The catchment area of the dam is 28.3 km^{2}. The dam impounds about 33 ha of land when full and can store 7600 thousand cubic meters of water. The construction of the dam was started on 1977 and completed in 2002.
