= Zao Dam (Pakistan) =

Dam in Pakistan

- Location within Pakistan
- Country: Pakistan
- Location: Khyber Agency, FATA
- Coordinates: 33°46′21.60″N 71°26′27.35″E
- Status: Operational
- Construction began: 2011
- Opening date: 2014
- Construction cost: PKR 142 million
- Owner: Government of Pakistan

Dam and spillways
- Type of dam: Rock Filled
- Height: 85 ft (26 m)
- Length: 270 ft (82 m)

Reservoir
- Total capacity: 800 acre feet
- Catchment area: 5.793 square miles

Zao Dam is a small earth core rock-fill dam in Khyber Agency of FATA, Pakistan.The construction of dam was started in July, 2011 and completed in June, 2014 at a cost of PKR 142 million. The dam has a height of 26 m, covered a length of around 82 m, with actual storage capacity of water 800 acre feet. The dam irrigates around 250 acres of area.

== See also ==
- List of dams and reservoirs in Pakistan
