= Tongu-ike Dam =

Dam in Shiga Prefecture, Japan

Tongu-ike dam
- Location within Japan
- Location: Shiga Prefecture, Japan
- Coordinates: 34°57′16″N 136°15′58″E
- Opening date: 1965

Dam and spillways
- Height: 22 m (72 ft)
- Length: 115 m (377 ft)

Reservoir
- Total capacity: 320,000 m^{3} (11,000,000 cu ft)
- Catchment area: 0.9 km^{2} (0.35 sq mi)
- Surface area: 2 hectares (4.9 acres)

Tongu-ike dam is an earthfill dam located in Shiga prefecture in Japan. The dam is used for irrigation. The catchment area of the dam is 0.9 km^{2}. The dam impounds about 2 ha of land when full and can store 320 thousand cubic meters of water. The construction of the dam was completed in 1965.
