= Usogawa Dam =

Dam in Shiga Prefecture, Japan

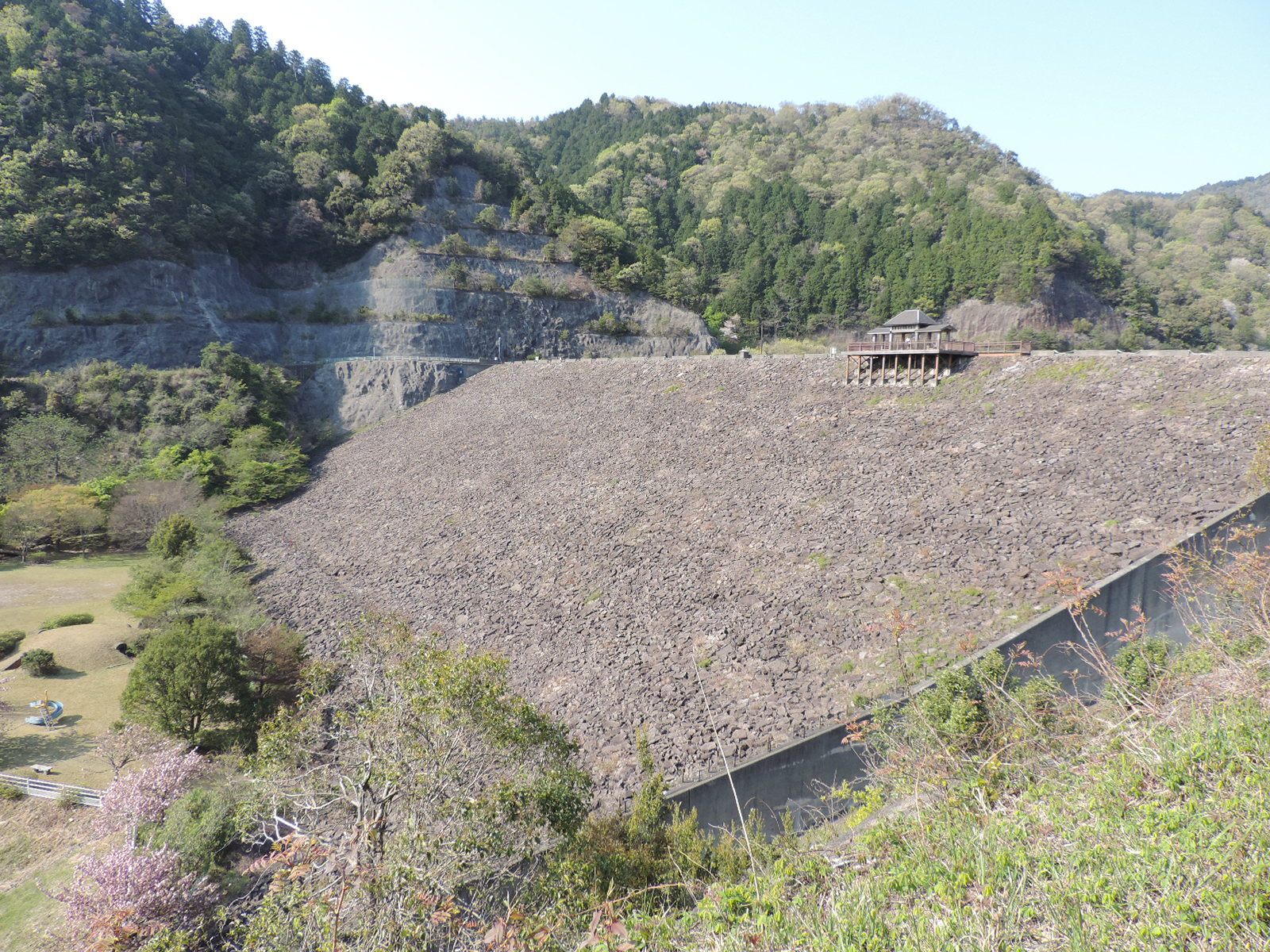

- Location within Japan
- Location: Shiga Prefecture, Japan
- Coordinates: 35°9′15″N 136°17′27″E
- Construction began: 1971
- Opening date: 1979

Dam and spillways
- Height: 56 m (184 ft)
- Length: 192.8 m (633 ft)

Reservoir
- Total capacity: 2,900,000 m^{3} (100,000,000 cu ft)
- Catchment area: 7.8 km^{2} (3.0 sq mi)
- Surface area: 17 hectares (42 acres)

Usogawa Dam is a rockfill dam located in Shiga prefecture in Japan. The dam is used for flood control. The catchment area of the dam is 7.8 km^{2}. The dam impounds about 17 ha of land when full and can store 2900 thousand cubic meters of water. The construction of the dam was started on 1971 and completed in 1979.
