= Serigawa Dam (Shiga) =

Dam in Shiga Prefecture, Japan

- Location within Japan
- Location: Shiga Prefecture, Japan
- Coordinates: 35°14′14″N 136°17′59″E
- Opening date: 1955

Dam and spillways
- Height: 27 m (89 ft)
- Length: 135 m (443 ft)

Reservoir
- Total capacity: 1,781,000 m^{3} (62,900,000 cu ft)
- Catchment area: 38.7 km^{2} (14.9 sq mi)
- Surface area: 14 hectares (35 acres)

Serigawa Dam is an earthfill dam located in Shiga prefecture in Japan. The dam is used for irrigation. The catchment area of the dam is 38.7 km^{2}. The dam impounds about 14 ha of land when full and can store 1781 thousand cubic meters of water. The construction of the dam was completed in 1955.
