= Nikkei Tameike Dam =

Dam in Shiga Prefecture, Japan

Nikkei Tameike dam
- Location within Japan
- Location: Shiga Prefecture, Japan
- Coordinates: 34°59′56″N 136°17′14″E
- Construction began: 1926
- Opening date: 1944

Dam and spillways
- Height: 21 m (69 ft)
- Length: 130 m (430 ft)

Reservoir
- Total capacity: 382,000 m^{3} (13,500,000 cu ft)
- Catchment area: 0.5 km^{2} (0.19 sq mi)
- Surface area: 4 hectares (9.9 acres)

Nikkei Tameike Dam is an earthfill dam located in Shiga prefecture in Japan. The dam is used for irrigation. The catchment area of the dam is 0.5 km^{2}. The dam impounds about 4 ha of land when full and can store 382 thousand cubic meters of water. The construction of the dam was started on 1926 and completed in 1944.
