= Inukamigawa Dam =

Dam in Shiga Prefecture, Japan

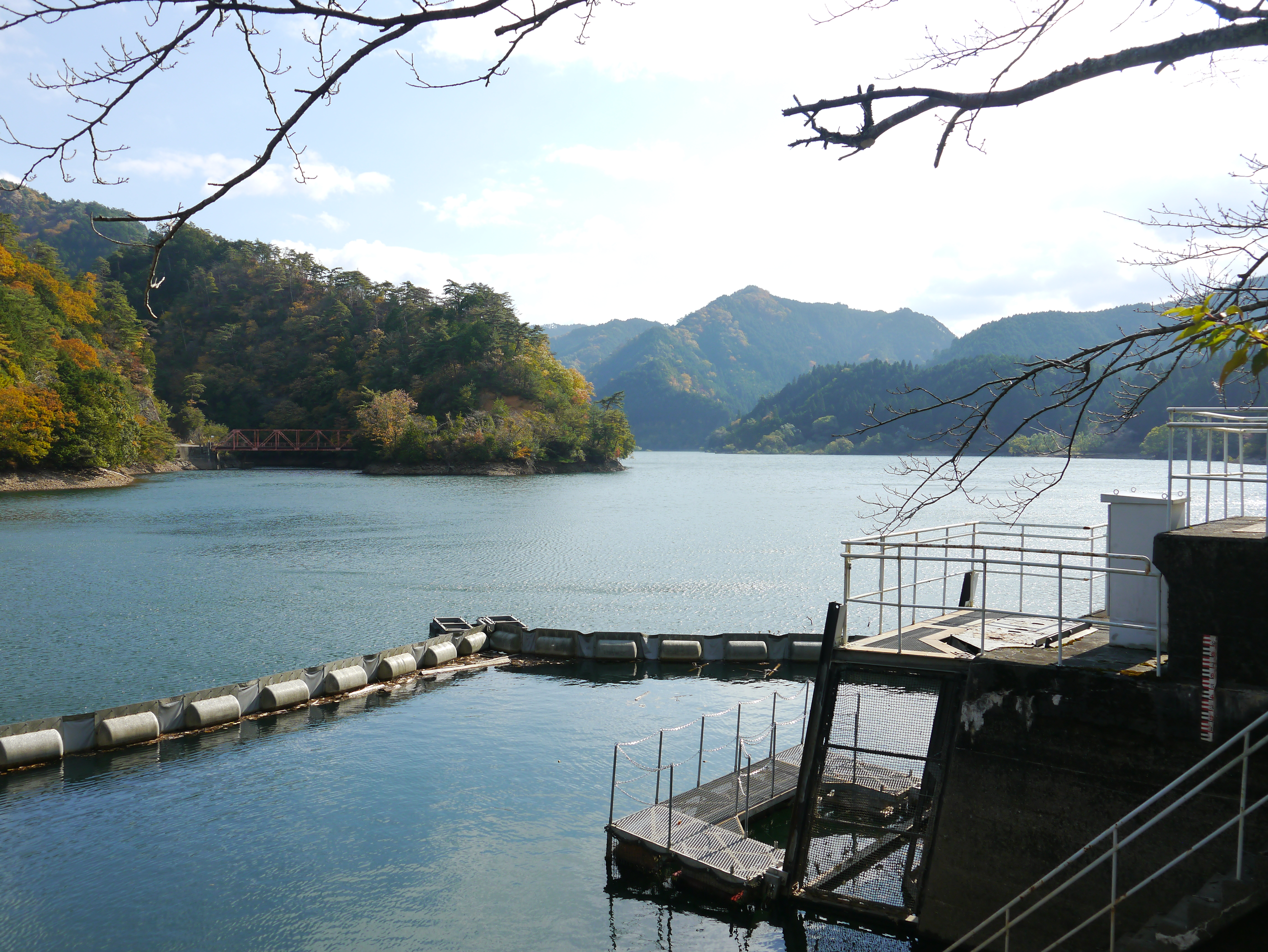

- Location within Japan
- Interactive map of Inukamigawa Dam
- Location: Shiga Prefecture, Japan
- Coordinates: 35°10′15″N 136°20′21″E
- Opening date: 1946

Dam and spillways
- Height: 45 m (148 ft)
- Length: 135 m (443 ft)

Reservoir
- Total capacity: 4500 thousand cubic meters
- Catchment area: 31.2 sq. km
- Surface area: 35 hectares

Inukamigawa Dam is a gravity dam located in Shiga prefecture in Japan. The dam is used for irrigation and power production. The catchment area of the dam is 31.2 km^{2}. The dam impounds about 35 ha of land when full and can store 4500 thousand cubic meters of water. The construction of the dam was completed in 1946.
