= Zao Dam (Shiga) =

Dam in Shiga Prefecture, Japan

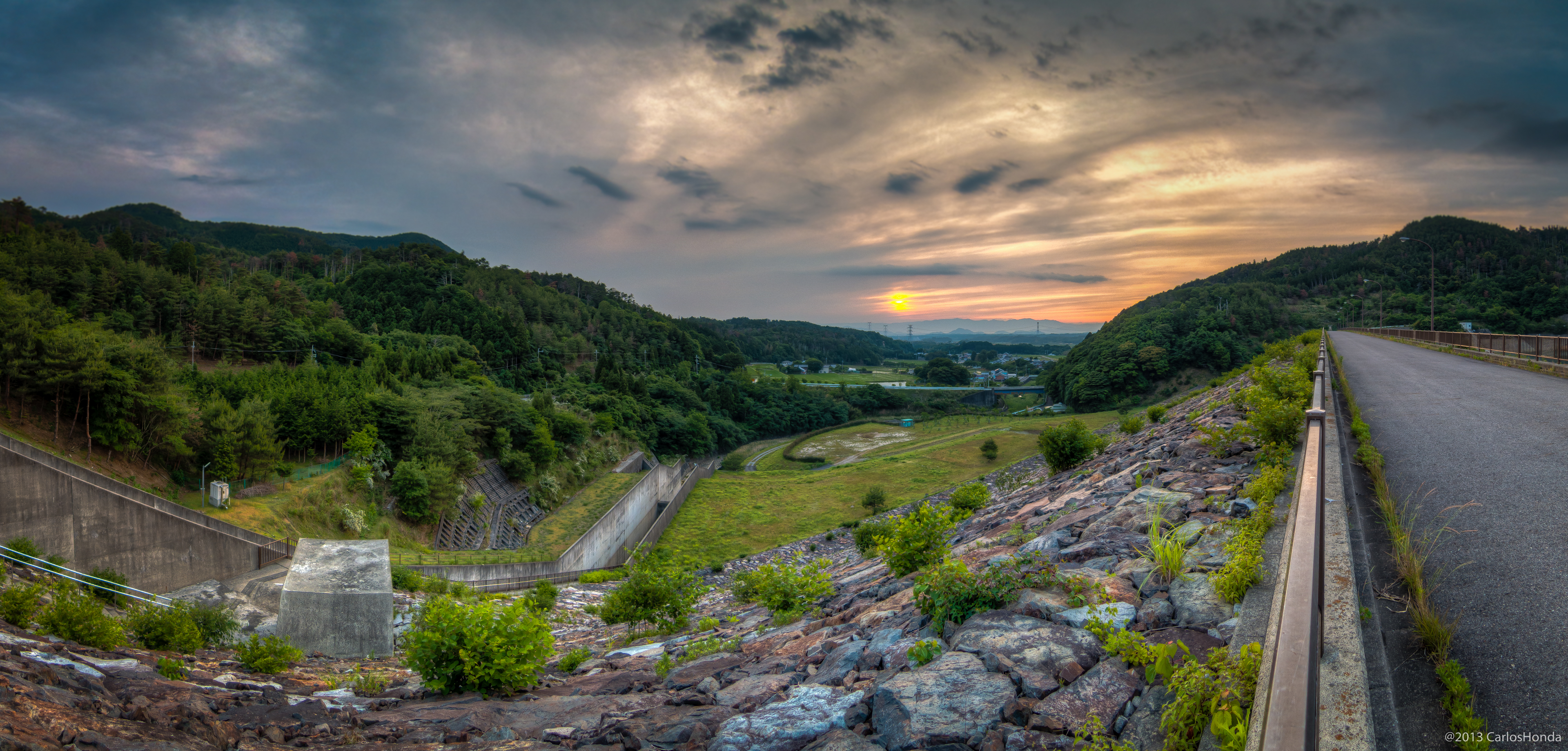

- Location within Japan
- Location: Shiga Prefecture, Japan
- Coordinates: 34°59′43″N 136°18′11″E
- Construction began: 1972
- Opening date: 1990

Dam and spillways
- Height: 56 m (184 ft)
- Length: 370 m (1,210 ft)

Reservoir
- Total capacity: 4,790,000 m^{3} (169,000,000 cu ft)
- Catchment area: 9.4 km^{2} (3.6 sq mi)
- Surface area: 33 hectares (82 acres)

Zao Dam is a rockfill dam located in Shiga prefecture in Japan. The dam is used for irrigation. The catchment area of the dam is 9.4 km^{2}. The dam impounds about 33 ha of land when full and can store 4790 thousand cubic meters of water. The construction of the dam was started on 1972 and completed in 1990.
