= List of dams in Tokushima Prefecture =

The following is a list of dams in Tokushima Prefecture, Japan.

== List ==
Name	Location	Started	Opened	Height	Length	Image	DiJ number
Fukui Dam		1972	1995	42.5 m (139 ft)	191 m (627 ft)		2134
Ikeda Dam				24 m (79 ft)			2130
Iwakura-ike Dam		1930	1932	18.3 m (60 ft)	195 m (640 ft)		3576
Kawaguchi Dam		1956	1960	30 m (98 ft)	182.5 m (599 ft)		2126
Kominono Dam		1965	1968	62.5 m (205 ft)	151.8 m (498 ft)		2129
Kozai Dam			1954	16.8 m (55 ft)	37.5 m (123 ft)		3575
Masaki Dam				67 m (220 ft)			2133
Matsuogawa Dam		1951	1953	67 m (220 ft)	195 m (640 ft)		2121
Minawa Dam		1957	1959	17 m (56 ft)	80.8 m (265 ft)		2123
Misaka-ike Dam			1946	17 m (56 ft)	58 m (190 ft)		3573
Miyakochi Dam		1959	1964	36 m (118 ft)	130 m (430 ft)		2128
Nagayasuguchi Dam		1950	1955	85.5 m (281 ft)	200 m (660 ft)		
Nagoro Dam		1960	1961	37 m (121 ft)	119.4 m (392 ft)		2127
Natsuko Dam		1979	1994	43.8 m (144 ft)	133.5 m (438 ft)		
Ohmidani Dam		1958	1960	31.5 m (103 ft)	86 m (282 ft)		2125
Ottachi Dam							
Wakamiyatani Dam		1933	1935	32.2 m (106 ft)	93 m (305 ft)		2120

== See also ==
- Media related to Dams in Tokushima prefecture at Wikimedia Commons
