= Iwakura =

Iwakura may refer to:

== Locations ==
- Iwakura, Aichi, a city in Aichi Prefecture, Japan
- Mount Iwakura, a mountain in Takarazuka, Hyōgo Prefecture, Japan

== Objects ==
- Iwakura rock, a sacred rock believed to contain a Shinto kami

=== Dams ===
- Iwakura Dam, a dam in Urugi, Nagano Prefecture, Japan
- Iwakura-ike Dam, a dam in Kochi Prefecture, Japan

== People ==
- Iwakura Tomomi (1825–1883), Japanese politician
- Kazuya Iwakura (born 1985) Japanese football player
- Mitsue Iwakura (born 1984), Japanese footballer

=== Characters ===
- Lain Iwakura, the protagonist of the anime television series Serial Experiments Lain
- Mai Iwakura, the protagonist of the television series Maiagare!

== Other uses ==
- Iwakura Mission, a Japanese diplomatic mission

== See also ==
- Iwakura Station (disambiguation)
