= Iwakura-ike Dam =

Iwakura-ike Dam may refer to:

- Iwakura-ike Dam (Kōchi)
- Iwakura-ike Dam (Tokushima)
