= Fukui Dam =

Dam in Tokushima Prefecture, Japan

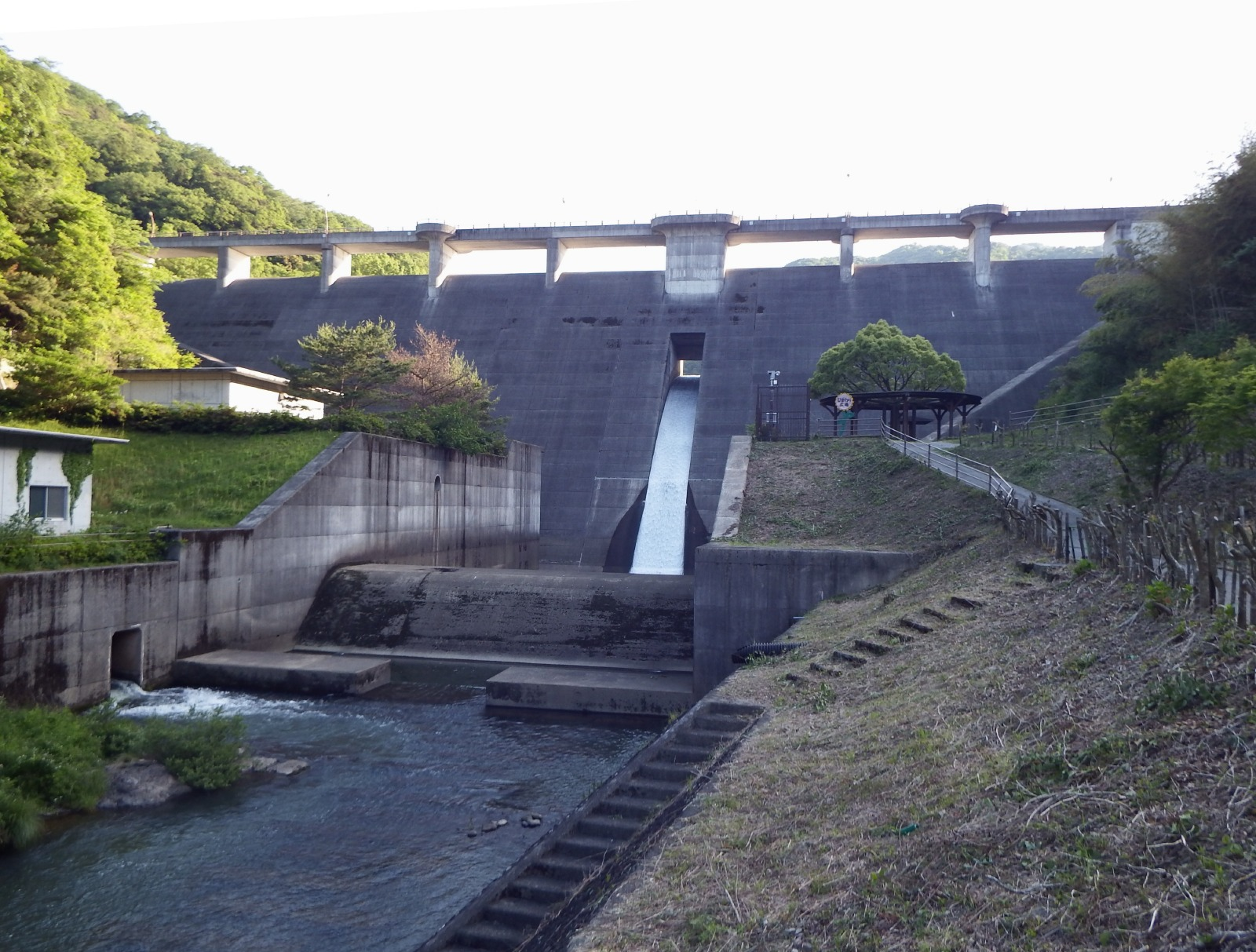

- Location within Japan
- Interactive map of Fukui Dam
- Location: Tokushima Prefecture, Japan
- Coordinates: 33°48′50″N 134°35′22″E
- Construction began: 1972
- Opening date: 1995

Dam and spillways
- Height: 42.5 m (139 ft)
- Length: 191 m (627 ft)

Reservoir
- Total capacity: 4750 thousand cubic meters
- Catchment area: 15 sq. km
- Surface area: 44 hectares

Fukui Dam is a gravity dam located in Tokushima prefecture in Japan. The dam is used for flood control. The catchment area of the dam is 15 km^{2}. The dam impounds about 44 ha of land when full and can store 4750 thousand cubic meters of water. The construction of the dam was started on 1972 and completed in 1995.
