= Ohmidani Dam =

Dam in Tokushima Prefecture, Japan

- Location within Japan
- Location: Tokushima Prefecture, Japan
- Coordinates: 33°50′43″N 134°19′06″E
- Construction began: 1958
- Opening date: 1960

Dam and spillways
- Height: 31.5 m (103 ft)
- Length: 86 m (282 ft)

Reservoir
- Total capacity: 451,000 m^{3} (15,900,000 cu ft)
- Catchment area: 101.3 km^{2} (39.1 sq mi)
- Surface area: 8 hectares (20 acres)

Ohmidani Dam is an arch dam located in Tokushima prefecture in Japan. The dam is used for power production. The catchment area of the dam is 101.3 km^{2}. The dam impounds about 8 ha of land when full and can store 451 thousand cubic meters of water. The construction of the dam was started on 1958 and completed in 1960.
