= Kawaguchi Dam =

Dam in Tokushima Prefecture, Japan

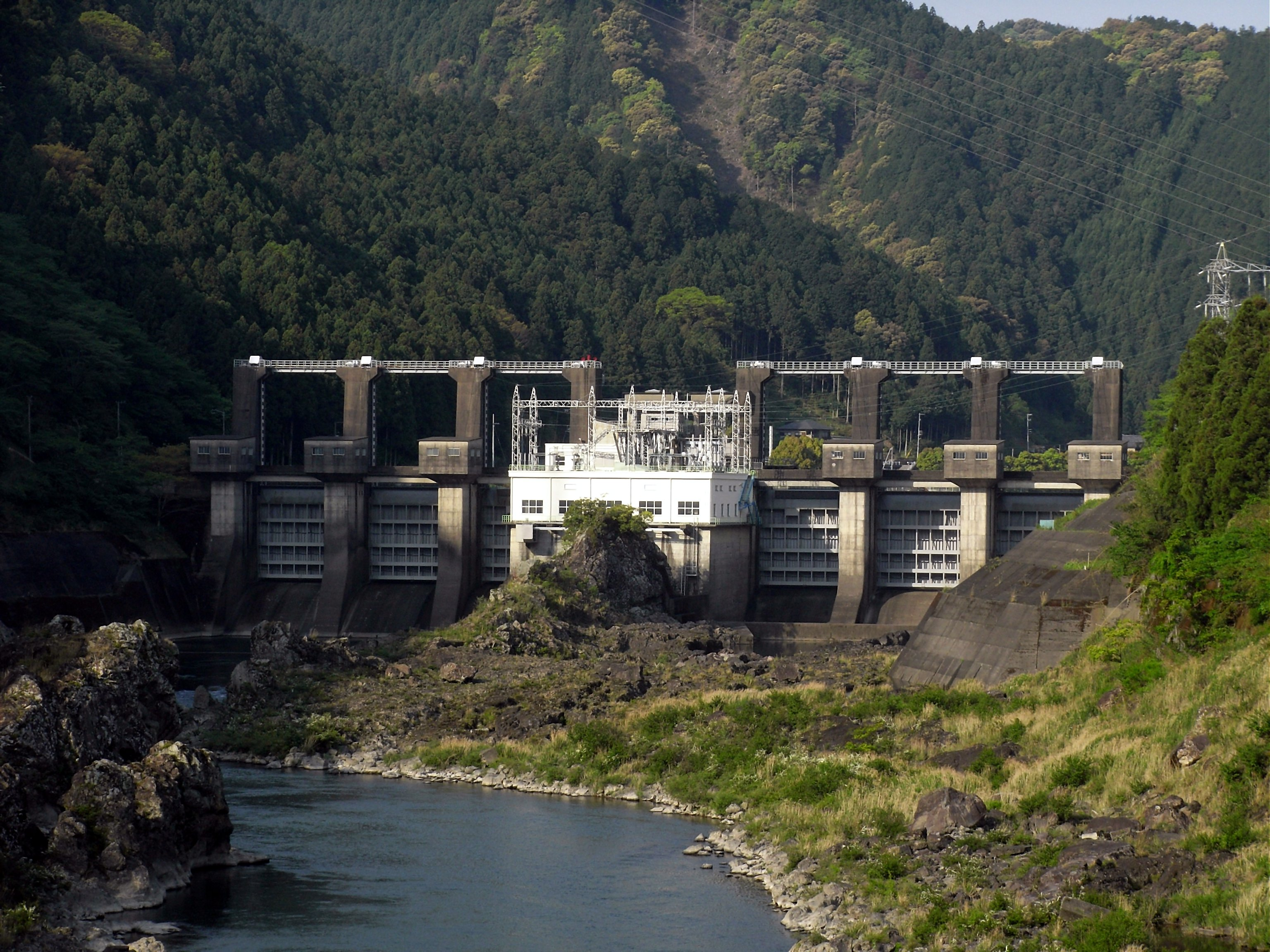

- Location within Japan
- Interactive map of Kawaguchi Dam
- Location: Tokushima Prefecture, Japan
- Coordinates: 33°47′57″N 134°28′01″E
- Construction began: 1956
- Opening date: 1960

Dam and spillways
- Height: 30 m (98 ft)
- Length: 182.5 m (599 ft)

Reservoir
- Total capacity: 6463 thousand cubic meters
- Catchment area: 656.7 sq. km
- Surface area: 87 hectares

Kawaguchi Dam is a gravity dam located in Tokushima prefecture in Japan. The dam is used for power production. The catchment area of the dam is 656.7 km^{2}. The dam impounds about 87 ha of land when full and can store 6463 thousand cubic meters of water. The construction of the dam was started in 1956 and completed in 1960.
