= Miyakochi Dam =

Dam in Tokushima Prefecture, Japan

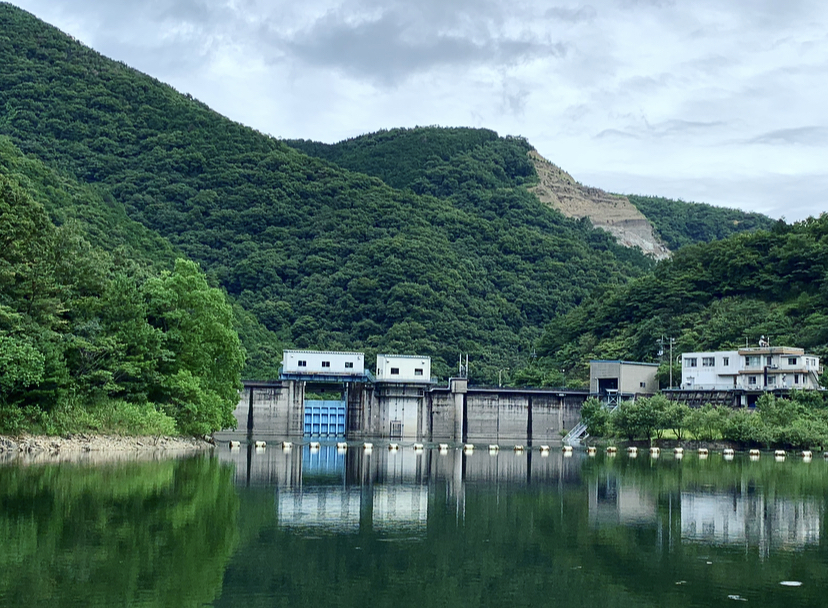

- Location within Japan
- Location: Tokushima Prefecture, Japan
- Coordinates: 34°8′51″N 134°21′18″E
- Construction began: 1959
- Opening date: 1964

Dam and spillways
- Height: 36 m (118 ft)
- Length: 130 m (430 ft)

Reservoir
- Total capacity: 1350 thousand cubic meters
- Catchment area: 23.1 sq. km
- Surface area: 13 hectares

Miyakochi Dam is a gravity dam located in Tokushima prefecture in Japan. The dam is used for flood control and irrigation. The catchment area of the dam is 23.1 km^{2}. The dam impounds about 13 ha of land when full and can store 1350 thousand cubic meters of water. The construction of the dam was started on 1959 and completed in 1964.
