= Kominono Dam =

Dam in Tokushima Prefecture, Japan

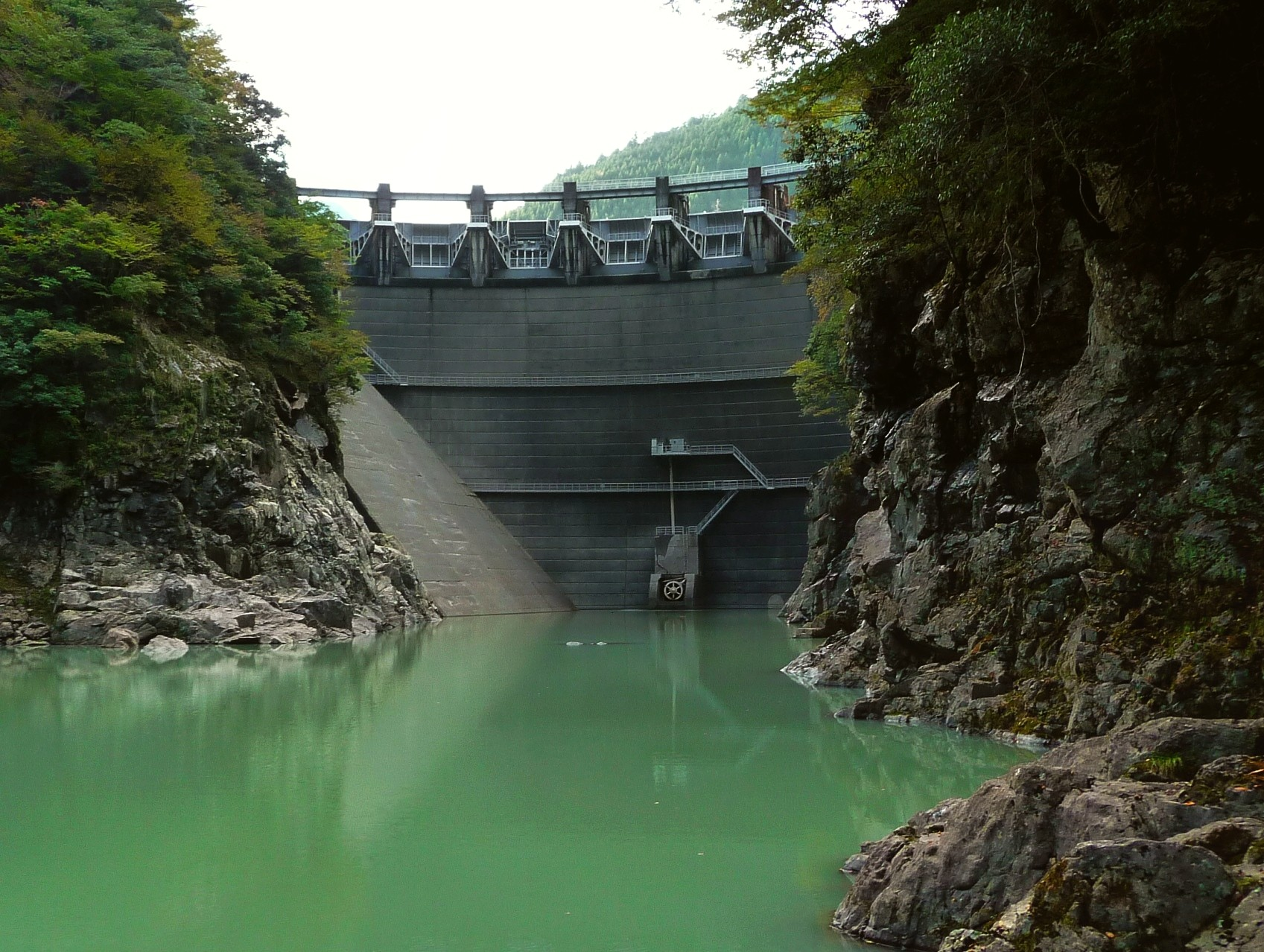

- Location within Japan
- Location: Tokushima Prefecture, Japan
- Coordinates: 33°48′22″N 134°14′42″E
- Construction began: 1965
- Opening date: 1968

Dam and spillways
- Height: 62.5 m (205 ft)
- Length: 151.8 m (498 ft)

Reservoir
- Total capacity: 16750 thousand cubic meters
- Catchment area: 270.8 sq. km
- Surface area: 89 hectares

Kominono Dam is an arch dam located in Tokushima prefecture in Japan. The dam is used for power production. The catchment area of the dam is 270.8 km^{2}. The dam impounds about 89 ha of land when full and can store 16750 thousand cubic meters of water. The construction of the dam started in 1965 and ended in 1968.
