= Misaka-ike Dam =

Dam in Tokushima Prefecture, Japan

- Location within Japan
- Location: Tokushima Prefecture, Japan
- Coordinates: 34°8′37″N 134°21′12″E
- Opening date: 1946

Dam and spillways
- Height: 17 m (56 ft)
- Length: 58 m (190 ft)

Reservoir
- Total capacity: 55 thousand cubic meters
- Catchment area: 24.2 sq. km
- Surface area: 2 hectares

Misaka-ike Dam is a gravity dam located in Tokushima prefecture in Japan. The dam is used for flood control and irrigation. The catchment area of the dam is 24.2 km^{2}. The dam impounds about 2 ha of land when full and can store 55 thousand cubic meters of water. The construction of the dam was completed in 1946.
