= Kozai Dam =

Dam in Tokushima Prefecture, Japan

- Location within Japan
- Location: Tokushima Prefecture, Japan
- Coordinates: 34°6′50″N 134°17′09″E
- Opening date: 1954

Dam and spillways
- Height: 16.8 m (55 ft)
- Length: 37.5 m (123 ft)

Reservoir
- Total capacity: 21 thousand cubic meters
- Catchment area: 0.1 sq. km
- Surface area: 1 hectares

Kozai Dam is an arch dam located in Tokushima prefecture in Japan. The dam is used for flood control and irrigation. The catchment area of the dam is 0.1 km^{2}. The dam impounds about 1 ha of land when full and can store 21 thousand cubic meters of water. The construction of the dam was completed in 1954.
