= Natsuko Dam =

Dam in Tokushima Prefecture, Japan

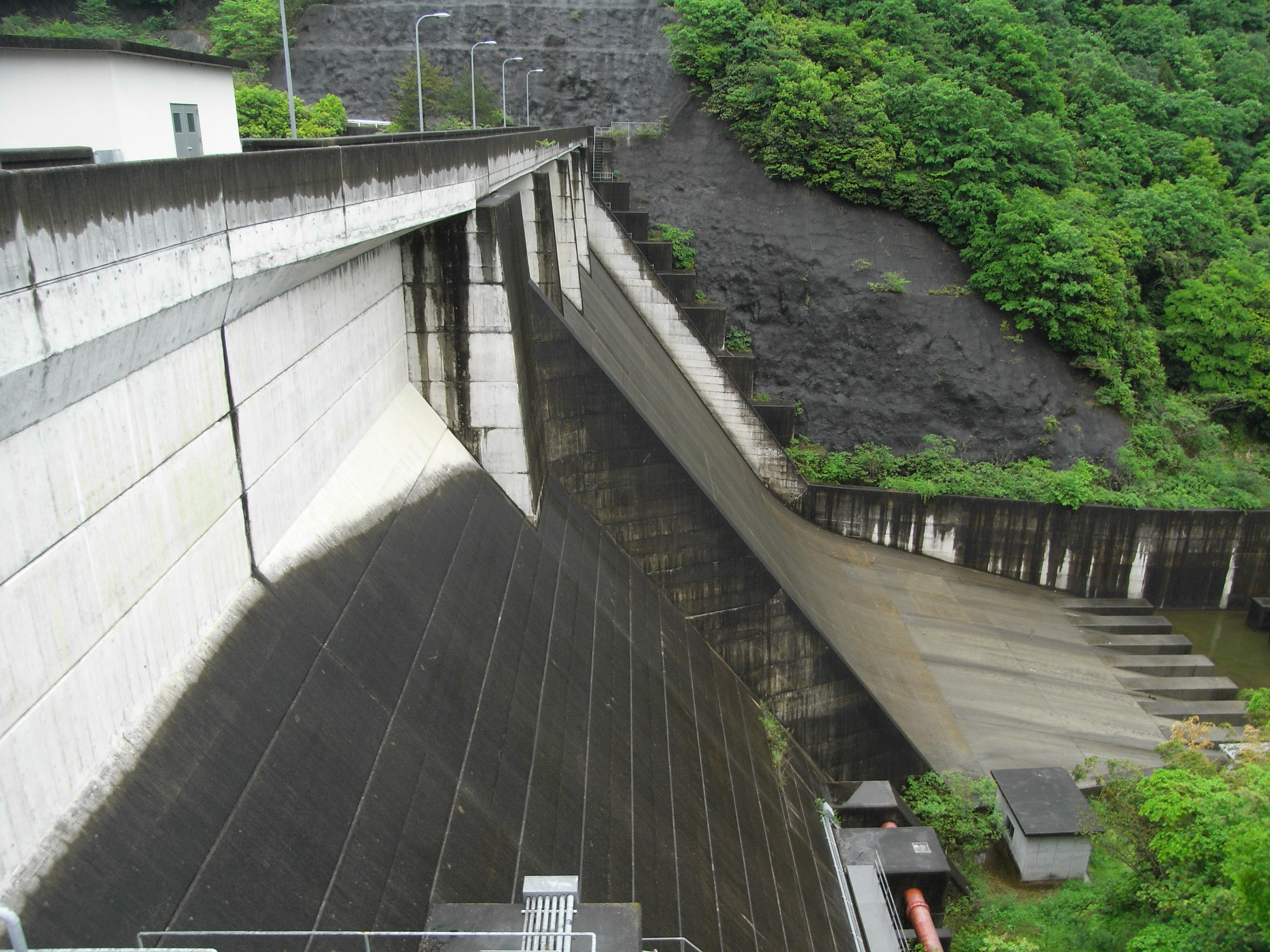

- Location within Japan
- Location: Tokushima Prefecture, Japan
- Coordinates: 34°8′07″N 134°9′40″E
- Construction began: 1979
- Opening date: 1994

Dam and spillways
- Height: 43.8 m (144 ft)
- Length: 133.5 m (438 ft)

Reservoir
- Total capacity: 1600 thousand cubic meters
- Catchment area: 26.7 sq. km
- Surface area: 14 hectares

Natsuko Dam is a gravity dam located in Tokushima prefecture in Japan. The dam is used for irrigation. The catchment area of the dam is 26.7 km^{2}. The dam impounds about 14 ha of land when full and can store 1600 thousand cubic meters of water. The construction of the dam was started on 1979 and completed in 1994.
