= Iwakura Station =

Iwakura Station (岩倉駅) is the name of several train stations in Japan:

- Iwakura Station (Aichi) in Iwakura, Aichi Prefecture
- Iwakura Station (Kyoto) in Sakyō-ku, Kyoto
- Iwakura Station (Yamaguchi) in Yamaguchi
