= Minawa Dam =

Dam in Tokushima Prefecture, Japan

- Location within Japan
- Location: Tokushima Prefecture, Japan
- Coordinates: 33°57′23″N 133°47′29″E
- Construction began: 1957
- Opening date: 1959

Dam and spillways
- Height: 17 m (56 ft)
- Length: 80.8 m (265 ft)

Reservoir
- Total capacity: 299 thousand cubic meters
- Catchment area: 850.1 sq. km
- Surface area: 7 hectares

Minawa Dam is a gravity dam located in Tokushima prefecture in Japan. The dam is used for power production. The catchment area of the dam is 850.1 km^{2}. The dam impounds about 7 ha of land when full and can store 299 thousand cubic meters of water. The construction of the dam was started on 1957 and completed in 1959.
