= Iwakura-ike Dam (Tokushima) =

Dam in Tokushima Prefecture, Japan

- Location within Japan
- Interactive map of Iwakura-ike Dam
- Location: Tokushima Prefecture, Japan
- Coordinates: 34°4′12″N 134°6′43″E
- Construction began: 1930
- Opening date: 1932

Dam and spillways
- Height: 18.3 m (60 ft)
- Length: 195 m (640 ft)

Reservoir
- Total capacity: 101 thousand cubic meters
- Catchment area: 10.7 sq. km
- Surface area: 1 hectares

Iwakura-ike Dam is an earthfill dam located in Tokushima prefecture in Japan. The dam is used for irrigation. The catchment area of the dam is 10.7 km^{2}. The dam impounds about 1 ha of land when full and can store 101 thousand cubic meters of water. The construction of the dam was started on 1930 and completed in 1932.
