= Nagoro Dam =

Dam in Tokushima Prefecture, Japan

- Location within Japan
- Location: Tokushima Prefecture, Japan
- Coordinates: 33°51′03″N 134°1′45″E
- Construction began: 1960
- Opening date: 1961

Dam and spillways
- Height: 37 m (121 ft)
- Length: 119.4 m (392 ft)

Reservoir
- Total capacity: 1367 thousand cubic meters
- Catchment area: 21.2 sq. km
- Surface area: 9 hectares

Nagoro Dam is a gravity dam located in Tokushima prefecture in Japan. The dam is used for power production. The catchment area of the dam is 21.2 km^{2}. The dam impounds about 9 ha of land when full and can store 1367 thousand cubic meters of water. The construction of the dam was started on 1960 and completed in 1961.
