= Matsuogawa Dam =

Dam in Tokushima Prefecture, Japan

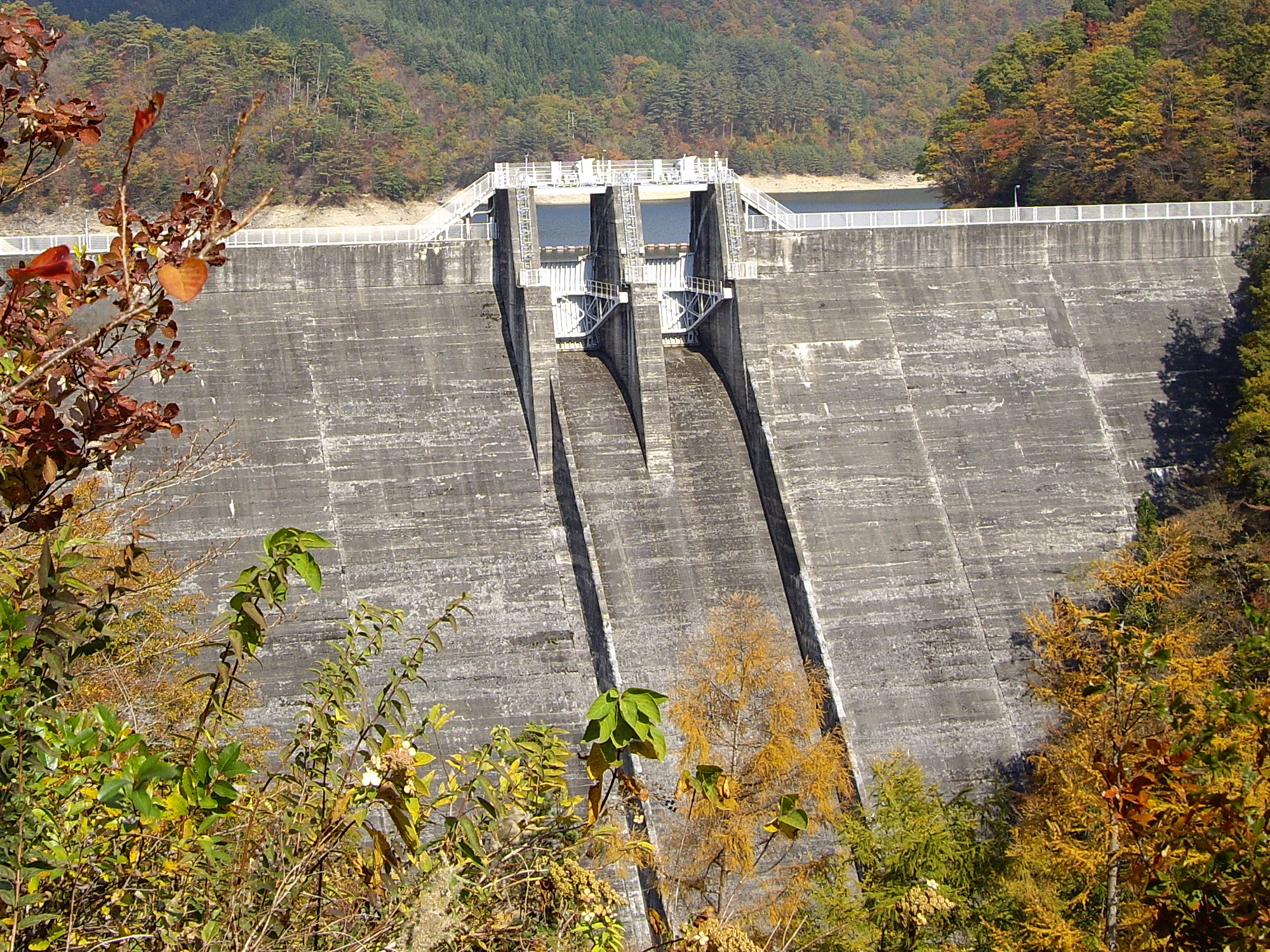

- Location within Japan
- Location: Tokushima Prefecture, Japan
- Coordinates: 33°57′25″N 133°55′04″E
- Construction began: 1951
- Opening date: 1953

Dam and spillways
- Height: 67 m (220 ft)
- Length: 195 m (640 ft)

Reservoir
- Total capacity: 14300 thousand cubic meters
- Catchment area: 103 sq. km
- Surface area: 59 hectares

Matsuogawa Dam is a gravity dam located in Tokushima prefecture in Japan. The dam is used for power production. The catchment area of the dam is 103 km^{2}. The dam impounds about 59 ha of land when full and can store 14,300 thousand cubic meters of water. The construction of the dam was started in 1951 and completed in 1953.
