= Nagayasuguchi Dam =

Dam in Tokushima Prefecture, Japan

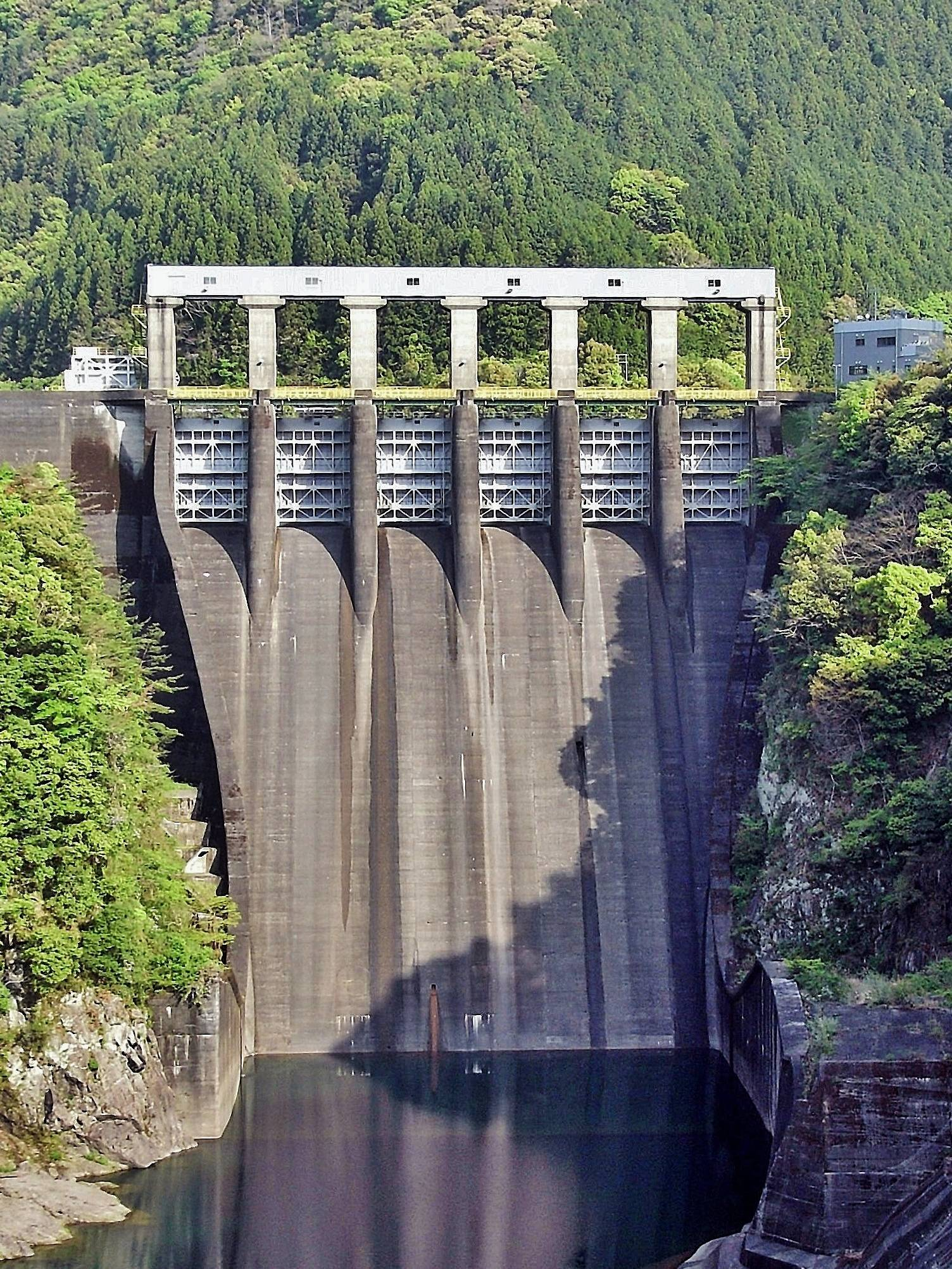

- Location within Japan
- Location: Tokushima Prefecture, Japan
- Coordinates: 33°48′32″N 134°21′37″E
- Construction began: 1950
- Opening date: 1955

Dam and spillways
- Height: 85.5 m (281 ft)
- Length: 200 m (660 ft)

Reservoir
- Total capacity: 54278 thousand cubic meters
- Catchment area: 538.9 sq. km
- Surface area: 224 hectares

Nagayasuguchi Dam is a gravity dam located in Tokushima prefecture in Japan. The dam is used for flood control and power production. The catchment area of the dam is 538.9 km^{2}. The dam impounds about 224 ha of land when full and can store 54278 thousand cubic meters of water. The construction of the dam was started on 1950 and completed in 1955. The dam was renovated in 1998.
