= Wakamiyatani Dam =

Dam in Tokushima Prefecture, Japan

- Location within Japan
- Location: Tokushima Prefecture, Japan
- Coordinates: 33°53′54″N 133°49′10″E
- Construction began: 1933
- Opening date: 1935

Dam and spillways
- Height: 32.2 m (106 ft)
- Length: 93 m (305 ft)

Reservoir
- Total capacity: 94,000 m^{3} (3,300,000 cu ft)
- Catchment area: 211.2 km^{2} (81.5 sq mi)
- Surface area: 1 hectare (2.5 acres)

Wakamiyatani Dam is a gravity dam located in Tokushima prefecture in Japan. The dam is used for power production. The catchment area of the dam is 211.2 km^{2}. The dam impounds about 1 ha of land when full and can store 94 thousand cubic meters of water. The construction of the dam was started on 1933 and completed in 1935.
