= Mount Iwakura =

Mountain in Takarazuka, Hyōgo Prefecture, Japan

- 岩倉山
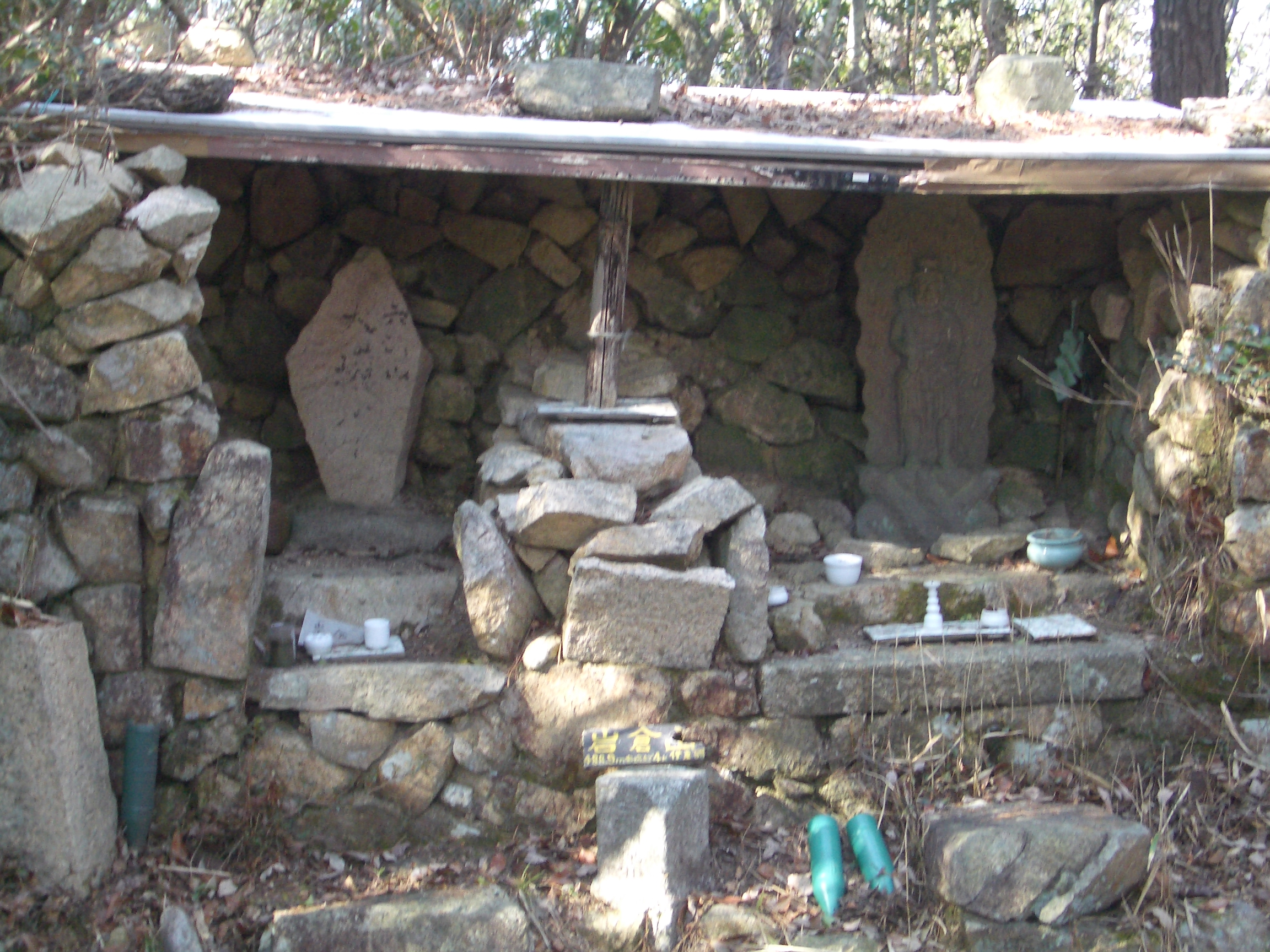
- The Shrine on the Top of the Mount Iwakura

Highest point
- Elevation: 488.4 m (1,602 ft)
- Coordinates: 34°48′N 135°19′E

Naming
- Language of name: Japanese
- Pronunciation: [iwakɯɾajama]

Geography
- Location: Takarazuka, Hyōgo, Japan
- Parent range: Rokko Mountains

Mount Iwakura (岩倉山, Iwakura-yama) is a 488.4-metre-high (1,602 ft) mountain in Takarazuka, Hyōgo Prefecture, Japan.

== Outline ==
Mount Iwakura is a part of Setonaikai National Park. The mountain is a peak on the eastern ridge of the Rokko Mountains. It is said that the mountain received its name because of the stone shrine (Iwakura) on the top of the mountain.

== Access ==
- Takarazuka Station of the JR Fukuchiyama Line (JR Takarazuka Line)
- Takarazuka Station of the Hankyu Takarazuka Line or the Hankyu Imazu Line
