= Iwakura-ike Dam (Kōchi) =

Dam in Kochi Prefecture, Japan

- Location within Japan
- Interactive map of Iwakura-ike Dam
- Official name: 岩倉池
- Location: Kochi Prefecture, Japan
- Coordinates: 33°32′21″N 133°49′14″E
- Opening date: 1967

Dam and spillways
- Height: 22 m (72 ft)
- Length: 53 m (174 ft)

Reservoir
- Total capacity: 73 thousand cubic meters
- Catchment area: 0.3 sq. km
- Surface area: 1 hectares

Iwakura-ike Dam (Japanese: 岩倉池) is an earthfill dam located in Kochi Prefecture in Japan. The dam is used for irrigation. The catchment area of the dam is 0.3 km^{2}. The dam impounds about 1 ha of land when full and can store 73 thousand cubic meters of water. The construction of the dam was completed in 1967.

== See also ==
- List of dams in Japan
