= Lay-duce =

Japanese animation studio

Lay-duce, Inc.
- Native name: 株式会社Lay-duce
- Romanized name: Kabushiki-gaisha Rei-dyūsu
- Type: Animation studio
- Industry: Japanese animation
- Founded: August 2013; 13 years ago
- Founder: Noritomo Yonai
- Headquarters: Ohashi Central Building 6F, Chūō, Nakano, Tokyo, Japan
- Key people: Noritomo Yonai (CEO)
- Number of employees: 49 (as of May 2025)
- Parent: Twin Engine (2018–2021); Hayate Inc. (2026–present)
- Website: lay-duce.co.jp

Lay-duce, Inc. (Japanese: 株式会社Lay-duce, Hepburn: Kabushiki-gaisha Rei-dyūsu) is a Japanese animation studio based in Nakano, Tokyo.

It was formed in August 2013 by former Group TAC and Bones producer Noritomo Yonai.

On April 3, 2026, the studio was acquired by Hayate Inc. as a wholly owned subsidiary.

== Productions ==
=== Television series ===
Title	Director(s)	First run start date	First run end date	Eps	Note(s)	Ref(s)
Go! Go! 575	Takebumi Anzai	January 9, 2014	January 30, 2014	4	Based on a multimedia project by Sega. Co-production with C2C.	
Classroom Crisis	Kenji Nagasaki	July 3, 2015	September 25, 2015	13	Original work.	
Magi: Adventure of Sinbad	Yoshikazu Miyao	April 23, 2016	July 2, 2016	13	Adaptation of the manga series by Shinobu Ohtaka.	
Our love has always been 10 centimeters apart	Hitoshi Nanba; Takurō Tsukada	November 24, 2017	December 30, 2017	6	Based on a Vocaloid song series by HoneyWorks.	
Release the Spyce	Akira Sato	October 7, 2018	December 23, 2018	12	Original work.	
O Maidens in Your Savage Season	Masahiro Ando; Takurō Tsukada	July 5, 2019	September 20, 2019	12	Adaptation of the manga series by Mari Okada and Nao Emoto.	
I-Chu: Halfway Through the Idol	Hitoshi Nanba	January 6, 2021	March 24, 2021	12	Based on a smartphone game by Liber Entertainment.	
Fanfare of Adolescence	Makoto Katō	April 2, 2022	June 25, 2022	13	Original work.	
Heroines Run the Show	Noriko Hashimoto	April 7, 2022	June 23, 2022	12	Based on a Vocaloid song series by HoneyWorks.	
Tomo-chan Is a Girl!	Hitoshi Nanba	January 5, 2023	March 30, 2023	13	Adaptation of the manga series by Fumita Yanagida.	
#Compass 2.0: Combat Providence Analysis System	Hitoshi Nanba	April 8, 2025	June 24, 2025	12	Based on an online game by NHN PlayArt and Dwango.	
Clevatess	Kiyotaka Taguchi	July 2, 2025	September 17, 2025	12	Adaptation of the manga series by Yūji Iwahara.	
Please Excuse My Younger Brothers	Hitoshi Nanba	July 4, 2026	TBA	24	Adaptation of the manga series by Akira Ozaki.	
Clevatess (season 2)	Kiyotaka Taguchi	July 8, 2026	September 30, 2026	13	Sequel to Clevatess.	

=== Films ===
Title	Director(s)	Release Date	Note(s)	Ref(s)
Fate/Grand Order: First Order	Hitoshi Nanba	December 31, 2016	Based on the Fate/Grand Order mobile game prologue.	
Fate/Grand Order: Moonlight/Lostroom	Hitoshi Nanba; Takurō Tsukada	December 31, 2017	Sequel to Fate/Grand Order: First Order	

=== Original video animations ===
Title	Director(s)	Release date	Eps	Note(s)	Ref(s)
Magi: Adventure of Sinbad	Yoshikazu Miyao	May 16, 2014 — July 15, 2015	5	Prequel to Magi: The Labyrinth of Magic	
YuruYuri	Daigo Yamagishi	November 13, 2019	1	Sequel to YuruYuri San Hai!.	

=== Original net animations ===
Title	Director(s)	Release date	Eps	Note(s)	Ref(s)
Rising Impact	Hitoshi Nanba	June 22, 2024 — August 6, 2024	26	Adaptation of the manga series by Nakaba Suzuki.	
