= Fanfare of Adolescence =

Japanese anime television series

- Key visual

群青のファンファーレ (Gunjō no Fanfāre)
- Genre: Sports
- Anime television series
- Directed by: Makoto Katō
- Written by: Team Fanfare
- Music by: Hiroyuki Sawano
- Studio: Lay-duce
- Licensed by: Crunchyroll (streaming); SEA: Plus Media Networks Asia
- Original network: Tokyo MX, BS11, GTV, GYT, MBS, AT-X
- English network: SEA: Aniplus Asia
- Original run: April 2, 2022 – June 25, 2022
- Episodes: 13

Fanfare of Adolescence (Japanese: 群青のファンファーレ, Hepburn: Gunjō no Fanfāre) is an original Japanese anime television series produced by Lay-duce and Aniplex. It aired from April to June 2022.

== Characters ==
=== 41st JRA Horse Racing School students ===
Yu Arimura (有村優, Arimura Yū)
Voiced by: Shōgo Yano
Shun Kazanami (風波駿, Kazanami Shun)
Voiced by: Shimba Tsuchiya
Amane Grace (天音・グレイス, Amane Gureisu)
Voiced by: Natsuki Hanae
Shūki Kyōriki (京力秋樹, Kyōriki Shūki)
Voiced by: Yōjirō Itokawa
Sojiro Sakuraba (桜庭惣司朗, Sakuraba Sōjirō)
Voiced by: Tatsumaru Tachibana
Eri Shimotsuki (霜月えり, Shimotsuki Eri)
Voiced by: Inori Minase
Hayato Hosho (宝生迅人, Hōshō Hayato)
Voiced by: Toshiyuki Toyonaga
Kota Maki (牧皐汰, Maki Kōta)
Voiced by: Chiaki Kobayashi

=== JRA Horse Racing School instructor ===
Yutaka Asahi (朝日豊, Asahi Yutaka)
Voiced by: Takahiro Sakurai
Kazuo Nohira (野平和雄, Nohira Kazuo)
Voiced by: Hiroki Tōchi

=== Mr. Doctor (Idol Group) ===
Tako Kitami (北見田子, Kitami Tako)
Voiced by: Lynn
Naoko Saionji (西園寺七緒子, Saionji Naoko)
Voiced by: Masako Katsuki
Kōsei Nanbara (南原煌成, Nanbara Kōsei)
Voiced by: Syoya Kimata
Masaki Azuma (東将基, Azuma Masaki)
Voiced by: Shosei Ohira

=== Other characters ===
Yoshihisa Kuji (久慈凱久, Kuji Yoshihisa)
Voiced by: Daisuke Namikawa
Akari Sumeragi (皇朱哩, Sumeragi Akari)
Voiced by: Yoko Hikasa
Yukino Tayasu (田安如乃, Tayasu Yukino)
Voiced by: Junya Enoki
Futoshi Kashino (樫野太, Kashino Futoshi)
Voiced by: Mitsuru Miyamoto
Miku Kashino (樫野未来, Kashino Miku)
Voiced by: Minako Kotobuki
Kazuma Hayashida (林田一馬, Hayashida Kazuma)
Voiced by: Yuichi Nakamura

== Production and release ==
The anime project was revealed on August 28, 2021, during the "BS Eleven Keiba Chūkei" program in Japan, which was teased a week prior. The series is produced by Lay-duce and Aniplex and directed by Makoto Katō, with Team Fanfare writing the series' scripts, Naohiro Fukushima serving as the main writer, Hiro Kanzaki designing the characters, and Hiroyuki Sawano composing the music. It aired from April 2 to June 25, 2022, on Tokyo MX, BS11, GTV, GYT, MBS, and AT-X. The opening theme song is "Move The Soul" by JO1, while the ending theme song is "Outsiders" by SawanoHiroyuki[nZk] with JO1 members Junki Kono and Sho Yonashiro. The series will have 13 episodes. Crunchyroll streamed the series outside of Asia. Plus Media Networks Asia licensed the series in Southeast Asia and will release it on Aniplus Asia.

=== Episode list ===
No.	Title	Directed by	Written by	Storyboarded by	Original release date
1	"First Encounter"; Transliteration: "Hajimari no Deai" (Japanese: 始まりの出会い)	Takashi Kumazen	Mehikari Ōkawa, Naohiro Fukushima	Makoto Katō	April 2, 2022 (Note: This episode was pre-screened on March 21, 2022.)
2	"Yu and Yu"; Transliteration: "Yū to Yū" (Japanese: 優と優)	Takurō Tsukada	Mehikari Ōkawa, Naohiro Fukushima	Namimi Sanjō	April 9, 2022
3	"Prince from a Distant Land"; Transliteration: "Tōi Kuni kara Kita Ōji" (Japanese: 遠い国から来た王子)	Tatsuma Minamikawa	Naohiro Fukushima	Tatsuma Minamikawa	April 16, 2022
4	"Summer Night Camp"; Transliteration: "Samā Naito Kyanpu" (Japanese: サマーナイトキャンプ)	Akira Toba	Naohiro Fukushima	Akira Toba	April 23, 2022
5	"Setting Sun"; Transliteration: "Shayō" (Japanese: 斜陽)	Takurō Tsukada	Mehikari Ōkawa	Namimi Sanjō	April 30, 2022
6	"Let Go of the Reins"; Transliteration: "Hanareta Tazuna" (Japanese: はなれた手綱)	Yasuo Ejima	Mehikari Ōkawa, Naohiro Fukushima	Yasuo Ejima	May 7, 2022
7	"The Day We Leave the Nest"; Transliteration: "Sudachi no Hi" (Japanese: 巣立ちの日)	Hazuki Mizumoto	Mehikari Ōkawa, Naohiro Fukushima	Namimi Sanjō	May 14, 2022
8	"The Ritto Wind"; Transliteration: "Rittō no Kaze" (Japanese: 栗東の風)	Takashi Kumazen	Naohiro Fukushima	Daigo Yamagishi	May 21, 2022
9	"Leap Forward, Side-by-Side!"; Transliteration: "Awasete, Tobidase!" (Japanese: 併せて、飛び出せ！)	Daiki Nakamura	Naohiro Fukushima	Namimi Sanjō	May 28, 2022
10	"The Sound of Distant Rain"; Transliteration: "Tōi Ame no Oto" (Japanese: 遠い雨の音)	Yasuo Ejima	Naohiro Fukushima	Namimi Sanjō	June 4, 2022
11	"The Morning Dew is Far"; Transliteration: "Asatsuyu wa Tōku" (Japanese: 朝露は遠く)	Takurō Tsukada	Naohiro Fukushima	Yasuo Ejima, Makoto Katō, Satomi Nakamura	June 11, 2022
12	"1700 Meters on the Dirt"; Transliteration: "Dāto Sen Nanahyaku Mētoru no Kakehiki" (Japanese: ダート1700mの駆引)	Hazuki Mizumoto	Mehikari Ōkawa, Naohiro Fukushima	Akira Nishimori, Kaoru Futaki; Makoto Katō	June 18, 2022
13	"Into the Starting Gate!"; Transliteration: "Gēto In!" (Japanese: ゲート・イン！)	Makoto Katō	Naohiro Fukushima	Makoto Katō	June 25, 2022

== Music ==
Fanfare of Adolescence (Original Soundtrack)

Soundtrack album by Hiroyuki Sawano
- Released: June 8, 2022
- Genre: Soundtrack
- Length: 74:12
- Label: Aniplex
- Producer: Hiroyuki Sawano

Hiroyuki Sawano Soundtrack albums chronology
Bubble (Original Motion Picture Soundtrack) (2022)	Fanfare of Adolescence (Original Soundtrack) (2022)	TV Anime "Attack on Titan" The Final Season (Original Soundtrack) 02 (2022)

The series' soundtrack was composed by Hiroyuki Sawano, and released on June 8, 2022, via Aniplex. The soundtrack also features several vocal tracks featuring performances by Benjamin, mpi and Misaki Umase.

=== Track listing ===
All music is composed by Hiroyuki Sawano.

Fanfare of Adolescence (Original Soundtrack) track listing
No.	Title	Lyrics	Vocals	Length
1.	"Fanfare of Adolescence"			5:54
2.	"RUSH"	Benjamin; mpi	Benjamin; mpi	3:46
3.	"WindWaveS"			4:00
4.	"1A1a"		Sawano	3:57
5.	"rideUMA"			3:46
6.	"group-BLUE"			3:40
7.	"Blue[3-6]"		Sawano	4:06
8.	"c-RUSH"			4:13
9.	"K8school"			3:46
10.	"Roads to Ride"	cAnON.	Misaki Umase	2:25
11.	"1o-2oby"			3:28
12.	"RE-Fanfan"			3:26
13.	"<202204>"			4:00
14.	"J0c鍵"			2:54
15.	"追うしTHE"			3:34
16.	"RUSH <verBand>"	Benjamin; mpi	Benjamin; mpi	1:17
17.	"GF-PF1"			2:26
18.	"GF-PF2"			1:25
19.	"GF-PF3"			2:43
20.	"4ゅN"			3:53
21.	"JD-FANFARE"			2:23
22.	"Walk for Dream"	Benjamin; cAnON.	Benjamin; mpi	3:10
Total length:				74:12

== Reception ==
Fanfare of Adolescence has received generally mixed to negative reviews from critics. Teddy Cambosa of Anime Corner criticized the show's lack of focus on the horse racing aspects of the show as well as the writing of the storytelling and characters, calling it "All Idols, No Horse-Racing." Nicholas Dupree of Anime News Network shared similar sentiments, with him naming the show as the worst of the season it aired, stating "there's nothing about it I could describe as "good" outside of some isolated visuals courtesy of its talented director." Natsuki Hanae's acting also received criticism, with Teddy Cambosa of Anime Corner calling it "overwhelming" and Gracie Qu of Anitrendz describing it as "unnatural" due to him acting a character that was supposed to be a bilingual.
