= Magi: Adventure of Sinbad =

Japanese manga series

- First tankōbon volume cover

マギ シンドバッドの冒険 (Magi Shindobaddo no Bōken)
- Genre: Adventure, fantasy
- Manga
- Written by: Shinobu Ohtaka
- Illustrated by: Yoshifumi Ohtera
- Published by: Shogakukan
- English publisher: SG: Shogakukan Asia
- Imprint: Ura Sunday Comics
- Magazine: Weekly Shōnen Sunday; (May 18 – June 26, 2013); Ura Sunday; MangaONE; (September 17, 2013 – April 25, 2018)
- Original run: May 18, 2013 – April 25, 2018
- Volumes: 19
- Original video animation
- Directed by: Yoshikazu Miyao
- Produced by: Shunsuke Saitō; Kazuaki Ishibashi; Noritomo Yoreuchi
- Written by: Taku Kishimoto
- Music by: Tomohiro Ōkubo
- Studio: Lay-duce
- Released: May 16, 2014 – July 15, 2015
- Runtime: 24–28 minutes (each)
- Episodes: 5
- Anime television series
- Directed by: Yoshikazu Miyao
- Produced by: Junya Okamoto; Shunsuke Saitō; Toshihiro Maeda; Noritomo Yoreuchi
- Written by: Taku Kishimoto
- Music by: Tomohiro Ōkubo
- Studio: Lay-duce
- Licensed by: Netflix (streaming rights; expired)
- Original network: MBS, TBS, CBC TV, BS-TBS
- Original run: April 23, 2016 – July 2, 2016
- Episodes: 13
- icon

Magi: Adventure of Sinbad (Japanese: マギ シンドバッドの冒険, Hepburn: Magi Shindobaddo no Bōken) is a Japanese manga series written by Shinobu Ohtaka and illustrated by Yoshifumi Ohtera. It is a spin-off and a prequel to Magi: The Labyrinth of Magic. It was first serialized in Shogakukan's Weekly Shōnen Sunday from May to June 2013, before being moved to Shogakukan's website Ura Sunday (also later available on the MangaONE app) in September of the same year and published until April 2018. Its chapters were collected in 19 tankōbon volumes.

The manga was adapted into a five-episode original video animation (OVA) produced by Lay-duce, released from May 2014 to July 2015 bundled with some volumes of the manga. A 13-episode anime television series adaptation, by the same staff from the OVA, was broadcast from April to July 2016.

== Plot ==
Many abnormal things start occurring around the world, with magicians noticing the birth of a certain child. Badr, a war veteran helps his wife Esra successfully birth their child; a future King and the special First-Class Singularity.

Living in the Parthevia Empire with his father Badr and his mother Esra, Sinbad spends his childhood living in discrimination due to the fact that his father avoids going to war against the Reim Empire that all men of Parthevia must go to. Authorities come and take Badr by force, and Sinbad unfortunately loses his father due to the war against the Reim Empire, and spends his youth helping the local villagers and tending to his ill mother. One day, he meets and shelters a mysterious man named Yunan, unaware that he is a Magi. By the request of his mother and learning of his determination to change the world for the better, Yunan decides to guide Sinbad and instructs him to challenge the Dungeon "Baal" that appeared in the border between Partevia and Reim, and whose treasures were still unclaimed as thousands of warriors from both empires had challenged it, but none of them survived, except by Sinbad himself and a Parthevian noble whom he nicknamed "Drakon". After defeating Drakon in battle, Sinbad conquers Baal and gains the allegiance of the Djinn residing there, thus becoming the first ever Dungeon Capturer. Sinbad returns home in time to have one last encounter with his mother at her deathbed and leaves Parthevia to start his own journey to change the world.

Sinbad sets off to sea after an encounter with Cerendine, a general from Parthevia after a brief battle. He throws her into the sea leaving her in a barrel and starts to head toward Imuchakk. After meeting Hinahoho and his sister, and defeating a sea monster with them, he arrives at Imuchakk with the two. Hinahoho was able to get his name, since in Imuchakk the inhabitants are nameless until they pass the coming of age ceremony. As everyone falls asleep at the end of the ceremony, Sinbad is surprise attacked by an assassin of Parthevia's Sham Lash, Ja'far. After a brief battle, Sinbad fends him off and angers Ja'far, and he retreats. Hinahoho on the other hand, is upset that he took all the credit for Sinbad's work for defeating the sea monster. As self atonement and a true method of earning his name, he decides to capture the nearby dungeon in Imuchakk; Valefor.

== Media ==
=== Manga ===
Magi: Adventure of Sinbad is written by Shinobu Ohtaka and illustrated by Yoshifumi Ohtera. A 70-page prototype manga was released with the first limited Blu-ray released of the Magi: The Labyrinth of Magic anime series. It was later expanded into a serialized manga, which was published in Shogakukan's Weekly Shōnen Sunday from May 18 to June 26, 2013. It was then transferred over to Shogakukan's webcomic site Ura Sunday (also available later on the MangaONE app), being published from September 18, 2013, to April 25, 2018. (Note: The series finished on MangaONE on April 25, 2018, and on Ura Sunday a week later on May 2.) Shogakukan collected its chapters in 19 tankōbon volumes, released from September 18, 2013, to July 19, 2018.

Shogakukan Asia published the first four volumes of the manga in English in Southeast Asia from December 2014 to March 2016.

==== Volumes ====
No.	Japanese release date	Japanese ISBN
1	September 18, 2013	978-4-09-124390-4
2	January 17, 2014	978-4-09-124596-0
3	May 16, 2014; May 14, 2014 (SE)	978-4-09-124692-9; 978-4-09-941827-4 (SE)
4	August 18, 2014; August 12, 2014 (SE)	978-4-09-125219-7; 978-4-09-941835-9 (SE)
5	December 18, 2014; December 16, 2014 (SE)	978-4-09-125548-8; 978-4-09-941848-9 (SE)
6	April 17, 2015; April 15, 2015 (SE)	978-4-09-126037-6; 978-4-09-941856-4 (SE)
7	July 17, 2015; July 15, 2015 (SE)	978-4-09-126266-0; 978-4-09-941858-8 (SE)
8	October 16, 2015	978-4-09-126590-6
9	April 12, 2016	978-4-09-127225-6
10	May 18, 2016	978-4-09-127263-8
11	November 18, 2016	978-4-09-127395-6
12	January 18, 2017	978-4-09-127443-4
13	April 18, 2017	978-4-09-127590-5
14	June 16, 2017	978-4-09-127645-2
15	August 18, 2017	978-4-09-127756-5
16	November 17, 2017	978-4-09-128024-4
17	February 19, 2018	978-4-09-128167-8
18	July 19, 2018	978-4-09-128427-3
19	July 19, 2018	978-4-09-128428-0

=== Anime ===
An original video animation (OVA) produced by Lay-duce was announced in January 2014. It was directed by Yoshikazu Miyao, with Taku Kishimoto serving as the series composition and Soichiro Sako handling the character designs. The first episode was released with the manga's third special edition volume on May 16, 2014. The second episode was released with the manga's fourth special edition volume on August 18, 2014. The third episode was released with the fifth volume on December 18, 2014. The fourth episode was released with the manga's sixth special edition volume on April 15, 2015. The fifth and final episode was released with the manga's seventh special edition volume on July 15, 2015.

An anime television series was announced in September 2015 with the same staff from the OVA series. It was scheduled to begin airing on April 15, 2016, in the Animeism programming block; however, due to breaking news regarding the Kumamoto earthquake that hit the Kumamoto Prefecture in Japan on April 14, 2016, it was delayed. Instead, it began airing on April 23. The opening theme is "Spotlight", performed by Penguin Research, and the ending theme is "Polaris", performed by Fujifabric.

==== OVA episodes ====
No.	Title	Original release date
1	"The Capture of Dungeon Baal – Part One"; Transliteration: "Danjon Baaru Kōryaku-hen – Zenpen" (Japanese: 迷宮（ダンジョン）バアル攻略篇・前篇)	May 16, 2014
2	"The Capture of Dungeon Baal – Part Two"; Transliteration: "Danjon Baaru Kōryaku-hen – Kōhen" (Japanese: 迷宮（ダンジョン）バアル攻略篇・後篇)	August 18, 2014
3	"The Capture of Dungeon Valefor – Part One"; Transliteration: "Meikyū Varefōru Kōryaku-hen – Zenpen" (Japanese: 迷宮ブァレフォール攻略篇・前篇)	December 18, 2014
4	"The Capture of Dungeon Valefor – Part Two"; Transliteration: "Meikyū Varefōru Kōryaku-hen – Chuuhen" (Japanese: 迷宮ブァレフォール攻略篇・中篇)	April 15, 2015
5	"The Capture of Dungeon Valefor – Part Three"; Transliteration: "Meikyū Varefōru Kōryaku-hen – Kouhen" (Japanese: 迷宮ブァレフォール攻略篇・後篇)	July 15, 2015

==== TV series episodes ====
No.	Title	Original release date
1	"Child of Destiny"; Transliteration: "Unmei no ko" (Japanese: 運命の子)	April 23, 2016 (Note: The first episode was scheduled to begin airing on April 15, 2016; however, due to breaking news regarding the Kumamoto earthquake that hit the Kumamoto Prefecture in Japan on April 14, 2016, it was delayed.)
2	"Sinbad the Sailor"; Transliteration: "Funanori Sinbad" (Japanese: 船乗りシンドバッド)	April 23, 2016
3	"Dungeon Baal"; Transliteration: "Meikyuu Baal" (Japanese: 迷宮バアル)	April 30, 2016
4	"First Sea"; Transliteration: "Hitotsume no Umi" (Japanese: ひとつめの海)	May 7, 2016
5	"Qualities of a King"; Transliteration: "Ou no Shishitsu" (Japanese: 王の資質)	May 14, 2016
6	"Place Where You Belong"; Transliteration: "Ibasho" (Japanese: 居場所)	May 21, 2016
7	"Sinbad the Merchant"; Transliteration: "Shounin Sinbad" (Japanese: 商人シンドバッド)	May 28, 2016
8	"Household Vessel"; Transliteration: "Kenzokuki" (Japanese: 眷属器)	June 4, 2016
9	"Sasan, the Land of Purity"; Transliteration: "Seijou no Chi Sasan" (Japanese: 清浄の地ササン)	June 11, 2016
10	"The Power to Change the World"; Transliteration: "Sekai wo Kaeru Chikara" (Japanese: 世界を変える力)	June 18, 2016
11	"Artemyra, the City in the Sky"; Transliteration: "Tenkuu Toshi Artemyra" (Japanese: 天空都市アルテミュラ)	June 25, 2016
12	"Djinn Equip vs Djinn Equip"; Transliteration: "Masou vs Masou" (Japanese: 魔装 vs 魔装)	July 2, 2016
13	"Magi"; Transliteration: "Magi" (Japanese: マギ)	July 2, 2016
