= Tomo-chan Is a Girl! =

Japanese manga series

- First tankōbon volume cover, featuring Tomo Aizawa (left) and Junichiro Kubota (right)

トモちゃんは女の子！ (Tomo-chan wa Onnanoko!)
- Genre: Romantic comedy; Slice of life
- Manga
- Written by: Fumita Yanagida
- Published by: Seikaisha
- English publisher: NA: Seven Seas Entertainment
- Magazine: Saizensen
- Original run: April 7, 2015 – July 14, 2019
- Volumes: 8
- Anime television series
- Directed by: Hitoshi Nanba
- Written by: Megumi Shimizu
- Music by: Masaru Yokoyama
- Studio: Lay-duce
- Licensed by: Crunchyroll
- Original network: Tokyo MX, BS11, GTV, GYT, MBS
- English network: US: Crunchyroll Channel
- Original run: January 5, 2023 – March 30, 2023
- Episodes: 13
- icon

Tomo-chan Is a Girl! (Japanese: トモちゃんは女の子！, Hepburn: Tomo-chan wa Onnanoko!) is a Japanese four-panel manga series written and illustrated by Fumita Yanagida. It was serialized on the Twi4 Twitter account and Saizensen website, usually as a single-page four-panel strip, from April 2015 to July 2019. Seikaisha published in eight tankōbon volumes. An anime television series adaptation produced by Lay-duce aired from January to March 2023.

The manga follows the everyday life of a tomboy high school student who is in love with her childhood friend, who only treats her as a boy, and her attempts to make him reciprocate her unrequited love.

== Plot ==
Tomo Aizawa is a tomboy who has been head-over-heels in love with her childhood best friend Junichiro Kubota for a long time, even though he only sees her as "one of the boys" and has no romantic feelings for her at all. Hilarity ensues when she tries many times in vain to win his heart, but almost always fails and even ends up getting physical at times.

== Characters ==
Tomo Aizawa (相沢 智, Aizawa Tomo)
Voiced by: Rie Takahashi (Japanese); Lexi Nieto, Emi Lo (young) (English)
Tomo is a tomboy who excels in combat sports. She is deeply in love with her childhood friend Junichiro, even though she struggles to win his heart. She is self-conscious about her "masculine" personality and seeks to become more "feminine". She reflexively hits Junichiro whenever he does anything that could be perceived as physically intimate. She is in the school's karate club (all boys except for her), after not wanting to be further influenced by her father's personality during fights.^{Vol. 1}
Junichiro Kubota (久保田 淳一郎, Kubota Jun'ichirō)
Voiced by: Kaito Ishikawa, Makoto Koichi (young) (Japanese); Ricco Fajardo, Dani Chambers (young) (English)
The handsome childhood friend whom Tomo is in love with. However, he only sees her as one of the boys, much to Tomo's frustration. He and Tomo are neighbors, with them first meeting when Junichiro moved into Tomo's neighborhood. However, they went to different elementary schools. He has been regularly training with Tomo's father's dojo, so he does not participate in any athletic programs at school. He feels a bit jealous whenever Tomo gives attention to other guys. He and Misuzu do not get along,^{Vol. 1} having dated for three days back in middle school.^{Vol. 2}
Misuzu Gundou (群堂 みすず, Gundō Misuzu)
Voiced by: Rina Hidaka (Japanese); Jad Saxton, Jalitza Delgado (young) (English)
Tomo's best female friend, she is petite with dark hair in a side ponytail. Although she sometimes plays the straight man complement to Tomo and Junichiro, she is also very cunning and sadistic, often showing a devilish grin to Junichiro. She likes to mess with the two, even telling classmate Tanabe that she is the only one who is allowed to play with them. Although she knows Tomo likes Junichiro, she does not like that they progress their relationship for fear of losing her friend to him.^{Vol. 1-2}
Carol Olston (キャロル・オールストン, Kyaroru Ōrusuton)
Voiced by: Sally Amaki (Japanese and English)
The school idol, she comes from a wealthy family, is of British descent, and has light blonde hair and a busty figure.^{Vol. 1} Although she acts like an airhead and a free spirit, she is later revealed to be an excellent student, even topping exams. She is a childhood friend and distant relative of Kōsuke, whom she says they have been engaged to and married three times over. Her mother was a young teenager when she gave birth to her. Tomo calls her cotton candy.^{Vol. 1}
Kousuke Misaki (御崎 光助, Misaki Kōsuke; also Kōsuke)
Voiced by: Kōhei Amasaki (Japanese); Ciarán Strange (English)
An upperclassman to Tomo and friends, he is the captain of the karate club and regarded as the school prince.^{Vol. 2} He admires Tomo as an athlete and club member. He has a rocky relationship with his childhood friend and distant relative Carol, whom the latter says they are engaged.^{Vol. 1}
Mifune (三船) and Ogawa (小川)
Mifune: Voiced by: Yō Taichi (Japanese); Marisa Duran (English)
Ogawa: Voiced by: Atsumi Tanezaki (Japanese); Natalie Hoover (English)
A pair of gyaru schoolgirls from class B. Mifune has light brown hair, parted bangs, and a short ponytail; Ogawa has short blonde hair pulled back in the middle and a dark complexion. They both have a crush on Misaki, and try to call out Tomo to stay away from him, but after Tomo sees they like Misaki, she wants to support them as friends.^{Vol. 1}
Tatsumi Tanabe (田辺 達巳, Tanabe Tatsumi)
Voiced by: Yoshitsugu Matsuoka (Japanese); Christopher Llewyn Ramirez (English)
Another classmate of the trio. He has a crush on Misuzu, but is always rebuffed by her.^{Vol. 1}
Gorō Aizawa (相沢 五郎, Aizawa Gorō)
Voiced by: Kenji Nomura (Japanese); Cris George (English)
Tomo's father is a karate instructor who has trained both Tomo and Junichiro, hoping they can take over the family business. He has an intense personality around the kids, but not so much when with his wife. He is the reason why Tomo cannot show her feminine side.^{Vol. 1}
Akemi Aizawa (相沢 あけみ, Aizawa Akemi)
Voiced by: Kumiko Watanabe (Japanese); Luci Christian (English)
Tomo's mother, whom she resembles, although looks more tomboyish. She likes teasing her husband and daughter.

== Media ==
=== Manga ===
Tomo-chan Is a Girl!, written and illustrated by Fumita Yanagida, was serialized on the Twi4 Twitter account and on the Saizensen website from April 7, 2015, to July 14, 2019. Seikaisha published the individual chapters in eight tankōbon volumes.

In February 2018, Seven Seas Entertainment announced they licensed the series for an English release.

==== Volumes ====
No.	Original release date	Original ISBN	English release date	English ISBN
1	October 9, 2015	978-4-06-369537-3	September 11, 2018	978-1-62-692910-4
Chapters 1–8. Covers manga posts on Twitter and the Saizensen website from April to August 2015.
Tomo Aizawa confesses her love to her childhood friend Junichiro Kubota, but Junichiro replies that he likes her too as a bro. Whenever he touches her in a somewhat affectionate manner, she reacts violently and hits him. She asks her best friend Misuzu Gundou for advice. She tries to grow her hair out. She gets pulled into taking a photo booth picture with him. Their classmate Tatsumi Tanabe asks Junichiro what kind of relationship he and Tomo have. When Junichiro and Misuzu both forget their umbrellas on a rainy day, they wait to see who Tomo will pair up with. Kousuke Misaki, the karate club captain, is fond of having Tomo on the team. Mifune and Ogawa call out Tomo because she was seen with Kousuke. Tomo thinks it is a challenge to fight, but they tell her they like Kousuke, so she feels flattered they are going to her for love advice and supports them. When a stranger gropes Tomo on the bus, Junichiro stops the man, and later tells Tomo she should stop wearing skirts and wear slacks instead. When Tomo vents to Misuzu about it, Misuzu takes away Tomo's spats and see how Junichiro reacts with her wearing a skirt that could expose her panties. Carol Olston, the school idol from Britain and Kousuke's childhood friend and fiancée, pokes Tomo and calls her a dummy. She has Junichiro help her train to fight an unnamed rival, but after seeing that Junichiro and Tomo know each other, abandons the training, and becomes friends with Misuzu and Tomo instead. Junichiro and Tomo overhear their classmates talking about the popularity of the guys and girls at school but get bothered when Tomo and Junichiro are rated, respectively.
2	February 4, 2016	978-4-06-369544-1	December 4, 2018	978-1-62-692969-2
Chapters 9–17. Covers manga posts on Twitter and the Saizensen website from August to December 2015.
3	July 9, 2016	978-4-06-369552-6	March 12, 2019	978-1-64-275015-7
Chapters 18–23. Covers manga posts on Twitter and the Saizensen website from February to June 2016.
4	January 26, 2017	978-4-06-369562-5	July 9, 2019	978-1-64-275109-3
Chapters 24–31. Covers manga posts on Twitter and the Saizensen website from July to November 2016.
5	August 10, 2017	978-4-06-369579-3	October 22, 2019	978-1-64-275714-9
Chapters 32–37. Covers manga posts on Twitter and the Saizensen website from January to July 2017.
6	February 10, 2018	978-4-06-511152-9	January 7, 2020	978-1-64-505192-3
Chapters 38–41. Covers manga posts on Twitter and the Saizensen website from July to December 2017.
7	September 12, 2018	978-4-06-513113-8	June 16, 2020	978-1-64-505459-7
Chapters 42–46. Covers manga posts on Twitter and the Saizensen website from February to August 2018.
8	September 12, 2019	978-4-06-516696-3	September 22, 2020	978-1-64-505744-4
Chapters 47–51. Covers manga posts on Twitter and the Saizensen website from September 2018 to July 2019.

=== Anime ===
An anime television series adaptation was announced at Anime Expo in July 2022. It was produced by Lay-duce and directed by Hitoshi Nanba, with assistant direction from Noriko Hashimoto, scripts written by Megumi Shimizu, character designs handled by Shiori Hiraiwa, and music composed by Masaru Yokoyama. The 13-episode series aired from January 5 to March 30, 2023, on Tokyo MX and other networks. (Note: Tokyo MX listed the series premiere at 24:30 on January 4, 2023, which is effectively January 5 at 12:30 a.m. JST.) The opening theme song is "Kurae! Telepathy" (くらえ！テレパシー, Kurae! Terepashī) by Maharajan. Rie Takahashi, Rina Hidaka, and Sally Amaki performed the first ending theme song "yurukuru＊love" for Episodes 2–9 and 11–13, while Kaito Ishikawa, Kōhei Amasaki, and Yoshitsugu Matsuoka performed the second ending theme song "Jiribaki_love" for Episode 10. Crunchyroll co-produced the series and streamed it along with an English dub.

==== Episodes ====
No.	Title (Note: All English titles are taken from Crunchyroll.)	Directed by	Written by	Storyboarded by	Original release date
1	"I Want to Be Seen as a Girl!"; Transliteration: "Onnanoko ni Miraretai!" (Japanese: 女の子に見られたい！)	Makoto Sokuza	Megumi Shimizu	Namimi Sanjō	January 5, 2023
1	"A Terrifying Challenge"; Transliteration: "Senritsu no Chōsenjō" (Japanese: 戦慄の挑戦状)	Makoto Sokuza	Megumi Shimizu	Namimi Sanjō	January 5, 2023
Tomo Aizawa, a tomboy, unsuccessfully confesses her love to her childhood friend Junichiro Kubota. Later on, after Tomo asks her best friend Misuzu Gundou for advice, she tries to change the way she talks with Junichiro, but they instead fight. Sometime later, both Junichiro and Misuzu forget their umbrellas and wait for Tomo to walk them home. Junichiro angrily pushes Misuzu into the rain after she teases him before he and Tomo depart together at Misuzu's suggestion. Tomo bolts away after Junichiro comes close to prevent her from getting wet, and he does the same thing after he accidentally sees her soaked clothes. Tomo attends the boys' karate club, much to the admiration of captain Kosuke Misaki. When she asks him for advice, a flustered Kosuke exclaims she is charming the way she is. Later on, two girls, Mifune and Ogawa, try to approach Kosuke after school, but they see him with Tomo. When they approach Tomo, she mistakenly believes they are challenging her to fight. After Misuzu explains the situation to Tomo, they meet behind the gym, where the terrified pair tell Tomo they like Kosuke. An excited Tomo then promises to help them.
2	"Tomo's Skirt"; Transliteration: "Tomo no Sukāto" (Japanese: トモのスカート)	Shigeru Fukase	Megumi Shimizu	Noriko Hashimoto	January 12, 2023
2	"The School's Idol"; Transliteration: "Gakuen no Aidoru" (Japanese: 学園のアイドル)	Shigeru Fukase	Megumi Shimizu	Noriko Hashimoto	January 12, 2023
After Tomo gets groped by an old man on the bus, Junichiro restrains him and later suggests that she wear slacks instead of a skirt. When she vents her frustration to Misuzu, Misuzu takes Tomo's shorts away after school so Tomo will only be wearing a skirt when she and Junichiro walk home together. Tomo feels incredibly self-conscious while Junichiro tries not to look at her. The next day, Misuzu guesses from Tomo's reaction that Junichiro saw her differently. Carol Olston, an English classmate, is popular with the boys. After Tomo runs into Carol and Kosuke in the hallway, Carol begins to see her as a rival. Misuzu sends Carol to Junichiro, giving Tomo the motivation to go after him. Meanwhile, Junichiro only knows that Carol wants to train to take on an unnamed rival, and tries to help her with basic physical training. When Tomo finally confronts Junichiro, Carol abruptly leaves. After school, when Carol takes Misuzu out to a pastry shop, Misuzu convinces her to make friends with Tomo. Carol is surprised the next day at school when Tomo accepts unconditionally. Later, Tomo is stunned when Junichiro inadvertently reveals he dated Misuzu in middle school.
3	"Best Bud's Secret"; Transliteration: "Shinyū no Himitsu" (Japanese: 親友の秘密)	Masahiko Suzuki	Megumi Shimizu	Tomoe Makino	January 19, 2023
3	"Let's Go on a Date!"; Transliteration: "Dēto Shiyō ze!" (Japanese: デートしようぜ！)	Masahiko Suzuki	Megumi Shimizu	Noriko Hashimoto	January 19, 2023
When a furious Tomo confronts Misuzu, Misuzu reveals their relationship lasted a mere three days. Later on, Tomo becomes happy when Junichiro tells her he has no current love interest. The next day, Junichiro meets Kosuke. Realizing he is Tomo's senpai in the karate club, Junichiro treats him harshly out of jealousy. Later that day, as Junichiro rides the bus with Kosuke, the latter discovers that despite being rough amongst themselves, Junichiro deeply admires Tomo. However, Junichiro again intimidates Kosuke the next day when he attempts to tell Tomo about their conversation. In a café, Misuzu tells Tomo that she should take Junichiro on a date. Once Junichiro excitedly accepts, Tomo receives help in buying clothes from Misuzu and Carol. The next day, she shows up to the date in her new attire. They attend their usual spots, these being a batting cage and a bowling alley. However, she gathers the courage to take him to a karaoke box, but ends up singing children's songs. The next day, as an embarrassed Tomo attempts to stop Misuzu and Carol from seeing her video, Junichiro notices Tomo appeared different that day. Tomo then returns to the karaoke with the girls.
4	"The Reason for Her Smile"; Transliteration: "Egao no Riyū" (Japanese: 笑顔の理由)	Ken Andō	Megumi Shimizu	Namimi Sanjō	January 26, 2023
4	"I Want to Be Playful Like a Girl"; Transliteration: "Joshippoku Tawamuretai" (Japanese: 女子っぽく戯れたい)	Ken Andō	Megumi Shimizu	Namimi Sanjō	January 26, 2023
4	"Heroes Fall a Lot"; Transliteration: "Hīrō wa Yoku Korobu" (Japanese: ヒーローはよく転ぶ)	Ken Andō	Megumi Shimizu	Namimi Sanjō	January 26, 2023
Tatsumi tries to make Misuzu smile, though she resists his efforts. Tomo wants to be playful "like a girl" and begins hugging various girls in her class. Misuzu begins to grow jealous seeing Carol get clingy with Tomo. Tomo later tries the same move on Junichiro, but he sees it as childish. Junichiro comes to visit Tomo at her house and learns a bit more about her parents. Carol gives Tomo her headband while she has lunch with Misuzu, and Kosuke shows up to encourage Misuzu to stay friends with Carol. Mifune and Ogawa ask for Tomo's help after school to turn down a creepy senior, and Tomo ends up kicking him across the yard. When he plans to get revenge on Tomo, Junichiro overhears the senior's plans and beats him up along with his friends, forcing them all to apologize to Tomo the next time they see her.
5	"The Girls of the Olston Family"; Transliteration: "Ōrusuton-ke no Onna-tachi" (Japanese: オールストン家の女たち)	Makoto Sokuza	Megumi Shimizu	Noriko Hashimoto	February 2, 2023
5	"A Feeling I Won't Give Up"; Transliteration: "Yuzurenai Omoi" (Japanese: 譲れない想い)	Makoto Sokuza	Megumi Shimizu	Noriko Hashimoto	February 2, 2023
5	"Heart-Pounding! A Gaming Overnighter"; Transliteration: "Dokidoki! Gēmu Gasshuku" (Japanese: ドキドキ！ゲーム合宿)	Makoto Sokuza	Megumi Shimizu	Noriko Hashimoto	February 2, 2023
Carol invites Tomo and Misuzu to her house, which turns out to be a giant mansion with a maze-like front yard. Carol's mother, Ferris, seems almost as airheaded as her daughter, but has suspicions about Misuzu's motives. Carol easily beats both Tomo and Misuzu at Othello. With midterm exams coming up, Misuzu invites Tomo and Carol to come to her house to study. The other girls meet Misuzu's mother, Misaki, who bears a strong resemblance to her daughter. Likewise, Misaki confuses Tomo for her mother Akemi at first. The three study for the exams, with Tomo understanding Carol's odd explanations better than Misuzu's methods. After the exams, Tomo and Junichiro show small improvements in their scores, with Carol mocking Misuzu for finishing second, as she got the highest score. Junichiro invites Tomo to his house to play video games. Tomo later realizes the implication of going to Junichiro's house overnight by herself, but Misuzu, Carol, and her parents all encourage her to go anyway. Tomo struggles to reconcile her new feelings for Junichiro with their established friendship throughout the night, but the next day at school, feels that they grew closer together.
6	"Birthday Present"; Transliteration: "Bāsudē Purezento" (Japanese: バースデープレゼント)	Tomonori Mine	Kazuki Nishitani	Hitoyuki Matsui	February 9, 2023
6	"Burn Up! The Ball Sports Tournament"; Transliteration: "Moero! Kyūgi Taikai" (Japanese: 燃えろ！球技大会)	Tomonori Mine	Kazuki Nishitani	Hitoyuki Matsui	February 9, 2023
Tomo receives a wide range of birthday presents from her friends. Misuzu and Carol invite Tomo to Misuzu's house, where they proceed to give her a complete makeover. They then make Tomo buy ice cream at a local convenience store while still dolled up. Tomo feels embarrassed after spotting Junichiro at the same store, and trips over her new heeled shoes on the way out. Junichiro helps her up and walks to a park with her, not realizing that the girl is Tomo, even after she responds to subtle questions about their relationship. Tomo finally returns to Misuzu's house, discovering that Misuzu and Carol set up a surprise party for her birthday. Tomo is preparing for an upcoming school dodgeball tournament, but because of her incredible strength, she is put on the same boys team as Junichiro. The two of them manage to fight their way to the finals, and defeat the enemy team led by a gorilla-like judo student named Goma for the trophy. After the match, Junichiro reflects on how much he looks up to Tomo.
7	"Junichiro's Promise"; Transliteration: "Junichirō no Chikai" (Japanese: 淳一郎の誓い)	Shin'ya Kawabe	Megumi Shimizu	Tomoko Akiyama	February 16, 2023
7	"When Tomo Puts On a Swimsuit..."; Transliteration: "Tomo ga Mizugi ni Kigaetara" (Japanese: トモが水着に着替えたら)	Shin'ya Kawabe	Megumi Shimizu	Ichizō Kobayashi	February 16, 2023
Junichiro flashes back to when he first met Tomo. His family moved into town from Tokyo, and he preferred playing video games, when Tomo leaped over the wall to meet her new neighbor and played with his handheld console. However, Tomo ended up breaking it in half. Tomo and her parents then apologized to Junichiro personally. The replacement handheld was later stolen by some bullies. Tomo beat them up and got the handheld back, but Junichiro let Tomo keep it, claiming he would take it back when he proved he was strong enough to stand up with Tomo. Tomo continues playing said handheld in the present, wondering when Junichiro will come to take it back. Tomo and her friends head to the beach where Tomo tries to get closer to Junichiro by putting on a swimsuit. However, Junichiro cannot bring himself to say that they are a couple, even while defending her from a pushy guy trying to hit on her. Misuzu encourages Tomo to continue staying close with Junichiro to create more opportunities to upgrade their relationship. On the train ride home, Misuzu thinks her plan succeeded.
8	"The Night of the Summer Festival"; Transliteration: "Natsumatsuri no Yoru" (Japanese: 夏祭りの夜)	Takurō Tsukada	Megumi Shimizu	Ichizō Kobayashi	February 23, 2023
8	"The Distance Between Them"; Transliteration: "Futari no Kyorikan" (Japanese: 二人の距離感)	Shun Komamiya	Megumi Shimizu	Shun Komamiya	February 23, 2023
Tomo is challenged by Misuzu to attend the upcoming fireworks festival with Junichiro. She nervously asks him to go with her, and he agrees. While Misuzu, Carol, and Kosuke hang out, Tomo wins all the prizes in a shooting game, where the operator alerts all the stall managers, sending them a picture of Tomo, now unrecognizable in a yukata. Junichiro takes Tomo to a special spot to watch the fireworks and she thinks of confessing again. Meanwhile, Junichiro recalls Tomo's previous confession, convincing himself that she was not being serious. The gang targets Misuzu to get back at Tomo. Her demonic aura initially scares them, but she says Carol is not her friend to spare her. Upset, Carol tazes the gang leader and a chase ensues. While hiding, Misuzu calls Junichiro, with Tomo following. They defeat the gang, while Misuzu apologizes to Carol. Kosuke arrives and seeing Carol in underwear while changing her clothes, misinterprets the situation. Misuzu later blackmails the gang into becoming their bodyguards, which they do after learning Tomo is Goro's daughter. The next day, Junichiro joyfully holds Tomo to walk to school, delighting her.
9	"The Angel's True Face"; Transliteration: "Tenshi no Sugao" (Japanese: 天使の素顔)	Hisashi Isogawa	Megumi Shimizu	Yutaka Hirata	March 2, 2023
A flashback reveals the moment Kosuke first met and became enamored with Carol. In the present, Kosuke enrolls into Goro's dojo, becoming overwhelmed. When asked by Tomo why did he enter, he reveals he wants to become stronger for Carol's sake. The next day, Carol mistakenly believes Kosuke is attracted to Tomo, so she goes into Junichiro's house to make him jealous. Once this works, Kosuke finally reveals his love for Carol to Misuzu, explaining he has been unable to tell her due to having never seen her vulnerable. To help him, Misuzu makes some painful comments regarding Kosuke's interest for her to Carol, making her flee the school, crying. Realizing her mistake, Misuzu sends Kosuke to Carol's home. There, he tells Carol about Misuzu's lie, and finally confesses his love. Delighted, she accepts Kosuke's confession, and her mother trusts Carol to him after he promises she will not change the way she is as she now has friends. The next day, Carol gets back at Misuzu by scaring her.
10	"How the Contest Ends"; Transliteration: "Shōbu no Yukue" (Japanese: 勝負の行方)	Hazuki Mizumoto	Kazuki Nishitani	Namimi Sanjō	March 9, 2023
10	"To Stay Best Friends..."; Transliteration: "Shinyū de Iru Tame ni......" (Japanese: 親友でいるために……)	Hazuki Mizumoto	Kazuki Nishitani	Namimi Sanjō	March 9, 2023
Tomo and Junichiro are excited to run in their school's marathon. The two of them easily race past the rest of their class, but on the way back, Tomo collapses from exhaustion, revealing that she also ran for hours the night before. Junichiro carries her piggyback style to the school nurse, where Misuzu suggests that she should take advantage to appear more vulnerable to Junichiro. Tomo eventually convinces Junichiro to carry her again so her mother can drive her to the hospital. When Junichiro later visits Tomo, she gives him back his handheld from years ago, claiming that he finally caught up to her in physical prowess. Junichiro flashes back to his middle school days, reminiscing about his relationship with both Tomo and Misuzu.
11	"My First Part-Time Job"; Transliteration: "Hajimete no Arubaito" (Japanese: 初めてのアルバイト)	Daiki Nakamura	Megumi Shimizu	Mamoru Sasaki	March 16, 2023
11	"The Abandoned Cinderella"; Transliteration: "Oitekebori no Shinderera" (Japanese: 置いてけぼりのシンデレラ)	Daiki Nakamura	Megumi Shimizu	Mamoru Sasaki	March 16, 2023
Tomo gets a part-time job at a ramen shop owned by Tatsumi's family, with Misuzu as a waitress and Carol playing a mascot. Misuzu and Tomo are both shocked to see Junichiro visit, but Junichiro's compliments raise Tomo's spirits. At the end of the weekend, all three girls get extra pay for their exceptional work. Tomo uses the money to buy Junichiro a birthday present and some cake. Junichiro suggests they eat it at her house. Tomo asks Misuzu for advice on getting closer to Junichiro, so she sets a trap to push him down the stairs and have Tomo catch him. However, he dodges at the last second and stumbles into Carol instead. Misuzu starts to feel guilty about getting between Tomo and Junichiro and takes multiple sick days. Tomo decides to take the initiative and visit Misuzu at home, giving her a copy of the script for their class play, Cinderella. Misuzu shows up the next day, angry that she was cast as the lead by Carol without her knowledge, while Tomo was cast as the Prince, Carol as the evil stepmother, and Junichiro as a tree.
12	"Goodbye, Best Friend"; Transliteration: "Sayonara, Shinyū" (Japanese: さよなら、親友)	Makoto Sokuza	Megumi Shimizu	Hajime Asagaya	March 23, 2023
During the play, Misuzu has a good time in her performance after she can get close to Tomo. After the festival, Junichiro and Tomo dance together next to the bonfire, where he hints heavily he likes her. However, Tomo runs away, and over the following days, she hangs out with him normally, but gets flustered when Junichiro brings back the subject. In school, Junichiro reveals his love for Tomo to Kosuke, who encourages him to confess. Before doing so, he summons Misuzu to apologize, but she cheers him instead, lying to him saying she has not been in love before. He summons Tomo to the roof, where he reiterates his feelings, causing Tomo to punch him for having been oblivious to the effort she has made for him. However, when Junichiro remains steady even after the punch, she runs away again, embarrassed. She asks Misuzu and Carol for help, so Misuzu tearfully encourages her to pursue Junichiro knowing their feelings are mutual. She does so, and while walking back home, she finally accepts his confession in the temple staircase after he assures her they will continue being as close as before, much to his delight.
13	"To Stay by Your Side..."; Transliteration: "Tonari ni Iru Tame ni..." (Japanese: 隣にいるために…)	Takurō Tsukada	Megumi Shimizu	Namimi Sanjō	March 30, 2023
Misuzu and Carol advise Tomo to take Junichiro to a romantic movie on Christmas to get him flustered. They watch the movie, but the couple in the movie do more than just kissing, embarrassing Tomo. After the movie, they exchange Christmas presents. Tomo then invites herself to Junichiro's home. After a long, awkward silence, Tomo rages at Junichiro, saying she came to kiss him, but he explains he feels wrong doing so, revealing he asked her parents for their blessing, but was barred from dating her unless he defeated Goro. After New Years' Day, they return to school, where Misuzu and Carol confront Tomo about ignoring them, so she explains what happened. Meanwhile, Junichiro has challenged Goro. Tomo realizes during karate training that he needs her support, so she bolts to his aid. An injured Junichiro reinvigorates himself after seeing her and lands a powerful punch on Goro, breaking his nose and winning the match. After the match, he formally asks her to be his girlfriend, which she accepts by kissing him.

== Reception ==
As part of Anime News Network's Fall 2018 manga guide, Rebecca Silverman, Amy McNulty, Faye Hopper, and Teresa Navarro reviewed the first volume for the website. Silverman, McNulty, and Navarro praised the characters and art, while Hopper was more critical of the plot.

In 2016, the series won the Next Manga Award in the web manga category.
