= I-Chu =

Japanese mobile game

アイ★チュウ (Ai★Chū)
- Video game
- Developer: Liber Entertainment
- Genre: Dating sim; rhythm; adventure
- Platform: iOS; Android; Nintendo Switch
- Released: JP: June 26, 2015 (Android) July 3, 2015 (iOS) November 10, 2022 (Nintendo Switch)
- Video game

I-Chu Étoile Stage
- Developer: Liber Entertainment
- Genre: Dating sim; rhythm; adventure
- Platform: iOS; Android
- Released: JP: April 30, 2020
- Anime television series

I-Chu: Halfway Through the Idol
- Directed by: Hitoshi Nanba
- Produced by: Twin Engine
- Written by: Yoshimi Narita
- Music by: Yoshiaki Dewa
- Studio: Lay-duce
- Licensed by: Crunchyroll; SA/SEA: Muse Communication
- Original network: Tokyo MX, BS11, RNB
- Original run: January 6, 2021 – March 24, 2021
- Episodes: 12

I-Chu (Japanese: アイ★チュウ, Hepburn: Ai★Chū) is a Japanese mobile game developed by Liber Entertainment. The original game was released on June 26, 2015, on Android and July 3, 2015, for the iOS. It was followed up with the release of an updated mobile game, I-Chu Étoile Stage, on April 30, 2020, while the original game was discontinued in July 2020. A port for Nintendo Switch was announced in October 2021, and was released in Japan on November 10, 2022.

Along with the game, the franchise has released several CDs portrayed by the characters in the game, and the success of the game led to several adaptations for the franchise, including stage plays and an anime television series by Lay-duce, which aired from January 6 to March 24, 2021.

== Characters ==
=== F∞F ===
Seiya Aido (愛童星夜, Aido Seiya)
Voiced by: KENN
Kanata Minato (湊奏多, Minato Kanata)
Voiced by: Yūichi Iguchi
Akira Mitsurugi (御剣晃, Mitsurugi Akira)
Voiced by: Toshiyuki Toyonaga

=== Twinkle Bell ===
Satsuki Kururugi (枢木皐月, Kururugi Satsuki)
Voiced by: Showtaro Morikubo
Mutsuki Kururugi (枢木睦月, Kururugi Mutsuki)
Voiced by: Takashi Kondō

=== I♥B ===
Noah (ノア, Noa)
Voiced by: Natsuki Hanae
Leon (レオン, Reon)
Voiced by: Toshiki Masuda
Li Chaoyang (黎朝陽, Rei Chaoyang)
Voiced by: Junya Enoki
Rabi (ラビ, Rabi)
Voiced by: Naoya Nakanishi
Lucas (リュカ, Ryuka)
Voiced by: Yūichirō Umehara

=== ArS ===
Torahiko Kusakabe (日下部虎彦, Kusakabe Torahiko)
Voiced by: Kenji Roa
Kyōsuke Momoi (桃井恭介, Momoi Kyōsuke)
Voiced by: Hiroyuki Kagura
Akio Tobikura (鳶倉アキヲ, Tobikura Akio)
Voiced by: Atsushi Tamaru
Shiki Amabe (海部子規, Amabe Shiki)
Voiced by: Katsufumi Yachi
Hikaru Orihara (折原輝, Orihara Hikaru)
Voiced by: Yoshitsugu Matsuoka
Raku Wakaōji (若王子楽, Wakaōji Raku)
Voiced by: Daisuke Hirakawa

=== Pop'N Star ===
Kokoro Hanabusa (華房心, Hanabusa Kokoro)
Voiced by: Ayumu Murase
Runa Kagurasaka (神楽坂ルナ, Kagurasuka Runa)
Voiced by: Kōhei Amasaki
Momosuke Oikawa (及川桃助, Oikawa Momosuke)
Voiced by: Kazutomi Yamamoto

=== RE:BERSERK ===
Eva Armstrong (エヴァ・アームストロング, Evua Amusutorongu)
Voiced by: Hiro Shimono
Mio Yamanobe (山野辺澪, Yamanobe Mio)
Voiced by: Tetsuya Kakihara
Ban Jūmonji (十文字蛮, Jūmonji Ban)
Voiced by: Yoshiyuki Shimozuma

=== Lancelot ===
Issei Todoroki (轟一誠, Todoroki Issei)
Voiced by: Tomoaki Maeno
Futami Akabane (赤羽根双海, Akabane Futami)
Voiced by: Yuma Uchida
Takamichi Sanzenin (三千院鷹通, Sanzenin Takamichi)
Voiced by: Yusuke Shirai

=== Tenjō Tenge ===
Tsubaki Rindo (竜胆椿, Rindo Tsubaki)
Voiced by: Yūki Ono
Toya Honoki (朴木十夜, Hōnoki Jūya)
Voiced by: Kei Minegishi
Tatsumi Madarao (斑尾巽, Madarao Tatsumi)
Voiced by: Soma Saito
Aoi Kakitsubata (杜若葵, Kakitsubata Aoi)
Voiced by: Ryōhei Kimura

=== Other characters ===
Principal Bear (クマ校長, Kuma Kōchō)
Voiced by: Akio Otsuka
Yuzuki Asahina (朝比奈柚希, Asahina Yuzuki)
Voiced by: Megumi Toyoguchi

== Media ==
=== Game ===
I-Chu is developed by Liber Entertainment and scheduled for launch in June 2015 on the iOS and Android, with pre-registrations opening on May 18, 2015. The game was later released on June 26, 2015, on Android and July 3, 2015, for the iOS. The game included a cast of 42 voice actors and was described as a "love rhythm adventure" game.

A second mobile game titled I-Chu Étoile Stage was originally scheduled to launch in Q3 2019, but after several delays, it launched on April 30, 2020. In June 2020, Liber Entertainment announced they would be discontinuing online services for the original mobile game on July 6, 2020, which would remain playable with all features unlocked until December 13, 2020. A port for Nintendo Switch was announced in October 2021, and was released in Japan on November 10, 2022.

=== Stage plays ===
A stage play adaptation was announced during a fan meeting in 2017. The first stage play, I-Chu the Stage: Stairway to Etoile, ran from August 25–27, 2017 in Osaka and September 6–10, 2017 in Tokyo. The play had a second run from February 23 to March 1, 2018, in Tokyo, under the title I-Chu the Stage: Stairway to Etoile 2018. The third stage play, I-Chu the Stage: Rose Ecarlate was announced at the stage play's first fan meeting and ran from April 21–29, 2019 in Tokyo and May 10–12, 2019 in Osaka, with Hiro Isenao directing and writing the script. A fourth stage play, I-Chu the Stage: Rose Ecarlate Deux, ran from October 10–15, 2019 in Tokyo.

In addition to the stage plays, the cast of the stage plays held concerts while performing in character. The first concert, Live!! I-Chu the Stage: Etincelle took place in Zepp Tokyo on November 25, 2017. The second concert, Live!! I-Chu the Stage: Planete et Fleurs, took place on July 27, 2019, in Tokyo.

=== Anime ===
An anime television series adaptation titled I-Chu: Halfway Through the Idol was announced in April 2019. The series is directed by Hitoshi Nanba and written by Yoshimi Narita, with Mina Ōsawa in charge of character designs, Twin Engine as producer, Lay-duce producing the animation, and Yoshiaki Dewa composing the music. The series aired from January 6 to March 24, 2021, on Tokyo MX and BS11. The opening theme song is "Rainbow☆Harmony", and the ending theme song is "Singing! Swinging!" both performed by I-Chu Leaders (アイチュウリーダーズ, Ai Chū Rīdāzu) A special opening theme song, "The Song's Number One Star: The Legend Folklore's Future" (一番星の歌～未来のレジェンド伝説～, "Ichiban Hoshi no Uta ～Mirai no Rejendo Densetsu～") performed by I-Chu (アイチュウ, Ai Chū) was used for episode 1. Crunchyroll streamed the series outside Asia. Muse Communication licensed the series in Southeast Asia and South Asia and is streaming it on their Muse Asia YouTube channel.

No.	Title	Directed by (Note: Information is taken from the ending credits of each episode.)	Written by	Original release date
1	"The Colors of Songs"; Transliteration: "Kurūru: Uta no Irodori" (Japanese: couleur ～歌の彩～)	Takurō Tsukada	Yoshimi Narita	January 6, 2021
2	"That Which Is Engraved"; Transliteration: "Disuku: Kizamareru Mono" (Japanese: disque ～刻まれるもの～)	Miki Sakaibara	Yoshimi Narita	January 13, 2021
3	"In the Case of an Otokonoko"; Transliteration: "Pafōmansu: Otoko no Ko no Baai" (Japanese: performance ～男の娘の場合～)	Takurō Tsukada	Misaki Morie	January 20, 2021
4	"Just as You Are"; Transliteration: "Kosuchūmu: Sugao no Mama de" (Japanese: costume ～素顔のままで～)	Noriko Hashimoto	Naohiro Fukushima	January 27, 2021
5	"That Which We Wish to Convey"; Transliteration: "Sesshon: Tsutaetai Koto" (Japanese: session ～伝えたいこと～)	Hironori Aoyagi	Misaki Morie	February 3, 2021
6	"Where I Belong"; Transliteration: "Ekippu: Watashi no Ibasho" (Japanese: equipe ～私の居場所～)	Yasutaka Yamamoto	Naohiro Fukushima	February 10, 2021
7	"For a Smile"; Transliteration: "Jujuman: Egao no Tame ni" (Japanese: jugement ～笑顔のために～)	Miki Sakaibara; Takurō Tsukada	Yoshimi Narita	February 17, 2021
8	"Bonds"; Transliteration: "Vakānsu: Kizuna" (Japanese: vacance ～キズナ～)	Miki Sakaibara; Takurō Tsukada	Natsuko Imai	February 24, 2021
9	"The Lost Color"; Transliteration: "Monokurōmu: Ushinawareta Iro" (Japanese: monochrome ～失われた色～)	Yukio Kuroda	Naohiro Fukushima	March 3, 2021
10	"Back to Life"; Transliteration: "Fenikkusu: Saisei" (Japanese: phoenix ～再生～)	Noriko Hashimoto	Yoshimi Narita	March 10, 2021
11	"The Decisive Battle"; Transliteration: "Infini: Kessen" (Japanese: infini ～決戦～)	Tomoe Makino	Misaki Morie	March 17, 2021
12	"Ichu"; Transliteration: "Arumoni: Ai Chū" (Japanese: harmonie ～アイチュウ～)	Yasutaka Yamamoto	Yoshimi Narita	March 24, 2021

== Reception ==
Over 10,000 users pre-registered for I-Chu before the game's release. As of 2017, 1 million users were playing the game.
