= Orient (manga) =

Japanese manga series

- First tankōbon volume cover, featuring Musashi

オリエント (Oriento)
- Genre: Adventure; Historical fantasy
- Manga
- Written by: Shinobu Ohtaka
- Published by: Kodansha
- English publisher: NA: Kodansha USA
- Imprint: Shōnen Magazine Comics
- Magazine: Weekly Shōnen Magazine (2018–2021); Bessatsu Shōnen Magazine (2021–2024)
- Original run: May 30, 2018 – October 9, 2024
- Volumes: 22
- Anime television series
- Directed by: Tetsuya Yanagisawa
- Written by: Mariko Kunisawa
- Music by: Hideyuki Fukasawa
- Studio: A.C.G.T
- Licensed by: Crunchyroll; SA/SEA: Medialink
- Original network: TV Tokyo, BS TV Tokyo, AT-X
- English network: SEA: Animax Asia
- Original run: January 6, 2022 – September 27, 2022
- Episodes: 24
- icon

Orient (Japanese: オリエント, Hepburn: Oriento) is a Japanese manga series written and illustrated by Shinobu Ohtaka. It was serialized in Kodansha's Weekly Shōnen Magazine from May 2018 to January 2021 and later transferred to Bessatsu Shōnen Magazine, where it ran from February 2021 to October 2024, with its chapters collected in 22 tankōbon volumes. Kodansha USA licensed the manga for English release in North America. A 24-episode anime television series adaptation by A.C.G.T aired from January to September 2022.

== Plot ==
The story revolves around a fifteen-year-old boy named Musashi and takes place during Japan's Sengoku period. At the time, Japan is ruled by Oni, and Bushi are considered taboo. Musashi is blending in as a miner along with others, who are brainwashed into thinking that the demons are their saviors and fed lies about the samurai being evil. However, Musashi knows the truth. He wants to confront the demons with his certain special power.

== Characters ==
=== Main characters ===
Musashi (武蔵)
Voiced by: Yuma Uchida (Japanese); A.J. Beckles (English)
Musashi is cheerful and caring. He has proven to be determined since he firmly proposed to be a Bushi along with his friend Kojiro. His kitetsu blade is called "Enma's Odachi" (焔魔大太刀, Enma no Odachi), a longsword which has a blade that is pitch-black with a pattern that resembles flames.
Kojiro Kanemaki (鐘巻小次郎, Kanemaki Kojirō)
Voiced by: Soma Saito (Japanese); Stephen Fu (English)
Kojiro is kind, caring and self-sufficient. He tends to be a little competitive with his friend Musashi, even comparing himself to Musashi. His kitetsu blade is called "Vorpal Cherry Blossoms" (裂空八重桜, Rekku Yaezakura), a katana capable of generating multiple strikes in one action.
Tsugumi Hattori (服部つぐみ, Hattori Tsugumi)
Voiced by: Rie Takahashi (Japanese); Emi Lo (English)
Tsugumi is sweet and forgiving, but also quite manipulative. She is a powerful fighter on her own. She is shown to have a fear of letting toxic people go, and she is only able to do it with the help of her new friends Musashi and Kojiro. Her kitetsu blade is called "Twin Soaring Swallows" (飛燕 双流剣, Hien Soryuken), a weapon similar to a pair of tonfa but with blades.

=== Other characters ===
Jisai Kanemaki (鐘巻自斎, Kanemaki Jisai)
Voiced by: Katsuyuki Konishi (Japanese); Mick Lauer (English)
Jisai is the deceased father of Kojiro. He was a kind and calm man. He had to bear the harshness from the townsfolk due to his Bushi origin. He encouraged Kojiro to be proud of being a Bushi descendant.
Naotora Takeda (武田尚虎, Takeda Naotora)
Voiced by: Satoshi Hino (Japanese); Daman Mills (English)
Naotora is the captain of the Takeda Band. He is very charismatic with a rather mischievous side. His kitetsu blade is called "Bladed Wings of Habakiri" (青羽々斬, Ao no Habakiri), a small cosmic blade capable of controlling water and fire alike.
Shunrai Yamamoto (山本春雷, Yamamoto Shunrai)
Voiced by: Saori Ōnishi (Japanese); Kristen McGuire (English)
Shunrai is the vice-captain of the Takeda Band.
Aoshi Sanada (真田青志, Sanada Aoshi)
Voiced by: Haruki Ishiya (Japanese); Ben Balmaceda (English)
Aoshi is the second class general of the Takeda Band.
Hideo Kosameda (小雨田英雄, Kosameda Hideo)
Voiced by: Wataru Hatano
Hideo is the captain of the Kosameda Band. Despite his facade of being calm and gentle, he is actually arrogant and self-centered.
Shiro Inukai (犬飼四郎, Inukai Shirō)
Voiced by: Hiro Shimono (Japanese); Brandon McInnis (English)
Shiro is a member of the Obsidian Eight. His kitetsu blade is called "Abyss" (無明, Mumyo), an oversized sword with a curved blade that is able to cut out and swap locations, in which the size can range from an average human to an entire mountain top.
Nanao Inusaka (犬坂七緒, Inusaka Nanao)
Voiced by: Azumi Waki (Japanese); Heather Gonzalez (English)
Nanao is another member of the Obsidian Eight. Her kitetsu blade is called "Seven-Belled Armadillo Sword" (犰尾七鉦刀, Kyubi Shichiseto), a staff that splits into a seven-sectioned sword when activated and used as a whip.
Obsidian Goddess (黒曜の女神, Kokuyō no Megami)
Voiced by: Houko Kuwashima (Japanese); Suzie Yeung (English)
The Obsidian Goddess is the mysterious entity that hides in Musashi's body. She is chased by the Obsidian Eight.
Michiru Saruwatari (猿渡みちる, Saruwatari Michiru)
Voiced by: Kiyono Yasuno (Japanese); Xanthe Huynh (English)
Michiru is a princess and a member of the Saruwatari Band. She appears to act cold and distant, but she really has a severe case of shyness, though she eventually opens to Musashi. Her kitetsu blade is called "Lapis Lotus" (瑠璃連花, Ruri Renge), a dark blue sword with a butterfly-shaped guard on the hilt, which can manifest smaller blades arranged like an umbrella for floating in the air or for defense purposes.
Kanetatsu Naoe (直江兼竜, Naoe Kanetatsu)
Voiced by: Natsuki Hanae (Japanese); Caleb Yen (English)
Kanetatsu is the chief of territorial revenue and a first class general of the Uesugi Band. His kitetsu blade is called "Dragon Binding Blade Burster" (龍鎖烈刃刀, Ryūsa Retsujintō), a blade with a dragon emblem that allows him to conjure a long chain used to bind opponents, strong enough to cut off the horns of the Kuchisake Oni.
Tatsuomi Uesugi (上杉竜臣, Uesugi Tatsuomi)
Voiced by: Tomoaki Maeno (Japanese); Kaiji Tang (English)
Tatsuomi is the leader of the Uesugi Alliance and the captain of the Uesugi Band. He has a strict personality with a ferocious tone. His kitetsu blade is called "Mantle of the War God" (軍神のマント, Gunshin no Manto), which can enhance the strength and speed of his comrades.
Katsumi Amako (尼子勝巳, Amako Katsumi)
Voiced by: Gakuto Kajiwara (Japanese); Brian Anderson (English)
Katsumi is a member of the Amako Band and the son of Hisami Amako, the leader of the Amako Band.
Akihiro Shimazu (島津秋弘, Shimazu Akihiro)
Voiced by: Koki Uchiyama (Japanese); Aleks Le (English)
Akihiro is a member of the Shimazu Band and the son of Takahisa Shimazu, the leader of the Shimazu Band. His kitetsu blade is called "Iron Paw of Sirius" (天狼鉄脚, Tenrō Tekkyaku), two pivotal black blades that fold in and out of his sandals, requiring himself to execute a fighting technique using a lot of spinning kicks.
Kuroko Usami (宇佐美黒子, Usami Kuroko)
Voiced by: Yoko Hikasa (Japanese); Marie Westbrook (English)
Kuroko is the tactician of the Uesugi Band. Her kitetsu blade is called "Impregnable Prison" (獄門 ら所, Gokumon Rasho), which creates a cage to trap opponents or bandages to bind wounds made out of blade energy.
Masaki Amakasu (甘粕政紀, Amakasu Masaki)
Voiced by: Yoshiki Nakajima (Japanese); Matthew Greenbaum (English)
Masaki is the subordinate of Kanetatsu.

== Media ==
=== Manga ===
Written and illustrated by Shinobu Ohtaka, Orient was serialized in Kodansha's Weekly Shōnen Magazine from May 30, 2018, to January 6, 2021. The manga was then transferred to Kodansha's Bessatsu Shōnen Magazine on February 9, 2021, and finished on October 9, 2024. Kodansha collected its chapters in 22 tankōbon volumes, released from August 17, 2018, to November 8, 2024.

In March 2020, Kodansha USA announced the acquisition of the manga for English language digital release, with the first volume being released on April 7, 2020. Kodansha USA also announced the print release of the manga starting on January 26, 2021.

==== Volumes ====
No.	Original release date	Original ISBN	English release date	English ISBN
1	August 17, 2018	978-4-06-512725-4	April 7, 2020 (digital); January 26, 2021 (print)	978-1-64659-445-0 (digital); 978-1-64651-141-9 (print)
1. "Musashi and Kojiro" (武蔵と小次郎, Musashi to Kojirō); 2. "Savage God" (荒ぶる神, Araburukami); 3. "Band of Bushi" (武士団, Bushi-dan); 4. "Blue Sky Crane Wing" (碧天鶴翼, Ao Sora Kakuyoku)
2	October 17, 2018	978-4-06-513070-4	May 5, 2020 (digital); April 6, 2021 (print)	978-1-64659-356-9 (digital); 978-1-64651-161-7 (print)
5. "Hour of Victory" (勝ち鬨, Kachidoki); 6. "Complaint" (文句, Monku); 7. "Unity Under Heaven" (天下統一, Tenka Tōitsu); 8. "The Outside World" (外の世界, Soto no Sekai); 9. "Trap" (罠, Wana); 10. "Kosameda Bushi" (小雨田武士団, Kosameda Bushi-dan); 11. "By Your Side" (側にいるよ, Soba ni Iru yo); 12. "Buzzing" (ぐちゃぐちゃ, Guchagucha); 13. "The Time Is Now" (今がその時, Ima ga Sono Toki)
3	December 17, 2018	978-4-06-513487-0	June 9, 2020 (digital); July 6, 2021 (print)	978-1-64659-664-5 (digital); 978-1-64651-162-4 (print)
14. "Joint Struggle" (共闘, Kyōtō); 15. "Invisible Cage" (見えない檻, Mienai Ori); 16. "I Choose Tomorrow" (明日を選ぶ, Ashita o Erabu); 17. "Stronger" (もっと強く, Motto Tsuyoku); 18. "Three Way Struggle" (三つ巴, Mitsudomoe); 19. "Sword" (刀, Katana); 20. "Nameless Dogs" (名もなき犬, Namonaki Inu); 21. "Kanemaki Bushi" (鐘巻武士団, Kanemaki Bushi-dan); 22. "Sword Test" (刀の試し, Katana no Tameshi)
4	March 15, 2019	978-4-06-514444-2	July 7, 2020 (digital); September 14, 2021 (print)	978-1-64659-589-1 (digital); 978-1-64651-226-3 (print)
23. "The Color of the Soul" (魂の色, Tamashī no Iro); 24. "Unable to Breathe Underwater" (水中で呼吸はできない, Suichū de Kokyū wa Dekinai); 25. "Air-Splitting Cherry Blossom" (裂空八重桜, Rekku Yaezakura); 26. "Musashi's Backstory" (武蔵の生い立ち, Musashi no Oitachi); 27. "I Finally Met You" (やっと会えた, Yatto Aeta); 28. "Obsidian Goddess" (黒曜の女神, Kokuyō no Megami); 29. "Conversation with a Goddess" (女神との対話, Megami to no Taiwa); 30. "Living Like a Dead" (死人のように生きる, Shibito no Yō ni Ikiru); 31. "Sword Hunt" (刀狩り, Katana Kari); 32. "A Bushi's Way of Life" (武士の生き方, Bushi no Ikikata)
5	June 17, 2019	978-4-06-515085-6	August 18, 2020 (digital); October 5, 2021 (print)	978-1-64659-650-8 (digital); 978-1-64651-262-1 (print)
33. "Graceless Soul" (ブサイクな魂, Busaikuna Tamashii); 34. "The Meaning of a Band of Bushi" (武士団とは, Bushi-dan to wa); 35. "Nine-tailed Seven Swords" (九尾七錠刀, Kyūbi Nanajō Katana); 36. "7 vs 3" (7対3, 7 Tai 3); 37. "Head First" (真っ逆さま, Massakasama); 38. "Obsidian Power" (黒曜の覚醒, Kokuyō no Kakusei); 39. "The Power of a Goddess" (女神の力, Megami no Chikara); 40. "Meteor Shower" (流星群の一撃, Ryūsei-gun no Ichigeki); 41. "What Dwells in a Sword" (刀に宿るもの, Katana ni Yadoru Mono); 42. "Beyond This Road" (この道の先に, Kono Michi no Saki ni)
6	August 16, 2019	978-4-06-515696-4	September 15, 2020 (digital); December 7, 2021 (print)	978-1-64659-703-1 (digital); 978-1-64651-263-8 (print)
43. "Dark Meeting" (黒の会合, Kuro no Kaigō); 44. "There is Another Person" (もう一人いる, Mōhitori Iru); 45. "Wall" (壁, Kabe); 46. "Beginning of the Demon God" (はじまりの鬼神, Hajimari no Kishin); 47. "The Purple Dragon Castle" (紫龍城, Murasaki Ryū Shiro); 48. "Uesugi Bushi" (上杉武士団, Kosameda Dushi-dan); 49. "The Ogres Who Nest in Awaji" (淡路に巣食う鬼, Awaji ni Sukuu Oni); 50. "Tattooed Man" (刺青男, Shisei Otoko); 51. "Octopus Room" (タコ部屋, Takoheya); 52. "Three‐way Deadlock" (三すくみ, Sansukumi)
7	November 15, 2019	978-4-06-517160-8	October 27, 2020 (digital); February 1, 2022 (print)	978-1-64659-416-0 (digital); 978-1-64651-355-0 (print)
53. "Shimazu's Swordplay" (島津の剣技, Shimazu no Kengi); 54. "Shimazu Platoon" (島津小隊, Shimazu Shōtai); 55. "Yataro Inuda" (犬田 八咫郎, Inuda Yatarō); 56. "Disgrace on the Ship" (船上の屈辱, Senjō no Kutsujoku); 57. "The Dragon Kanji" (竜の字, Ryū no Ji); 58. "Pulverizing One Hundred Demons" (百鬼粉砕, Hyakki Funsai); 59. "Gravitation" (引力, Inryoku); 60. "The Incarnation of Tolerance" (包容力の権化, Hōyō-ryoku no Gonge); 61. "Glimmer" (煌めき, Kirameki); 62. "Black Wings" (黒の両翼, Kuro no Ryōyoku)
8	February 17, 2020	978-4-06-517888-1	November 24, 2020 (digital); April 5, 2022 (print)	978-1-64659-822-9 (digital); 978-1-64651-426-7 (print)
63. "Spy" (間者, Kanja); 64. "Justice and Reward" (大義と恩賞, Taigi to Onshō); 65. "Stone Tears" (石の涙, Ishi no Namida); 66. "The Providence of Reproduction" (生殖の摂理, Seishoku no Setsuri); 67. "Supreme Joy" (無上の喜び, Mujō no Yorokobi); 68. "The God of War's Mantle" (軍神闘衣, Gunshin Tōi); 69. "Infection" (感染, Kansen); 70. "God-Summoning" (神の召喚, Kami no Shōkan); 71. "Father and Daughter" (父と娘, Chichi to Musume); 72. "Demon Child" (鬼の子, Oni no Ko)
9	May 15, 2020	978-4-06-518686-2	December 15, 2020 (digital); June 7, 2022 (print)	978-1-64659-870-0 (digital); 978-1-64651-427-4 (print)
73. "The Stone's Memories" (石の記憶, Ishi no Kioku); 74. "Time to Retreat" (引き際, Hikigiwa); 75. "Sword God" (刀とう神しん, Tōshin); 76. "The Blood of Hope" (希望の血液, Kibō no Ketsueki); 77. "Why We Can't Retreat" (退けない訳, Hike nai Wake); 78. "Cacophony" (不協和音, Fukyōwaon); 79. "Strategist Duel" (軍師対決, Gunshi Taiketsu); 80. "Battle of Deception" (化かし合い, Bakashi Ai); 81. "Sirius Iron Kick" (天狼鉄刀, Tenrō Tettō); 82. "Tiger and Dog" (虎と犬, Tora to Inu); 83. "Jumping at Shadows" (疑心暗鬼, Gishin Anki)
10	August 17, 2020	978-4-06-519307-5	January 19, 2021 (digital); November 1, 2022 (print)	978-1-64659-916-5 (digital); 978-1-64651-523-3 (print)
84. "What Was Entrusted" (託されたもの, Takusareta mono); 85. "Red Blade First Class" (赤刀一位, Sekitō Ichi no Kurai); 86. "Golden Thread Surgery" (金糸執刀, Kinshi Shittō); 87. "Burdened with the Band" (団を背負う, Dan o Seou); 88. "Avidya" (無明, Mumyō); 89. "Diamond Soul" (金剛石の魂, Kongōseki no Tamashī); 90. "Like a Demon God" (鬼神の如く, Kishin no Gotoku); 91. "The Ultimate Blue Blade" (青刀の極み, Seitō no Kiwami); 92. "With My Own Power" (自分の力で, Jibun no Chikara de); 93. "Proof of Existence" (存在証明, Sonzai Shōmei)
11	November 17, 2020	978-4-06-520599-0	April 20, 2021 (digital); November 8, 2022 (print)	978-1-63699-054-5 (digital); 978-1-64651-524-0 (print)
94. "What I Can Do" (自分にできること, Jibun ni Dekiru Koto); 95. "Fusion" (融合体, Yūgōtai); 96. "The Red Blade's Role" (赤刀の役目, Sekitō no Yakume); 97. "This Time I'll..." (今度は俺が, Kondo wa Ore ga); 98. "Restart" (再起動, Seikidō); 99. "Shimazu Breakdown" (島津決裂, Shimazu Ketsuretsu); 100. "Akihiro and the Tactical Pawn" (秋弘と陣駒, Akihiro to Jinkoma); 101. "A Red Blade's Duty" (赤刀の責務, Sekitō no Sekimu); 102. "The Red Curse" (赤の呪縛, Aka no Jubaku); 103. "Scales" (天秤, Tenbin)
12	March 17, 2021	978-4-06-521636-1	December 6, 2022 (digital); December 13, 2022 (print)	978-1-63699-304-1 (digital); 978-1-64651-525-7 (print)
104. "Elder Brother, Younger Brother" (兄と弟, Ani to Otōto); 105. "Since Long Before" (ずっと前から, Zuttomaekara); 106. "Swell of Joy" (歓喜の渦, Kanki no Uzu); 107. "His Greatest Masterpiece" (最高傑作, Saikō Kessaku); 108. "Blade of the Dark Goddess" (黒き女神の大剣, Kuroki Megami no Daiken); 109. "The Savage Goddess" (荒ぶる女神, Araburu Megami); 110. "The Defense" (防衛戦, Bōei-sen); 111. "A Great Hole In My Heart" ((心の中の大きな穴, Kokoro no Naka no Ōkina Ana); 112. "The Golden-Hair" (黄金の髪, Ōgon no Kami); 113. "Michiru and Yataro" (みちると八咫郎, Michiru to Yataro)
13	August 6, 2021	978-4-06-524468-5	February 7, 2023	978-1-68491-904-8 (digital); 978-1-64651-526-4 (print)
114. "Distinguished Service" (軍ぐん功こう, Gunkō); 115. "The Vow' (誓ちかい, Chikai); 116. "Gotta Get Stronger" (強つよくならなきゃ, Tsuyoku naranakya); 117. "Gathering of Generals" (五ご傑けつ将しょう会かい議ぎ, Goketsusho Kaigi)
14	January 7, 2022	978-4-06-526587-1	April 4, 2023 (digital); April 11, 2023 (print)	978-1-68491-985-7 (digital); 978-1-64651-658-2 (print)
118. "The Obsidian Eight" (黒こく曜よう石せきの八人にん, Kokuyōseki no Hachi-nin); 119. "Declaration of War" (宣せん戦せん布ふ告こく, Sensen Fukoku); 120. "Shirojishi Castle" (白しろ獅じ子し城じょ, Shirojishi-jō); 121. "The Secret of the Black Sword" ((黒こく刀とうの秘密ひみつ, Kokutou no Himitsu)
15	March 9, 2022	978-4-06-527267-1	June 6, 2023	979-8-88933-022-6 (digital); 978-1-64651-714-5 (print)
122. "Crystals of Darkness" (暗あん黒こく結けっ晶しょ, Ankoku Kesshō); 123. "Jisai and Kojiro" (自斎じさいと小こ次じ郎ろ, Jisai to Kojirō); 124. "The Great King" (一いっ騎き当とう千せんの王お, Ikkitōsen no Ō); 125. "Bloodlust" ((殺さっ気き, Sakki)
16	July 9, 2022	978-4-06-528380-6	August 8, 2023 (digital); August 15, 2023 (print)	979-8-88933-172-8 (digital); 978-1-64651-824-1 (print)
126. "Jisai and Shishikado" (自斎じさいと獅し氏し門かど, Jisai to Shishikado); 127. "The Sheath Household" (鞘さやの一いち族ぞく, Saya no Ichizoku); 128. "The Eighth Brother" (八番ばん目めの兄きょう弟だ, Hachi-banme no Kyōdai); 129. "Black Seeds" ((黒くろき種たね, Kuroki Tane)
17	November 9, 2022	978-4-06-529399-7	October 10, 2023	979-8-88933-238-1 (digital); 978-1-64651-904-0 (print)
130. "Crush You All" (ぶっ壊す, Bukkowasu); 131. "Reigentou" (霊幻刀, Reigentō); 132. "Crimson Sword Spirit" (紅蓮刀気, Guren Tōki); 133. "Tamamo and Kojiro" (玉藻と小次郎, Tamamo to Kojirō)
18	March 9, 2023	978-4-06-530912-4	December 12, 2023 (digital); December 19, 2023 (print)	979-8-88933-348-7 (digital); 978-1-64651-905-7 (print)
19	July 7, 2023	978-4-06-532167-6	April 16, 2024	979-8-88933-542-9 (digital); 979-8-88877-060-3 (print)
20	December 7, 2023	978-4-06-533505-5	April 14, 2026	979-8-89830-000-5 (digital); 979-8-88877-274-4 (print)
21	May 9, 2024	978-4-06-535161-1	—	—
22	November 8, 2024	978-4-06-537417-7	—	—

=== Anime ===
On January 4, 2021, it was announced that the series will receive an anime television series adaptation. The series is animated by A.C.G.T and directed by Tetsuya Yanagisawa, with Mariko Kunisawa handling the scripts, Takahiro Kishida designing the characters, and Hideyuki Fukasawa composing the series' music. It aired from January 6 to March 24, 2022, on TV Tokyo and AT-X. (Note: TV Tokyo listed the air dates for the series on Wednesday at 24:00, which is effectively Thursday at 0:00 a.m. JST.) The series' opening theme song is "Break Out", performed by Da-ice, while the ending theme song is "Nani Iro" (ナニイロ; 'What Color?'), performed by Wataru Hatano. Crunchyroll streamed the series outside of Asia.

At the end of the twelfth episode, a second cours was announced, which aired from July 12 to September 27, 2022. The opening theme song is "Break It Down", performed by Sōta Hanamura from Da-ice and Lil' Fang from Faky, while the ending theme song is "Irochigai no Itotaba" (色違いの糸束; 'A Bundle of Different-colored Threads'), performed by Gakuto Kajiwara.

Medialink licensed the series in Southeast Asia and South Asia; they released it on Ani-One Ultra YouTube channel for membership subscribers, iQIYI and Animax Asia. On January 13, 2022, Crunchyroll announced that the series would receive an English dub, which premiered on February 23.

==== Episodes ====
No.	Title	Original release date
Part 1
1	"Musashi & Kojiro"; Transliteration: "Musashi to Kojirō" (Japanese: 武蔵と小次郎)	January 6, 2022
In the town of Tatsuyama, the townspeople view the Oni as sacred and consider the Bushi as taboo. Musashi is a top graduating student at Tatsuyama's Miner Training School with opposing views of the Oni, while Kojiro Kanemaki is an orphaned outcast for his strong beliefs of the Bushi. Upon visiting Kojiro, Musashi aspires to fight alongside Kojiro against the Oni as their childhood promise, but Kojiro criticizes Musashi for his desire to be accepted by society. During a graduation ceremony, Musashi and his classmates head towards the Oni Gate for their first day of work as miners. Once inside, they are traumatized upon seeing a horde of catlike Nekomata Oni. Meanwhile, Kojiro discovers that Musashi left behind his training notes, proving that Musashi was secretly mastering his fighting techniques at school. With a small pickaxe as his weapon, Musashi eventually realizes that he must be honest with himself. As Musashi is no match against one of the Nekomata Oni, Kojiro barges through the Oni Gate with a motorbike called a kitetsu mount, having fetched Musashi's large pickaxe sword before assisting him in defeating the horde of Nekomata Oni.
2	"Bushi's Pride"; Transliteration: "Bushi no Hokori" (Japanese: 武士の誇り)	January 13, 2022
A powerful Oni known as a Great Kishin awakens from its slumber. Although Musashi and Kojiro easily defeat the Great Kishin, it quickly regenerates before transforming into the birdlike Engoku Tengu. The Engoku Tengu tries to take Kojiro's katana away from him, but Kojiro refuses to let it go. Kojiro recalls when his late father Jisai Kanemaki said that the katana represents his pride as a Bushi. The Engoku Tengu eventually devours the katana after separating it from Kojiro. Musashi climbs onto the Engoku Tengu and attempts to pick his way into its stomach. Fortunately, Musashi manages to fish for Kojiro's katana within the stomach acid. With the Engoku Tengu now seemingly defeated, Musashi and Kojiro decide to carry out their mission. Suddenly, the Takeda Band, led by Naotora Takeda, arrives to face the Engoku Tengu as it regenerates again. Although Naotora tells Musashi and Kojiro to evacuate, Musashi chooses to stay behind and fight, much to Naotora's interest.
3	"The Outside World"; Transliteration: "Soto no Sekai" (Japanese: 外の世界)	January 20, 2022
After preventing Musashi from attacking the Engoku Tengu any further, Naotora scolds Musashi for being in over his head. However, an ambitious Musashi causes a rockslide just as the Takeda Band fail to initiate a synchronized attack against the Engoku Tengu. Thanks to some newfound knowledge from Kojiro, Musashi aims his attack at the horn on the belly of the Engoku Tengu, but Musashi's pickaxe sword breaks in the process. Instead, Naotora steps in and slices the horn, causing the Engoku Tengu to finally fall and dissolve. Naotora challenges to dream the impossible, whether it is for stability or for victory. Struggling to hold his feelings inside, Musashi finally lashes out on Naotora for stealing his first kill. Impressed by Musashi, Naotora gives Musashi a jewel as a consolation prize. Upon further investigation, Musashi and Kojiro figure out that this jewel is a kaleidoscope used as a tool for detecting the Oni. After learning that the country will be united when the mightiest Kishin are slain, Musashi makes his declaration to Naotora. Musashi and Kojiro set off on their kitetsu mount as they start their journey to the outside world.
4	"The Kosameda Band"; Transliteration: "Kosameda Bushidan" (Japanese: 小雨田武士団)	January 27, 2022
After wandering in the desert for seven days, Musashi and Kojiro run out of food. When they stop by a river, Musashi becomes jealous when Kojiro catches a pile of fish. They are suddenly ambushed by Tsugumi Hattori. Although Kojiro becomes easily wounded, Musashi is able to stand his ground against Tsugumi. Just as Tsugumi prepares to go at full force, she steals Musashi and Kojiro's kitetsu mount before being summoned to the castle Samidare, home to Hideo Kosameda, captain of the Kosameda Band. As Musashi and Kojiro arrive at Samidare on foot, Tsugumi happily gives them a tour. Tsugumi soon reveals that her older sister Tsubame Hattori was killed by an Oni in the past. During a feast, Hideo proposes that Musashi and Kojiro should fight alongside the Kosameda Band. However, Hideo decides to imprison them when they do not know about kitetsu blades. Hideo berates Tsugumi for being useless, as he plans to fully mobilize Samidare, which will endanger the lives of the townspeople. Tsugumi later explains to Musashi and Kojiro that kitetsu blades are swords made from Oni iron. Running away, Tsugumi decides to bottle up her feelings about the lives of the townspeople being endangered.
5	"Choosing Tomorrow"; Transliteration: "Ashita o Erabu" (Japanese: 明日を選ぶ)	February 3, 2022
As Musashi and Kojiro escape from imprisonment, they spot a swarm of Kodama Oni approaching Samidare. When Tsugumi goes against Hideo's decision to fully mobilize Samidare, Hideo threatens to exile Tsugumi from Samidare if she defies him. Musashi and Kojiro barges into Tsugumi's bedroom with their kitetsu mount, as they tell her to be her own person. As Musashi and Kojiro get back their weapons, Tsugumi creates a distraction, telling Hideo to spare the lives of the townspeople. Even though Musashi and Kojiro disarm the guards, Tsugumi is unable to convince the townspeople to flee since they are afraid of defying Hideo. As a last resort, Tsugumi duels against Hideo in a bid to open the eyes of the townspeople. Although Tsugumi initially struggles, she eventually goes at full force and chooses her own path, finally defeating Hideo. As the townspeople finally retreat to the desert, the swarm of Kodama Oni begin to overrun Samidare. Musashi and Kojiro bring Tsugumi to safety on their kitetsu mount.
6	"Getting Stronger"; Transliteration: "Motto Tsuyoku" (Japanese: もっと強く)	February 10, 2022
With Samidare now destroyed by the swarm of Kodama Oni in the aftermath, Tsugumi is eventually convinced to leave with Musashi and Kojiro. On the night before leaving, Musashi tells Tsugumi how they are similar in following the dream of reuniting the country. The next morning, Musashi, Kojiro and Tsugumi leave on their kitetsu mount as the townspeople bid farewell to Tsugumi. At a rest stop, Kojiro witnesses Tsugumi being clingy to Musashi. Unbeknownst to each other, Musashi is attracted to older women like his schoolteachers, while Kojiro has no romantic experience whatsoever. However, Tsugumi behaved awkwardly because she just wanted to be friends with Musashi and Kojiro. Later on, Musashi chases after a stray Kodami Oni when it steals Kojiro's katana. Musashi is led to Shiro Inukai in a field of various kitetsu blades. When Musashi grabs a kitetsu blade, he draws out immense power, managing to kill the stray Kodami Oni and recover Kojiro's katana. Nanao Inusaka soon arrives to escort Shiro away. Both Shiro and Nanao vanish when Kojiro and Tsugumi find Musashi. In order to get stronger, Musashi, Kojiro and Tsugumi plan to shop for kitetsu blades at a marketplace in the Great Eastern Mine.
7	"You Can't Survive Underwater"; Transliteration: "Mizu no Naka de wa Ikirarenai" (Japanese: 水の中では生きられない)	February 17, 2022
At a ramen shop, Musashi tells Tsugumi that Kojiro should be the captain of the Kanemaki Band. During a kitetsu blade auction, Musashi, Kojiro and Tsugumi meet the head swordsmith of the Ryuzoji Band named Mitsuru Osafune, who explains that choosing a kitetsu blade is an important rite of passage. Musashi and Kojiro each undergo a trial after grasping the hilt of their chosen kitetsu blades. After Kojiro passes his trial as a blue soul, Mitsuru explains that kitetsu blades can reveal a soul of a Bushi by glowing in one of five colors (blue, green, yellow, red and white). During his trial, Musashi is rejected by the Obsidian Goddess when he emits black aura. Musashi has his dreams of being a Bushi now crushed after learning that he will never wield a kitetsu blade, as Mitsuru analogizes being unable to breathe underwater or survive when engulfed in flames. As a Kishin suddenly sends a herd of Bull Oni from the sky, Kojiro easily slays them with his new kitetsu blade along with help from Mitsuru. While Kojiro and Tsugumi leave to dispatch more Kishin at the mountain top, Musashi encounters Shiro, who reveals that he also emits black aura.
8	"The Obsidian Goddess"; Transliteration: "Kokuyō no Megami" (Japanese: 黒曜の女神)	February 24, 2022
Shiro advises Musashi to accept the black stones within him in order to become stronger. After using his kitetsu blade to create a large pit, Shiro throws Musashi into the pit along with a discarded kitetsu blade. Meanwhile, Tsugumi learns that Musashi came from a family of farmers, while Kojiro grew up on the outskirts of town away from society, though Musashi always treated Kojiro as his equal. Shiro reveals to Nanao that the Obsidian Goddess resides within Musashi. Nanao soon realizes that Shiro plans on using Musashi as raw materials for a new weapon. As Musashi continues to fall down the pit, he grabs onto the discarded kitetsu blade and stops himself from falling. Musashi starts turning to black stone, and he ends up falling in magma at the bottom of the pit. Inside Musashi's consciousness, the Obsidian Goddess urges Musashi to stay hidden. In the past, Musashi was rejected by his relatives after his parents died from an epidemic. Desperately trying to feel needed, Musashi was eventually pressured into throwing a rock at Jisai in public. In the present, the Obsidian Goddess breaks Musashi's will to fight, embracing him as he fully turns to black stone.
9	"A Bushi's Way of Life"; Transliteration: "Bushi no Ikikata" (Japanese: 武士の生き方)	March 3, 2022
Kojiro and Tsugumi reach the mountain top and find a Headless Kishin. It is revealed that Shiro was responsible for beheading the Headless Kishin with its horn still intact. After wreaking havoc, Shiro approaches Kojiro and Tsugumi, saying that Musashi is becoming a kitetsu blade. Musashi is rescued by Nanao, who uses her kitetsu blade to pull Musashi up from the pit. He then rushes to the mountain top with his new kitetsu blade. In the past, Musashi apologized to Jisai for publicly humiliating him. Jisai adopted Musashi after thanking him for being Kojiro's friend. In the present, Musashi recalls that Jisai taught him the way of life for a Bushi. Musashi arrives just as Kojiro struggles in an earthshaking duel against Shiro. Kojiro and Tsugumi learn that Musashi is neither accepted nor rejected by his kitetsu blade. Nanao then arrives, apologizing to Shiro for pulling Musashi up from the pit too early. Kojiro is reminded by Musashi that the Bushi fight alongside their friends. Musashi, Kojiro and Tsugumi dodge the incredible attacks executed by Nanao with her kitetsu blade.
10	"The Goddess's Power"; Transliteration: "Megami no Chikara" (Japanese: 女神の力)	March 10, 2022
Following Kojiro's plan, Musashi and Tsugumi split up, allowing them to restrain and destroy a part of Nanao's kitetsu blade. Against Nanao's plea, Shiro steps in to handle the job himself. Shiro uses his kitetsu blade to cut the mountain top and flip it upside-down, leaving Musashi, Kojiro and Tsugumi clinging for their lives. When Shiro sends Musashi, Kojiro and Tsugumi plummeting to their deaths, time suddenly freezes as the Obsidian Goddess appears before Musashi, explaining that Shiro and Nanao are trying to capture her. Musashi tries to reason with the Obsidian Goddess, telling her that he will not leave behind Kojiro and Tsugumi. Entrusting Musashi with her power, the Obsidian Goddess possesses Musashi's body before restoring the mountain top. The Obsidian Goddess informs Kojiro and Tsugumi that people consisting of black stones like Musashi can draw and repel any attack like a powerful magnet. Before returning to her slumber within Musashi, the Obsidian Goddess prepares to attack Shiro and Nanao by drawing sword spirit energy from the others.
11	"What's in a Katana"; Transliteration: "Katana ni Yadoru Mono" (Japanese: 刀に宿るもの)	March 24, 2022 (Note: The episode was preempted from its March 17 as TV Tokyo had broadcast special programming regarding the 2022 Fukushima earthquake. It was inadvertently released on time on multiple streaming platforms including Crunchyroll before being removed to stay conform with the original air date. Episode 11 and 12 both aired back-to-back on March 24, 2022.)
Musashi regains possession of his body after the Obsidian Goddess initiates a groundbreaking attack that causes Shiro and Nanao to seemingly vanish into thin air. Surprisingly, a large pit appears where the Headless Kishin used to be, hinting that Shiro and Nanao managed to escape with it out to sea. Musashi, Kojiro and Tsugumi discuss that a kitetsu blade is a testament to the life of a Bushi. At night, Mitsuru provides lodging for Musashi, Kojiro and Tsugumi at the Ryuzoji Band Castle. The next day, Mitsuru grants Musashi the opportunity to redo his trial. Recalling how Jisai taught him the way of life for a Bushi, Musashi passes his trial as a red soul. Afterwards, Musashi privately tells Kojiro that he saw Jisai during his trial, leading Kojiro to believe that there is more to Jisai's past. Meanwhile, Shiro and Nanao discuss that the Obsidian Goddess used to reside within Jisai before choosing Musashi as her new vessel. After getting his head straight from pondering about Jisai's past, Kojiro later gets food and supplies, also obtaining a detailed map of the country of Hinomoto. Musashi, Kojiro and Tsugumi unanimously decide to head east on their kitetsu mount.
12	"Where This Road Leads"; Transliteration: "Kono Michi no Saki ni" (Japanese: この道の先に)	March 24, 2022 (Note: This episode aired as an hour special alongside episode 11 on TV Tokyo.)
In a swamp forest, Musashi rescues Kojiro and Tsugumi from being captured by an Octopus Jar Oni, easily destroying its horn with his kitetsu blade. Musashi also saves Michiru Saruwatari, who is revealed to be a princess and a member of the Saruwatari Band sworn under the Uesugi Alliance. She is headed for Harima Port, where a decisive battle is imminent. As gratitude for saving Michiru from danger, Musashi, Kojiro and Tsugumi hitch a ride, though Musashi struggles to break the ice with Michiru. When the road becomes bumpy, Musashi and Michiru fall off a cliff, in which Michiru catches Musashi before using her kitetsu blade in order to float in the air back towards the cliff. After admitting her severe case of shyness, Michiru shows Musashi that half of Hinomoto in the east is engulfed by the first and strongest Oni called the Black Kishin, which was historically responsible for a divided nation. Meanwhile, the Uesugi Alliance prepares for their imminent battle. Elsewhere, the Obsidian Eight contacts Nanao, who confirms that the Obsidian Goddess was located. Heading towards the ocean, Musashi and Tsugumi support Kojiro in knowing more about Jisai's life before Tatsuyama.
Part 2
13	"The Uesugi Band"; Transliteration: "Uesugi Bushidan" (Japanese: 上杉武士団)	July 12, 2022
Musashi, Kojiro Kanemaki and Tsugumi Hattori arrive at Harima Port, where Shiryu Castle, the mobile citadel of the Uesugi Band, is stationed. Kanetatsu Naoe, the accountant of the Uesugi Band, does not allow Musashi, Kojiro and Tsugumi into Shiryu Castle, but Naotora Takeda makes a surprise entrance and pardons them. Kanetatsu escorts Naotora to meet with Tatsuomi Uesugi, leader of the Uesugi Alliance and captain of the Uesugi Band. Shunrai Yamamoto and Aoshi Sanada, the respective vice-captain and second class general of the Takeda Band, inform Musashi, Kojiro and Tsugumi that the Uesugi Alliance will be going to Awaji Island in order to battle the serpent-like Yamata no Orochi, one of the Four Blights, which are offspring of the Black Kishin. After sneaking inside Shiryu Castle and unknowingly meeting Tatsuomi on a rooftop, Musashi is soon caught by Kanetatsu, who detains and separates Musashi from Kojiro and Tsugumi. Musashi is taken to a room with members of the Uesugi Alliance. After Michiru approaches Musashi and worries about the dangerous battle ahead, Musashi finds himself in a three-way match against Katsumi Amako and Akihiro Shimazu in order to determine who will be the squad leader.
14	"Shipboard Disgrace"; Transliteration: "Senjō no Kutsujoku" (Japanese: 船上の屈辱)	July 19, 2022
After ultimately being chosen as the squad leader, Akihiro calls out Musashi and Katsumi for their hidden agendas. The Shimazu Squad will be part of the first deployment to Awaji Island. On the ships the next day, Musashi disagrees with the chain of command when Akihiro plans to hog credit for the killing blows after the other squad members pin down the enemy. While peeling potatoes alone, Musashi befriends fellow squad member Kijinosuke Noguchi. Meanwhile, Kuroko Usami explains that Kanetatsu will be leading the first deployment. Suddenly, many Kuchisake Oni, offspring of Yamata no Orochi, appear and attack the ships. Musashi is shocked that the horns of the Kuchisake Oni are sturdy, but Kanetatsu easily cuts off the horns with his kitetsu blade, revealing himself as a first class general of the Uesugi Band. As more Kuchisake Oni appear in utter disorder, Kanetatsu binds them in a single file and cuts off their horns in one blow. Akihiro also manages to cut off the horns by tapping into the blade energy circuit, channeling the energy of the Shimazu Squad. Musashi embarrassingly realizes that all the squad members are working towards the same goal of slaying the Oni.
15	"Equals"; Transliteration: "Kanja" (Japanese: 間者)	July 26, 2022
During their meeting, Tatsuomi informs Naotora that the Obsidian Goddess has been found. As Musashi recounts being shamed by the Shimazu Squad, Katsumi motivates him to move past the embarrassment. Katsumi initially wanted to be the unit commander because Awaji Island is his homeland. Musashi then decides to train with Katsumi. Michiru reports to her father Yataro Inuda, a member of the Obsidian Eight, who tells her to find the Obsidian Goddess and execute the host. As she observes Musashi training with Katsumi, Michiru notes that the Obsidian Goddess remains undiscovered inside Musashi. Michiru agrees to cross her blade energy with Musashi, but black stones start growing from their bodies, turning them into a floating black crystal. Kuroko uses her kitetsu blade to trap Musashi and Michiru in a cage, reverting them to normal. As Michiru is released, Musashi undergoes crucifixion after he is accused of being a spy. Kuroko spots Michiru activating her black stone on the south side of Awaji Island at the summit of Mount Yuzuruha. Tatsuomi rallies the units for their battle against Yamata no Orochi, but Kanetatsu orders the Shimazu Squad to stay on standby since Musashi and Michiru are under certain suspicions.
16	"The War God's Mantle"; Transliteration: "Gunshin Toui" (Japanese: 軍神闘衣)	August 2, 2022
Michiru liberates Musashi from being tied to the wooden cross. Akihiro then threatens Musashi to prove that he has nothing to do with the Shimazu Squad. Minami, Iwanami and Mishima, three of Yataro's children created from Yamata no Orochi's kitetsu, suddenly arrive at Shiryu Castle with the intention of capturing the Obsidian Goddess. After admitting of being a spy all along, Michiru is contacted by Yataro, who orders her to complete the mission. However, Musashi grabs Michiru's kitetsu blade and uses it to cut off Minami's fingers. Musashi tries to run away with Michiru, who shields him from being devoured by Minami, Iwanami and Mishima. Kanetatsu and Kuroko arrive to intervene. After binding Michiru's wounds, Kuroko soon realizes that either Musashi or Michiru could be the Obsidian Goddess. Using Yataro's belief of the law of natural selection, Minami and Iwanami devour Mishima, making them grow larger and stronger. Tatsuomi releases his blade energy, which enables him to enhance the members of the Uesugi Band with their armors, kitetsu blades, arm strength and leg speed. Minami and Iwanami are overpowered by the Uesugi Band as Kanetatsu easily cuts off their horns. Shiro suddenly appears and gravely injures Tatsuomi.
17	"Memories of Stone"; Transliteration: "Ishi no Kioku" (Japanese: 石の記憶)	August 9, 2022
Responsible for letting Minami, Iwanami and Mishima raid Shiryu Castle, Shiro now has Tatsuomi's kitetsu blade. Seiroku Inukawa, another member of the Obsidian Eight, infects the Uesugi Band and severs the blade energy circuit, foiling the attempt to capture Shiro. Going against Seiroku's order to massacre the Uesugi Band, Shiro approaches Musashi and Michiru, sending them to the heart of Awaji Island and switching them with one of Yamata no Orochi's eight heads. Meanwhile, Kojiro and Tsugumi recover Musashi's kitetsu blade. At Awaji Island, Michiru begs Yataro to capture the Obsidian Goddess while sparing Musashi's life. Yataro turns Michiru into stone before explaining that Michiru was among his children implanted with kitetsu fragments who were cast aside. After reverting Michiru to normal, Yataro reveals that he erased her memories. Despite being riled up, Musashi is too weak against Yataro. Michiru stabs Yataro in the back, hinting that she still has lingering memories. While Seiroku stops torturing Kanetatsu, Naotora arrives with the Takeda Band and attacks Shiro. Musashi wakes up the next day in a field hospital. Kojiro and Tsugumi inform him that some members of the Uesugi Alliance are deserting the mission. A wounded Kanetatsu then asks for Musashi's help.
18	"Tactician Battle"; Transliteration: "Gunshi Taiketsu" (Japanese: 軍師対決)	August 16, 2022
Kanetatsu takes Musashi, Kojiro and Tsugumi to the Uesugi Band's underground mausoleum. Musashi is forced to drink from a chalice supposedly filled with blood in an effort to manifest the Obsidian Goddess's power, which will allow him to control all types of blade energy, but it has no immediate effect. Meanwhile, Kuroko plans to slay Yamata no Orochi, rescue Tatsuomi and defeat the Obsidian Eight in three deployments. However, Naotora seemingly disagrees with attempting all three objectives together. While spying on the Uesugi Command Center, Shiro and Seiroku relieve Yataro of his duties. During the landing operation, the vanguard creates a diversion by spreading and igniting oil. The strike force, including the Shimazu Squad, prepares to demolish Yamata no Orochi's food supply at the Yura Mine, while the Takeda Band is dispatched into the field as Naotora was aware of lurking spies. Shiro suddenly appears at the Yura Mine and transports the explosives onto the Takeda Band's ships, though the ships remain intact. Seiroku is caught off guard when Kuroko reveals that his spies relayed false information. Kanetatsu suddenly battles Seiroku in an attempt to shatter Seiroku's kitetsu blade, which will restore the blade energy circuit.
19	"A Matter of Trust"; Transliteration: "Takusareta mono" (Japanese: 託されたもの)	August 23, 2022
After a grueling battle, Kanetatsu manages to shatter Seiroku's kitetsu blade and restore the blade energy circuit. Kuroko orders the elite black clad forces to slay Yamata no Orochi. At the northwest coast of Awaji Island, Seiroku draws a second kitetsu blade against Kanetatsu. The Takeda Band prepare to face Shiro at the Yura Mine, while the strike force heads off to face Yataro. Seiroku uses thin sutures on Kanetatsu in order to lacerate his body, blind his eyes temporarily, dislocate his knees and fracture his fingers. Kanetatsu musters enough strength to aim his kitetsu blade at himself, eradicating all the thin sutures. Despite the blood loss, Kanetatsu purposely allows his hand to be stabbed by Seiroku, who is finally defeated when Kanetatsu stabs him in the chest. Kuroko entrusts the white clad forces, including Kojiro and Tsugumi, with rescuing Tatsuomi. After effortlessly shattering a barrier created by Shunrai, Shiro submerges Naotora in a cube of water, but Naotora easily slashes through it, which Aoshi anticipated. Naotora treats the Oni as natural disasters and hates Shiro for spreading chaos. After redirecting Naotora's launched attack, Shiro reveals himself as a white soul, the strongest type of Bushi.
20	"Leaving Your Mark"; Transliteration: "Sonzai Shōmei" (Japanese: 存在証明)	August 30, 2022
Shiro pours magma above Naotora, who manifests water in order to harden the magma into stone. Naotora attacks with twin tigers of fire and water, but Shiro easily dispels them. After he transports himself and Naotora inside a void, Shiro is shocked that Naotora developed his technique of fire and water in order to destroy the Obsidian Eight instead of the Kishin. Naotora manages to escape after shattering Shiro's kitetsu blade and destroying the void. The Shimazu Squad splits up into two groups led by Katsumi and Akihiro. With Seiroku and Shiro both defeated, Yataro takes Michiru to the deepest layer of Awaji Island's mineral deposits, where Yataro plans to solely defend Yamata no Orochi. Yataro brings her to a pool full of his daughters who were cast aside. When Akihiro only wants to target Yamata no Orochi, Katsumi tells Musashi that Akihiro only cares about glory, leaving a mark in history if he breaks the horn of a Kishin. As the strike force approaches Yataro, he transforms into a large Kishin using the power of his daughters who were cast aside.
21	"Clash of the Shimazu"; Transliteration: "Shimatsu Ketsuretsu" (Japanese: 島津決裂)	September 6, 2022
Yataro turns his daughters into kitetsu blades, wiping out the strike force except the Shimazu Squad. Moreover, Yataro's kitetsu blades fire beams, which repeatedly block Akihiro and the Shimazu Band from forming a blade energy circuit. Musashi then decides to find a way to help Akihiro and the Shimazu Band. Although he tries to destroy Yataro's kitetsu blades one by one, Musashi is knocked down by Yataro. Despite this, Musashi continues to help and protect the Shimazu Band. With the blade energy circuit now linked by the Shimazu Band, Akihiro finally manages to break Yataro's horn. However, Yataro then transforms into a large white serpent carrying minerals towards the summit of Mount Yuzuruha. The Shimazu Band plan to form a blade energy circuit with Musashi. However, the Shimazu Band has a falling-out when Akihiro confirms that his priority is to become the leader of the clan. Following through with the plan, the Shimazu Band form a blade energy circuit with Musashi, but Akihiro attempts to snatch the link away from Musashi. As Musashi apologizes for stealing the spotlight from Akihiro, the latter reveals that he never wanted to become the leader in the first place.
22	"Older and Younger Brothers"; Transliteration: "Ani to Otōto" (Japanese: 兄と弟)	September 13, 2022
The Shimazu Band, composed of Akihiro's two half-brothers and three cousins, wonders why Akihiro is so desperately fixated on glory and status. When Akihiro passed his sword trial as a red soul during childhood, he was forced by his father Takahisa Shimazu to become the heir to the clan. As the white serpent continues moving, the Shimazu Squad begrudgingly form a blade energy circuit for Akihiro. At the summit of Mount Yuzuruha, Yamata no Orochi consumes Akihiro along with the white serpent. Akihiro later realizes that his older half-brother Haruhisa Shimazu severed the blade energy circuit in order to rescue him. As Musashi, Katsumi and the rest of the Shimazu Band arrive, Akihiro is unable to complete the blade energy circuit with the others in his critical condition. When Haruhisa reminds Akihiro that they are family, this motivates Akihiro to finally break the white serpent's horn. With Yamata no Orochi's source of nourishment now severed, Yamata no Orochi is finally defeated when the elite black clad forces break all of its horns. Despite Akihiro being humble for his good deed, Haruhisa points out that the Shimazu Band will be legendary. Meanwhile, the white clad forces continue their mission to rescue Tatsuomi.
23	"Greatsword of the Black Goddess"; Transliteration: "Kuroki Megami no Daiken" (Japanese: 黒き女神の大剣)	September 20, 2022
Musashi is elated that Kojiro and Tsugumi completed their mission of rescuing Tatsuomi. When Tatsuomi was detained, he previously spoke with Michiru, who thought that everyone including Musashi saw her as a worthless pebble. The Uesugi Alliance goes inside the summit, where Yataro had previously fused with Yamata no Orochi. Yataro wields a kitetsu blade, revealed to be Michiru in the form of a black greatsword. He is proven powerful as he can absorb blade energy before sending a wayward blast. Michiru is split between serving and stopping Yataro. Naotora, Kanetatsu and Tatsuomi fail to apprehend Yataro. Time suddenly freezes when Kojiro blocks Yataro's attack. Musashi finds Michiru inside a portal. In child form, both Musashi and Michiru have holes in their hearts. It was because of Musashi that Michiru was able to explore the world and discover new things. Regaining her memories, Michiru agrees to follow Musashi, and they revert to adolescent form. The only way that Michiru can revert to a human in reality is if Musashi can destroy the black stone inside Yataro. Since the Obsidian Goddess is made from the combination of all five soul colors, Musashi must be able to master one of her powers.
24	"A Vow"; Transliteration: "Chikai" (Japanese: 誓い)	September 27, 2022
As time resumes, Musashi temporarily gains the power of a yellow soul. Despite losing his left arm in a clash, Musashi blocks Yataro with his right index finger. Musashi cracks Yataro's armor with rapid punches and uncovers the black stone. Michiru talks to Yataro inside the portal. Aside from their differences, Michiru learns that Yataro is slowly dying. Although Michiru hates Yataro for his arrogance, he recalls when he was rejected as a child. When Yataro finally sees Michiru as a daughter, Michiru says her farewell as Musashi breaks the black stone. Two weeks later, a ceremony is held in honor of Awaji Island being liberated. Tatsuomi vows to Kojiro and Tsugumi that he could contact the captains of the Takeda, Tokugawa, Hojo and Date Bands to investigate any records of Jisai Kanemaki. Michiru is allowed to spend time with Musashi around town for one day. Musashi later buys a ring for Michiru, and they watch the sunset by the seaside as Michiru starts to deteriorate and wither into her kitetsu blade. While sleeping, Katsumi falls into a pit, where he is surrounded by the Obsidian Eight. Musashi, Kojiro and Tsugumi set off on their next journey.

== Reception ==
In a dual review for Anime News Network's "Spring 2020 Manga Guide", Rebecca Silverman gave the first volume three-and-a-half out of five stars, praising its use of Buddhist imagery in demon designs and the maturing of author Ohtaka's art style, which avoided the juvenile humor of her earlier works. Conversely, Faye Hopper rated the same volume two-and-a-half stars, commending the artwork but criticizing the narrative as disorganized and poorly paced, with underdeveloped characters and a lack of tension that caused the series to lose its initial momentum.
