= Compass (video game) =

2016 mobile video game

- Compass: Combat Providence Analysis System

#コンパス【戦闘摂理解析システム】 (#Konpasu [Sentō Setsuri Kaiseki Shisutemu])
- Video game
- Developer: Dwango
- Publisher: NHN PlayArt
- Genre: Multiplayer online battle arena
- Platform: iOS, Android, Amazon Fire
- Released: JP: December 17, 2016; CHN: November 11, 2019
- Original net animation
- Directed by: Various
- Studio: Echoes; TMS Entertainment
- Released: August 10, 2018 – September 13, 2019
- Runtime: 4 minutes
- Episodes: 10
- Manga

Alkali Rettōsei
- Written by: Kinosaki
- Illustrated by: Mahiro Satou
- Published by: Media Factory
- Magazine: Monthly Comic Gene
- Original run: August 12, 2023 – present
- Volumes: 1
- Light novel
- Written by: Kinosaki
- Illustrated by: Kurowa
- Published by: Media Factory
- Imprint: MF Bunko J
- Published: August 25, 2023
- Anime television series

#Compass 2.0: Combat Providence Analysis System
- Directed by: Hitoshi Nanba
- Written by: Naohiro Fukushima; Mehikari Ōkawa
- Studio: Lay-duce
- Licensed by: Crunchyroll
- Original network: TXN (TV Tokyo), BS NTV, AT-X
- Original run: April 8, 2025 – June 24, 2025
- Episodes: 12

Compass: Combat Providence Analysis System (#コンパス【戦闘摂理解析システム】, #Konpasu [Sentō Setsuri Kaiseki Shisutemu]) is a Japanese multiplayer online battle arena video game created by NHN PlayArt and Dwango. It was released for iOS, Android, and Amazon Fire devices in December 2016 in Japan and in November 2019 in China. A 10-episode original net animation (ONA) adaptation was streamed on YouTube from August 2018 to September 2019. An anime television series adaptation by Lay-duce, titled #Compass 2.0: Combat Providence Analysis System, aired from April to June 2025.

== Characters ==
13 (サーティーン)
Voiced by: Daisuke Ono
A death god who was once an angel.
Reiya (零夜)
Voiced by: Soma Saito
The head of the Mystic Mirage Messengers (MMM) secret society, who is on the run from public security.
Jeanne d'Arc (ジャンヌ ダルク, Jan'nu Daruku)
Voiced by: Sora Amamiya
A healer wielding a blue battle standard, based on the historical figure of the same name.
Voidoll
Voiced by: Sakura Tange
The robot managing the Compass battle arena, who observes how humans fight. Sakura Tange voices her irregular counterpart, Bugdoll, which serves as her evil counterpart.
Atari Jūmonji (十文字アタリ, Jūmonji Atari)
Voiced by: Yoshitaka Yamaya
Justice Hancock (ジャスティス ハンコック, Jasutisu Hankokku)
Voiced by: Yasuhiro Mamiya
Lyrica (リリカ, Ririka)
Voiced by: Shiki Aoki
The main character of a magical girl franchise called Magical Girl Ririka Ruruka, which is a pun on the Puella Magi Madoka Magica series.
Soubiki Noho (双挽乃保)
Voiced by: Reina Kondō
Tadaomi Ōka (桜華 忠臣, Ōka Tadaomi)
Voiced by: Tetsuya Kakihara
Marcos '55 (マルコス'55, Marukosu '55)
Voiced by: Hiro Shimono
Luciano (ルチアーノ, Ruchiāno)
Voiced by: Rikiya Koyama
Matoi Fukagawa (深川まとい, Fukagawa Matoi)
Voiced by: Marina Inoue
Gustav Heydrich (グスタフ ハイドリヒ, Gusutafu Haidorihi)
Voiced by: Kazuhiro Yamaji
Nikola Tesla (ニコラ テスラ, Nikora Tesura)
Voiced by: Ayumu Murase
Violetta Noire (ヴィオレッタ ノワール, Bioretta Nowāru)
Voiced by: Atsuko Tanaka
Coquelicot Blanche (コクリコット ブランシュ, Kokurikotto Buranshu)
Voiced by: Kokoa Amano
Maria S. Leonburg (マリア=S=レオンブルク, Maria S Reonburuku)
Voiced by: Yū Shimamura
Adam Yuriev (アダム ユーリエフ, Adamu Yūriefu)
Voiced by: Yoshitsugu Matsuoka
Meg Meg (メグメグ, Megumegu)
Voiced by: Ayane Sakura
Istaqa (イスタカ, Isutaka)
Voiced by: Nobutoshi Canna
Kirara Kiryuin (輝龍院きらら, Kiryuin Kirara)
Voiced by: Eri Kitamura
Pololocho (ポロロッチョ, Pororotcho)
Voiced by: Jun Fukuyama
Thorn Yuriev (ソーン ユーリエフ, Sōn Yūriefu)
Voiced by: Kōhei Amasaki
Delmin (デルミン, Derumin)
Voiced by: Misaki Watada
Thomas (トマス, Tomasu)
Voiced by: Banjō Ginga
Ruruka (ルルカ)
Voiced by: Kana Ichinose
Pierre the 77th (ピエール77世, Pieru 77-sei)
Voiced by: Tomokazu Sugita
Amairo Kitsunegasaki (狐ヶ咲甘色, Kitsunegasaki Amairo)
Voiced by: Kana Hanazawa
System Voice (システムボイス, Shistemu Boisu)
Voiced by: Yuzuki Yukari

== Other media ==
=== Anime ===
A 10-episode original net animation (ONA) adaptation produced by Echoes and TMS Entertainment was streamed on YouTube from August 10, 2018, to September 13, 2019.

An anime television series adaptation titled #Compass 2.0: Combat Providence Analysis System, produced by Lay-duce and directed by Hitoshi Nanba, aired from April 8 to June 24, 2025, on TV Tokyo and its affiliates. (Note: TV Tokyo lists the series premiere on April 7, 2025, at 24:00, which is effectively April 8 at midnight JST.) The opening theme song is "Hakudō" (拍動; Pulse), performed by Nana Mizuki, while the ending theme song is "Heartache" (ハートエイク), performed by Yuma Uchida. Crunchyroll streamed the series.

==== Episodes ====
No.	Title	Directed by (Note: Production staff information is taken from the ending credits of each episode.)	Written by	Storyboarded by	Original release date
1	"This is #COMPASS2.0"; Transliteration: "Kokoha #Konpasu Ni.Ten.Zero" (Japanese: ココハ #コンパス2.0)	Daiki Nakamura	Naohiro Fukushima	Hitoshi Nanba, Wazuka Komamiya	April 8, 2025
2	"Will You Be My Partner?"; Transliteration: "Pātonā ni Narimasuka?" (Japanese: パートナー ニ ナリマスカ？)	Wazuka Komimiya	Naohiro Fukushima	Wazuka Komamiya	April 15, 2025
3	"A Comrade in Trouble"; Transliteration: "Nakama no Pinchidesu" (Japanese: ナカマ ノ ピンチデス)	Takeshi Ando	Saki Kawamura	Daiki Nakamura	April 22, 2025
4	"Chasing the Mastermind"; Transliteration: "Kuromaku wo Oikakete" (Japanese: クロマク ヲ オイカケテ)	Motomu Hagiwara, Tsutomu Yabuki	Kazuki Nishitani	Hajime Asagaya	April 29, 2025
5	"Defeat the Irregular"; Transliteration: "Iregyurā wo Tao se" (Japanese: イレギュラー ヲ タオセ)	Akiko Seki	Naohiro Fukushima	Susumu Nishizawa	May 6, 2025
6	"Something is Chasing After Us"; Transliteration: "Nanika ga Ottekimasu" (Japanese: ナニカ ガ オッテキマス)	Satomi Nakamura, Yasuhiro Sugimura	Saki Kawamura	Hitoshi Nanba	May 13, 2025
7	"Please Remember"; Transliteration: "Omoidashite Kudasai" (Japanese: オモイダシテ クダサイ)	Daiki Nakamura	Naohiro Fukushima, Kazuki Nishitani	Daiki Nakamura	May 20, 2025
8	"Aim for the Tower"; Transliteration: "Tawā wo Mezashite" (Japanese: タワー ヲ メザシテ)	Takushi Shikatani	Saki Kawamura	Susumu Nishizawa	May 27, 2025
9	"I Want to See You Again"; Transliteration: "Mōichido Aitai" (Japanese: モウイチド アイタイ)	Tsutomu Yabuki	Naohiro Fukushima	Hajime Asagaya	June 3, 2025
10	"We Will Begin Anew"; Transliteration: "Atarashiku Hajime Masu" (Japanese: アタラシク ハジメマス)	Shigeki Awai, Yasuhiro Sugimura	Naohiro Fukushima	Hitoshi Nanba	June 10, 2025
11	"Here I Am"; Transliteration: "Watashi Ha Kokonīru" (Japanese: ワタシ ハ ココニイル)	Satomi Nakamura	Naohiro Fukushima	Satomi Nakamura, Hitoshi Nanba	June 17, 2025
12	"So, the Connecting World"; Transliteration: "Soshite Tsunagaru Sekai" (Japanese: ソシテ ツナガル セカイ)	Daiki Nakamura	Saki Kawamura	Hitoshi Nanba, Daiki Nakamura	June 24, 2025

=== Print ===
A manga adaptation based on "Alkali Rettōsei", written by Kinosaki and illustrated by Mahiro Satou, began serialization in Media Factory's Monthly Comic Gene magazine on August 12, 2023. A single volume has been released as of March 2024.

A spin-off light novel also based on "Alkali Rettōsei", written by Kinosaki and illustrated by Kurowa, was published under Media Factory's MF Bunko J light novel imprint on August 25, 2023.
