= Please Excuse My Younger Brothers =

Japanese manga series

- First tankōbon volume cover

うちの弟どもがすみません (Uchi no Otōto-domo ga Sumimasen)
- Genre: Romantic comedy
- Manga
- Written by: Akira Ozaki
- Published by: Shueisha
- Imprint: Margaret Comics
- Magazine: Bessatsu Margaret
- Original run: January 11, 2020 – present
- Volumes: 15
- Live-action film
- Directed by: Koichiro Miki
- Written by: Rika Nezu
- Music by: Kotringo
- Studio: Shochiku Studio
- Released: December 6, 2024
- Runtime: 105 minutes
- Anime television series
- Directed by: Hitoshi Nanba
- Written by: Megumi Shimizu
- Music by: Gin (Busted Rose)
- Studio: Lay-duce
- Licensed by: Crunchyroll; SEA: Medialink
- Original network: Tokyo MX, GTV, GYT, BS11, ABC
- Original run: July 4, 2026 – present
- Episodes: 24
- icon

Please Excuse My Younger Brothers (うちの弟どもがすみません, Uchi no Otōto-domo ga Sumimasen) is a Japanese manga series written and illustrated by Akira Ozaki. It began serialization in Shueisha's shōjo manga magazine Bessatsu Margaret in January 2020. A live-action film adaptation premiered in Japanese theaters in December 2024. An anime television series adaptation produced by Lay-duce premiered in July 2026.

== Plot ==
After attending high school for one year, Ito Narita has to move due to her mother getting remarried. Following the move, Ito finds out that she has four younger brothers: Gen, Raku, Shū, and Rui. She initially struggles to get accustomed to her brothers, but she finds out that they're kind, especially the oldest, Gen.

== Characters ==
Ito Narita (成田糸, Narita Ito)
Voiced by: Kaede Hondo (vomic), Naomi Ōzora (anime)
Portrayed by: Mei Hata
Ito is the main protagonist aged 16 who attends high school. She starts her second year of high school with Gen as they are the same age.
Gen Narita (成田源, Narita Gen)
Voiced by: Yuma Uchida (vomic), Toshiki Masuda (anime)
Portrayed by: Ryuto Sakuma
Gen is Ito's taciturn first younger brother. He is enrolled in the same classroom as Ito. His birthday comes a day after Ito's.
Raku Narita (成田洛, Narita Raku)
Voiced by: Junta Terashima (vomic), Taku Yashiro (anime)
Portrayed by: Yuto Nasu
Raku is Ito's second younger brother. At the start of the anime, he begins attending his sophomore year of high school.
Shū Narita (成田柊, Narita Shū)
Voiced by: Miyu Irino (vomic), Kensho Ono (anime)
Portrayed by: Nao Oriyama
Shū is Ito's third younger brother. He is shy and known as the "shut-in" brother.
Rui Narita (成田類, Narita Rui)
Voiced by: Atsumi Tanezaki (vomic), Momoka Terasawa (anime)
Portrayed by: Kanon Uchida
Rui is Ito's youngest brother. At the start of the anime, he attends third grade.
Isao Narita (成田勲, Narita Isao)
Voiced by: Kazuya Nakai (vomic), Daisuke Ono (anime)
Portrayed by: Akira Kawashima
Isao is Ito's step-father and the Narita brothers' biological father.
Saho Narita (成田さほ, Narita Saho)
Voiced by: Mikako Takahashi (vomic), Aya Endō (anime)
Portrayed by: Yuko Fueki
Saho is Ito's mother who remarried to Isao, which makes her step-mother to the four Narita brothers.
Azusa Yashiro (八代梓, Yashiro Azusa)
Voiced by: Yoko Hikasa

== Media ==
=== Manga ===
Written and illustrated by Akira Ozaki, Please Excuse My Younger Brothers began serialization in Shueisha's shōjo manga magazine Bessatsu Margaret on January 11, 2020, with its chapters collected into fifteen tankōbon volumes as of June 2026.

==== Volumes ====
No.	Release date	ISBN
1	May 25, 2020	978-4-08-844346-1
2	September 25, 2020	978-4-08-844374-4
3	January 25, 2021	978-4-08-844434-5
4	May 25, 2021	978-4-08-844486-4
5	October 25, 2021	978-4-08-844529-8
6	February 25, 2022	978-4-08-844580-9
7	June 23, 2022	978-4-08-844581-6
8	November 25, 2022	978-4-08-844645-5
9	March 24, 2023	978-4-08-844709-4
10	July 25, 2023	978-4-08-844786-5
11	February 22, 2024	978-4-08-844863-3
12	July 25, 2024	978-4-08-843020-1
13	January 23, 2025	978-4-08-843087-4
14	July 25, 2025	978-4-08-843157-4
15	June 25, 2026	978-4-08-843212-0

=== Live-action film ===
A live-action film adaptation was announced on July 9, 2024. It is produced by Shochiku and directed by Koichiro Miki, with scripts written by Rika Nezu and music composed by Kotringo. The film premiered in Japanese theaters on December 6, 2024. The theme song "Koi no 8-byō Rule" (恋の8秒ルール), performed by Noa.

=== Anime ===
An anime television series adaptation was announced on December 6, 2025. It is produced by Lay-duce and directed by Hitoshi Nanba, with series composition handled by Megumi Shimizu, characters designed by Shiori Hiraiwa and Yōko Fukushima, and music composed by Gin (from Busted Rose). The series premiered on July 4, 2026, on Tokyo MX and other networks, and will run for two consecutive cours for a total of 24 episodes. (Note: Tokyo MX listed the series premiere on July 3 at 24:00, which is effectively July 4 at midnight JST.) For the first cours, the opening theme song is "Aikotoba" (アイコトバ), performed by Dish, while the ending theme song is "Clover", performed by Reira Ushio. For the second cours, the opening theme song is "LOVE & LIKE", performed by Neguse, while the ending theme song is "Mabataki" (まばたき), performed by Me Minor. Crunchyroll is streaming the series. Medialink licensed the series in Southeast Asia.

==== Episodes ====
No.	Title	Directed by	Written by	Storyboarded by	Original release date
1	"Welcome to the Narita Family"; Transliteration: "Yōkoso Narita-ka e" (Japanese: ようこそ成田家へ)	Daiki Nakamura	Megumi Shimizu	Namimi Sanjō	July 4, 2026
2	"Lies Make Families"; Transliteration: "Usotsuki wa Kazoku no Hajimari" (Japanese: 嘘つきは家族のはじまり)	Satomi Nakamura	Megumi Shimizu	Satomi Nakamura	July 11, 2026
3	"The Narita Family's New Rule"; Transliteration: "Narita-ka no Shin Rūru" (Japanese: 成田家の新ルール)	Yoshihiro Takamoto	Kazuki Nishitani	Ai Yoshimura	July 18, 2026
4	"Unable to Be Honest"; Transliteration: "Sunao ni Narenakute" (Japanese: 素直になれなくて)	Daiki Nakamura	Megumi Shimizu	Yūko Horikawa	July 25, 2026
5	"Shut Away Angel"; Transliteration: "Tojikomotta Tenshi" (Japanese: 閉じこもった天使)	Seo Hye-jin	Kazuki Nishitani	Namimi Sanjō & Michio Fukuda	August 1, 2026
6	"Siblings' Feelings"; Transliteration: "Kyōdai no Omoi" (Japanese: きょうだいの想い)	Hodaka Koramoto	Megumi Shimizu	Michio Fukuda	August 8, 2026
7	"My Younger Brother Is a Prince?"; Transliteration: "Otōto ga Ōjisama?" (Japanese: 弟が王子様？)	Satomi Nakamura	Megumi Shimizu	Noriaki Saitō	August 15, 2026
8	"What'll Happen to the Cultural Festival?!"; Transliteration: "Dō Naru Bunkasai!?" (Japanese: どうなる文化祭⁉)	Daiki Nakamura	Megumi Shimizu	Hiroaki Sakurai	August 22, 2026
9	"The Birthday Present Bonus"; Transliteration: "Tanjōbi Purezento no omake" (Japanese: 誕生日プレゼントのおまけ)	Satoshi Toba	Kazuki Nishitani	Sutekichi Yukio	August 29, 2026
10	"A Sign of Connection"; Transliteration: "Tsunagari no Akashi" (Japanese: 繋がりの証)	Kyoko Seki	Aiki Kawamura	Kyoko Seki	September 5, 2026
11	"The Hiroshima Onomichi Steam Incident"; Transliteration: "Hiroshima Onomichi Yukemuri Jiken" (Japanese: 広島尾道湯けむり事件)	Satoshi Toba	Megumi Shimizu	Namimi Sanjo	September 12, 2026
12	"Let the Memories Fall"; Transliteration: "Omoide yo Furi Tsumori" (Japanese: 思い出よ降りつもれ)	Daiki Nakamura	Megumi Shimizu	Satomi Nakamura	September 19, 2026
13	"Into the New Year! Valentines!"; Transliteration: "Nenmatsu Nenshi! Barentain!" (Japanese: 年末年始！バレンタイン！)	Tsutomu Yabuki	Megumi Shimizu	Namimi Sanjo	October 3, 2026
14	"This Love Can't Be Suppressed"; Transliteration: "Osaekirenai Koigokoro" (Japanese: おさえきれない恋心)	Shige Fukase	Megumi Shimizu	Hajime Asagaya	October 10, 2026
15	"How I Really Feel"; Transliteration: "Hontō no Kimochi" (Japanese: ほんとうの気持ち)	Takushi Shikatani	Megumi Shimizu	Noriaki Saitō	October 17, 2026
16	"The Troubled Narita Brothers"; Transliteration: "Nayameru Narita Kyōdai" (Japanese: 悩める成田きょうだい)	Yumeta Company & Akira Iwabuchi	Kazuki Nishitani	Tomoko Akiyama	October 24, 2026
17	"Clashing Thoughts"; Transliteration: "Butsukariau Omoi" (Japanese: ぶつかり合う想い)	Satomi Nakamura	Megumi Shimizu	Satomi Nakamura	October 31, 2026
18	"Piggy-back Fight! Brother vs Brother"; Transliteration: "Kibasen!! Otōto tai Otōto" (Japanese: 騎馬戦!!弟vs弟)	Daiki Nakamura	Megumi Shimizu	Yasuhiro Sugimura	November 7, 2026
19	"The True Power of the Oldest Brother"; Transliteration: "Chōnan no shin no Chikara" (Japanese: 長男の真の力)	Noriyuki Nakamura	Kazuki Nishitani	Hajime Asagaya	November 14, 2026
