= Shinobu Ohtaka =

Japanese manga artist

Shinobu Ohtaka 大高 忍
- Born: May 9, 1983 (age 43) Tokyo, Japan
- Notable works: Sumomomo, Momomo, Magi: The Labyrinth of Magic, Orient
- Awards: Shogakukan Manga Award (2014)

Shinobu Ohtaka (Japanese: 大高 忍, Hepburn: Ōtaka Shinobu; born May 9, 1983) is a Japanese manga artist. She is best known for her manga works Sumomomo, Momomo and Magi: The Labyrinth of Magic.

== Works ==
=== Publication ===
- Sumomomo, Momomo (すもももももも〜地上最強のヨメ〜, Sumomomo Momomo Chijō Saikyō no Yome) (2004–2009); serialized in Square Enix's Young Gangan.
- Magi: The Labyrinth of Magic (マギ, Magi) (2009–2017); serialized in Shogakukan's Weekly Shōnen Sunday.
  - Magi: Adventure of Sinbad (マギ シンドバッドの冒険, Magi Shindobaddo no Bōken) (illustrated by Yoshifumi Ohtera; 2013–2018); serialized in Shogakukan's Weekly Shōnen Sunday and later in Ura Sunday.
- Orient (オリエント, Oriento) (2018–2024); serialized in Kodansha's Weekly Shōnen Magazine and later in Bessatsu Shōnen Magazine.
- Geekrown (ギークラウン, Gīkuraun) (2026–scheduled); serialized in Kodansha's Magazine Pocket.

=== Anime ===
- Back Arrow (2021); original character designs.
