= Magi: The Labyrinth of Magic =

Japanese manga series by and its franchise

- First tankōbon volume cover, featuring Aladdin

マギ (Magi)
- Genre: Adventure; Coming-of-age; Fantasy
- Manga
- Written by: Shinobu Ohtaka
- Published by: Shogakukan
- English publisher: AUS: Madman Entertainment; NA: Viz Media; SG: Shogakukan Asia
- Imprint: Shōnen Sunday Comics
- Magazine: Weekly Shōnen Sunday
- Original run: June 3, 2009 – October 11, 2017
- Volumes: 37
- Anime television series
- Directed by: Koji Masunari; Naotaka Hayashi (Note: Series Unit Director (シリーズ演出))
- Produced by: Hiroo Maruyama; Tomoyuki Saitō; Tomonori Ochikoshi; Hiroyuki Shimizu; Shunsuke Saitō; Toshihiro Maeda (S2)
- Written by: Hiroyuki Yoshino
- Music by: Shirō Sagisu
- Studio: A-1 Pictures
- Licensed by: AUS: Madman Entertainment; NA: Aniplex of America; UK: Kazé UK
- Original network: JNN (MBS, TBS)
- English network: NA: Neon Alley
- Original run: October 7, 2012 – March 30, 2014
- Episodes: 50
- Prequel
- Magi: Adventure of Sinbad (2013–2018)
- icon

Magi: The Labyrinth of Magic (マギ, Magi) is a Japanese manga series written and illustrated by Shinobu Ohtaka. It was serialized in Shogakukan's shōnen manga magazine Weekly Shōnen Sunday from June 2009 to October 2017, with its chapters collected in 37 tankōbon volumes. In North America, the manga is licensed for English release by Viz Media.

Taking place in a fantasy world that borrows elements from One Thousand and One Nights, the story follows a young boy named Aladdin and his traveling companion Alibaba, who go on adventures conquering dungeons to obtain valuable items, metal vessels, and powerful hosts capable of harnessing magic known as djinns. Upon completing their first dungeon, Aladdin learns of his identity as the titular Magi destined to ordain Alibaba to inherit the throne. As a result, the two decide to continue their travels all while forging friendships and rivalries along the way.

A 25-episode anime television adaptation by A-1 Pictures aired from October 2012 to March 2013. It was followed by a second 25-episode season, Magi: The Kingdom of Magic, aired from October 2013 to March 2014. The anime series is licensed in North America by Aniplex of America. It was also licensed by Kazé in United Kingdom and by Madman Entertainment in Australia.

A spin-off prequel series, Magi: Adventure of Sinbad, written by Ohtaka and illustrated by Yoshifumi Ohtera, was serialized in Weekly Shōnen Sunday from May to June 2013, and later on Shogakukan's website Ura Sunday from September 2013 to April 2018.

In 2014, Magi: The Labyrinth of Magic received the 59th Shogakukan Manga Award for the shōnen category. By April 2018, the manga had over 25 million copies in circulation.

== Synopsis ==
=== Setting ===
The series is largely based on numerous stories from One Thousand and One Nights (Arabian Nights), most notably the tales of Aladdin, Ali Baba, and Sinbad the Sailor. The story is set in an alternate recreation of the ancient Old World with several regions and nations having some resemblances with real-life counterparts from that time. In this world, all living beings possess an essence known as Rukh (ルフ, Rufu) and when they die, this essence returns to the huge flow (also known as "guidance") of Rukh that gives life to all subsequent beings in an eternal cycle of rebirth called "Fate". Once a person is overcome with sadness, anger, and hopelessness, their Rukh becomes corrupted, unstable, and black, and deviates from the main guidance in a process known as "Fall into Depravity" (堕転, Daten).

There are also several magic castles full of treasures and traps known as "Dungeons", which are each the lair of a powerful magic being, a Djinn (ジン, Jin). Individuals that manage to overcome the trials of a Dungeon and earn the allegiance of its Djinn are known as Dungeon Capturers (迷宮(ダンジョン)攻略者, Danjon Kōryakusha), gaining the ability to use its powers infused in a personal item of theirs known as a "Metal Vessel" and create less potent "Household Vessels" for their companions as well.

People can use the Rukh in their bodies to create an energy known as Magoi (マゴイ) to power their magical weapons and abilities. This energy must be used with care, as despite the fact that an individual's magoi can be restored with feeding and rest, once fully exhausted it causes their death. Among those that can perform magic with their own Magoi there is a rare class of magicians known as Magi (マギ), that can also use Magoi from the Rukh around them, greatly increasing their capabilities. A Magi usually chooses Dungeon Capturers to offer guidance and protection making them into their King Vessels (王の器, Ō no Utsuwa). There are several nations in history that were founded or improved by the rule of such individuals.

=== Plot ===
Fourteen years before the story begins, a colossal dungeon emerges from the sea, drawing thousands who never return—until Aladdin, a boy harboring a Djinn named Ugo in his flute, and Alibaba Saluja, an ambitious young man, conquer it. Their journey starts when Alibaba, seeking to claim the dungeon Amon, allies with Aladdin after witnessing his power. Overcoming adversaries like the slaver Jamil and his warriors Morgiana and Goltas, they free Morgiana from mental enslavement. Upon victory, the Djinn Amon reveals Aladdin as a Magi, a guide to kings, and Alibaba as his chosen candidate. Forced to flee as the dungeon collapses, they separate: Aladdin is transported afar to learn his destiny, while Alibaba returns to Balbadd, using Amon's treasure to liberate slaves, including Morgiana.

Reuniting later, the trio encounters Sinbad, the legendary adventurer and king of Sindria. In Balbadd, Alibaba joins the Fog Troupe to oppose his tyrannical half-brother, Abhmad, and establishes a republic—only for the Kou Empire to annex the nation. Traveling to Sindria, they train to combat Al-Thamen, a clandestine group spreading chaos. With Hakuryuu Ren, a Kou prince, they conquer the dungeon Zagan before parting ways: Aladdin studies magic at Magnostadt Academy, Alibaba trains in the Reim Empire, Hakuryuu returns home, and Morgiana departs for the Dark Continent.

A year later, Aladdin and Alibaba reunite during a war against Magnostadt, whose leader unwittingly aids Al-Thamen's goal of reviving the destructive deity Ill Ilah. A global alliance forms to stop this, and at a subsequent summit, Aladdin reveals humanity's origins as transformed beings from another world, Alma-Torran. King Solomon, Aladdin's father, had sealed Ill Ilah and entrusted Ugo with creating their current world.

Hakuryuu and the Magi Judar then ignite a Kou civil war. Alibaba and Aladdin fail to sway Hakuryuu, now consumed by darkness, and a battle leaves Alibaba and Judar mortally wounded. Post-war, Sinbad enacts a plan for peace, while Alibaba is revived by Alma-Torran's people. Teaming with Judar, he learns from the Mother Dragon that Ill Ilah is corrupted by David, Solomon's father, who seeks godhood and manipulates Sinbad.

Three years later, Alibaba stabilizes Kou's economy and rejoins his friends to defeat Al-Thamen's leader, Arba. Sinbad, possessed by Arba, overthrows Ugo in the Sacred Palace and alters the Rukh system, equating happiness with death or transformation into Rukh. Though Alibaba's group negotiates a truce, David hijacks the palace, aiming to reduce all life to Rukh. Aladdin and the wandering Magi, Yunan, confront David, halting his control. Sinbad sacrifices himself to destroy David, ending the crisis. With the Magi system dissolved, nations unite for peace. Alibaba marries Morgiana, closing their arduous journey with hope for the future.

== Media ==
=== Manga ===
Written and illustrated by Shinobu Ohtaka, Magi: The Labyrinth of Magic was serialized in Shogakukan's shōnen manga magazine Weekly Shōnen Sunday from June 3, 2009, to October 11, 2017. Shogakukan collected its 369 individual chapters in 37 tankōbon volumes, released from December 18, 2009, to November 17, 2017.

In February 2013, Viz Media announced that it had licensed the manga for English release in North America. The 37 volumes were published from August 13, 2013, to August 13, 2019.

A spin-off prequel series, Magi: Adventure of Sinbad, written by Ohtaka and illustrated by Yoshifumi Ohtera, was released as an additional material with the first volume of the anime series. It was later expanded into a regular series, which was serialized in Weekly Shōnen Sunday from May 18 to June 26, 2013. It was then transferred over to Shogakukan's webcomic site Ura Sunday (also available later on the MangaONE app), being published from September 18, 2013, to April 25, 2018.

=== Anime ===
During the Shogakukan's Jisedai World Hobby Fair '12 Summer event in June 2012, an anime television adaptation was announced. Produced by A-1 Pictures, the series aired on MBS and TBS from October 7, 2012, to March 31, 2013. For the first 12 episodes, the opening theme song is "V.I.P." by SID and the ending theme song is "Yubi Bōenkyō" by Nogizaka46. From episode 13 onwards, the opening song is "Matataku Hoshi no Shita de" by Porno Graffitti and the ending is "The Bravery" by Supercell.

After the end of the first season, a second season, Magi: The Kingdom of Magic, was announced. The season aired from October 6, 2013, to March 30, 2014. For the first 13 episodes, the opening theme song is "Anniversary" by SID and the ending theme song is "Eden" by Aqua Timez, while from episode 14 onwards, the opening theme song is "Hikari" by Vivid and the ending theme song is "With You/With Me" by 9nine.

The series debuted in North America on October 10, 2012, on Crunchyroll and Hulu. Aniplex of America licensed the series and its English dub was streamed on Viz Media's Neon Alley service starting on October 18, 2013. In December 2019, Funimation added the series to its streaming service. It was licensed by Viz Media Europe in Europe, Kazé in the UK (distributed by Manga Entertainment), and by Madman Entertainment in Australia.

=== Video games ===
Magi: The Labyrinth of Beginnings (マギ はじまりの迷宮, Magi Hajimari no Meikyū) was released for the Nintendo 3DS. The game was produced by Bandai Namco Games and was released on February 21, 2013. The game got an update with more playable characters, a new dungeon and more story.

Magi: A Whole New World (マギ 新たなる世界, Magi Aratanaru no Sekai) is the sequel to The Labyrinth of Beginnings. It was released for the 3DS, and was announced in September 2013. The game was released on February 13, 2014.

A Mobage social card battle game, Magi: The Labyrinth of Fate (マギ 運命の迷宮, Magi Unmei no Meikyū), developed by Nexon for feature phones and smartphones, was released on November 21, 2012.

A RPG mobile game, Magi: Dungeons & Magic, was distributed by Nexon for smartphones and available from February 20, 2014, to September 17, 2015.

=== Stage play ===
In March 2022, it was announced that the series would receive a stage musical adaptation, titled Musical "Magi" – Dungeon Kumikyoku (ミュージカル『マギ』-迷宮組曲-, Myūjikaru Magi Danjon Kumikyoku), which ran at the Tennozu Galaxy Theater in Tokyo on June 3–12, 2022, and at the Morinomiya Piloti Hall in Osaka on June 18–19 of the same year. The cast included Yugo Miyajima as Aladdin, Hiroki Ino as Alibaba, Nana Okada as Morgiana, Mitshuhiro Nagatomo as Budel, Miho Sugimoto as Baba, Shо̄go Onozuka as Goltas, Shina Tanaka as Ren Hakuei, Akito Teshima as Judar, Daisuke Hirose as Kassim, Takuji Kawakubo as Jamil, and Toshiyuki Morikawa (voice appearance) as Ugo. Kо̄tarо̄ Yoshitani directed the musical, with screenplay by Sayaka Asai, music composed by Shuhei Kamimura and choreography handled by Mamoru. A second stage play was announced in March 2023, featuring the same cast and staff from the first one, and ran at Shinagawa Prince Hotel Stellar Ball in Tokyo from June 9 to 18 of the same year, and Morinomiya Piloti Hall in Osaka on June 24 and 25.

== Reception ==
Four months after the series' anime adaptation announcement in June 2012, the print circulation of the manga went from 3 million copies of the first 12 volumes to over 6.5 million copies of the first 14 volumes in October of the same year. By October 2013, the manga had over 13 million copies in circulation; over 18 million copies in circulation by May 2015; over 23 million copies in circulation by April 2016; and over 25 million copies in circulation by April 2018. In Japan, Magi: The Labyrinth of Magic was the ninth top selling manga series in 2012; fourth in 2013; eighth in 2014; 20th in 2015 and 2016; and 10th in 2017.

The series ranked 16th on Takarajimasha's Kono Manga ga Sugoi! list of best manga of 2013 for male readers. The series won the 59th Shogakukan Manga Award in the shōnen category in 2014. On TV Asahi's Manga Sōsenkyo 2021 poll, in which 150.000 people voted for their top 100 manga series, Magi: The Labyrinth of Magic ranked 75th.

In his review of the first volume of the manga, L.B Bryant noted "not only is it a shonen title but it's a GOOD shonen title" and recommended it be picked up. Rebecca Silverman of Anime News Network gave the first volume a B rating. She criticized its fanservice and noted the story felt more like a role-playing game than a manga, suggesting Ohtaka seemed uncertain about its direction. Silverman compared Aladdin to One Piece's Monkey D. Luffy, and praised Ohtaka's improved art since Sumomomo, Momomo. She concluded that while imperfect, the series is recommended for shōnen adventure fans. Leroy Douresseaux of Comic Book Bin also ranked the first volume as a B, and compared Ohtaka's art style to Yuuki Iinuma's Itsuwaribito. She described Magi as a "straight-forward, fun to read adventure, part Prince of Persia and part Raiders of the Lost Ark". Kelly Quinn of The B&N Sci-Fi and Fantasy Blog included the series on her list of "7 Butt-Kicking Shonen Manga by Women Writers".

IGN listed Magi: The Labyrinth of Magic among the best anime series of the 2010s, and wrote that it is "a fun watch and has a surprising amount of action for those that are fans of shonen".
