= Hitoshi Nanba =

Japanese anime director

- 難波日登志
- Born: Niigata Prefecture
- Other name: Namimi Sanjo
- Occupation: Anime director
- Years active: 1982–present
- Known for: Gosick, Golden Kamuy

Hitoshi Nanba (Japanese: 難波日登志, Hepburn: Nanba Hitoshi), also known by his pseudonym Namimi Sanjo, is a Japanese anime director. Nanba started working in the anime industry in 1982 and directed his first full series in 1989. Since then, some of the series he has directed include Heroman, Gosick, and Golden Kamuy.

== Biography ==
Hitoshi Nanba was born in Niigata Prefecture. He started working in the anime industry in 1982 and was put in charge of directing for the first time with Dash! Yonkuro in 1989. Following Dash! Yonkuro, he directed the anime adaptation of Gosick in 2011. In 2018, he was put in charge of the anime adaptation of Golden Kamuy.

== Works ==
=== TV series ===
- Dash! Yonkuro (1989–1990) (director)
- Jungle King Tar-chan (1993–1994) (director)
- Bonobono (1995–1996) (director)
- YAT Anshin! Uchū Ryokō (1996–1998) (director)
- Baki the Grappler (2001) (part 1 director)
- Heroman (2010) (director)
- Gosick (2011) (director)
- Our Love Has Always Been 10 Centimeters Apart (2017) (chief director)
- Golden Kamuy (2018–2020) (director)
- I-Chu: Halfway Through the Idol (2021) (director)
- Tomo-chan Is a Girl! (2023) (director, storyboard artist)
- #Compass 2.0: Combat Providence Analysis System (2025) (director)
- Please Excuse My Younger Brothers (2026) (director)

=== Films ===
- Fate/Grand Order: First Order (2016) (director)
- Fate/Grand Order: Moonlight/Lostroom (2017) (director)

=== Original video animation ===
- Hajime no Ippo: Mashiba vs Kimura (2003) (director)

=== Original net animation ===
- Rising Impact (2024) (director)
