= List of dams in Kumamoto Prefecture =

The following is a list of dams in Kumamoto Prefecture, Japan.

== List ==
Name	Location	Opened	Height (metres)	Image
Aburatani Dam		1975	82	
Akagi Dam				
Amagimi Dam		1970	39	
Arase Dam				
Fukasako Dam			19	
Funatsu Dam			25.5	
Hikawa Dam			58.5	
Himenokawauchi Dam		1987	21	
Ichifusa Dam		1959	78.5	
Ishiuchi Dam		1992	38.5	
Itsuwa Dam		1985	37.1	
Itsuwatobu Dam		2002	33.3	
Kamekawa Dam		1982	37	
Kawabe Dam			107.5	
Kono Dam		1959	21.2	
Kotsuura Dam		2004	54	
Kusuura Dam		1966	32	
Kuwanouchi Dam		1955	26.5	
Kyoragi Dam		1976	29.3	
Midorikawa Dam		1970	76.5	
Midorikawa Hojo Dam		1970	35	
Nishigochi Dam		1970	17.5	
Yairagi No.2 Dam		1984	36.1	
Ohkiribata Dam		1975	23	
Ohkubo Tameike Dam		1914	15	
Oso Dam		2019	69.9	
Otani Dam		1940	26.1	
Rogi Dam		2013	53	
Ryumon Dam			99.5	
Seiganji Dam		1978	60.5	
Setoishi Dam		1958	26.5	
Shiibaru Dam				
Shiki Dam		1973	36	
Shimouke Dam				
Shiraishizeki Dam				
Aso-Tateno Dam			90	
Tororo Dam			41.8	
Tsukaze Dam				
Uchidani Dam		1975	64	

== See also ==
- Media related to Dams in Kumamoto prefecture at Wikimedia Commons
