= Shirakawa =

Shirakawa (白川 or 白河) may refer to:

== People ==
- Shirakawa (surname)
- Emperor Shirakawa, an eleventh-century emperor of Japan

== Places ==
- Shirakawa, Fukushima, a city in Fukushima Prefecture, Japan
  - Shirakawa Domain, a feudal domain of Edo-period Japan
- Shirakawa, Gifu (town), a town in Gifu Prefecture, Japan
- Shirakawa, Gifu (village), a World Heritage site in Gifu Prefecture, Japan
- Shirakawa, a neighborhood of Koto, Tokyo
- Shirakawa, Miyagi, a town in Miyagi Prefecture, Japan
- Shirakawa River, a river in Kyoto
- Shirakawa River (Kumamoto), a river in Kumamoto
