= History of Kagoshima Prefecture =

The outline of the History of Kagoshima Prefecture, Japan is described herein.

== Etymology ==
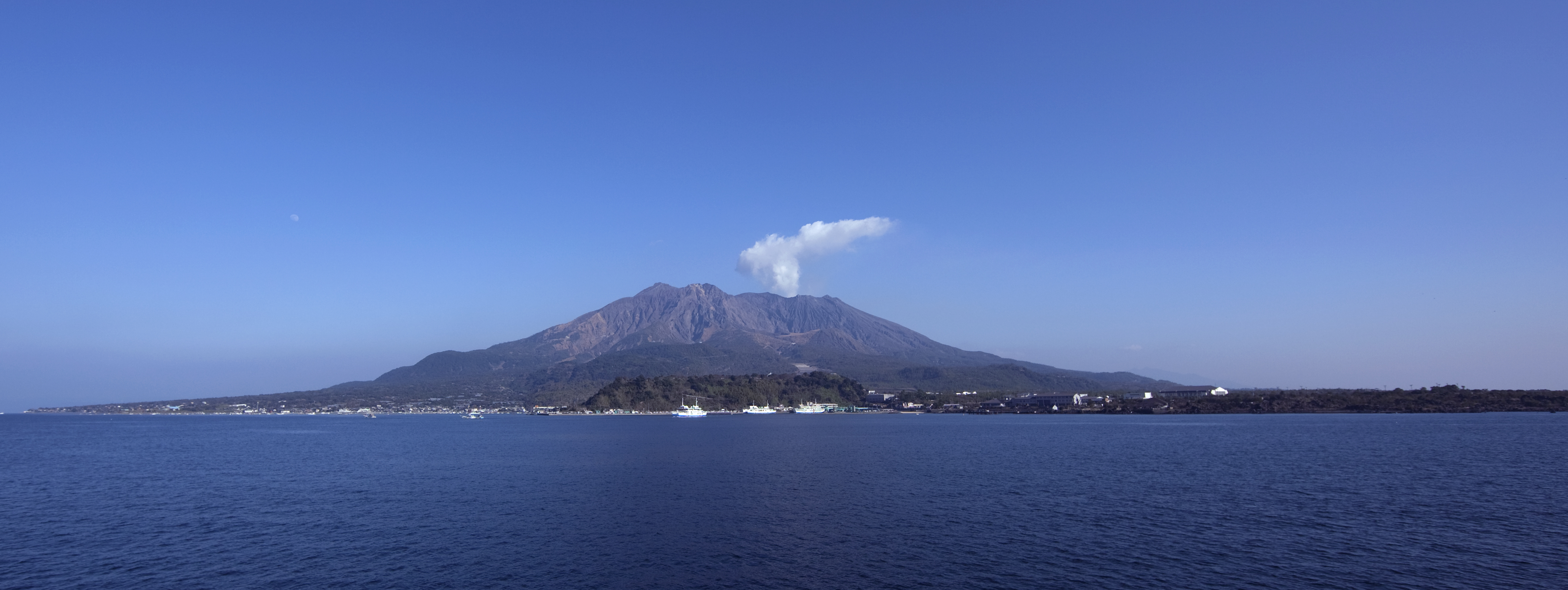
View of Sakurajima from mainland Kagoshima

The name "Kagoshima" came from Kagoshima Shrine situated in Hayato Town, Kirishima City. A number of theories exist as to the wider etymology of the name; in one, the name comes from a boat used by the mythical Hoori that was built in Kagoyama Mountain, with Hoori himself later enshrined on Kagoshima; in another, "kagoshima" comes from Sakurajima, a mountain encircled by cliffs and an old name of Kagoshima. Another theory posits that "kagoshima" means a kami (island) mountain, or an island where kami live.

Kagoshima-jingū 鹿児島神宮
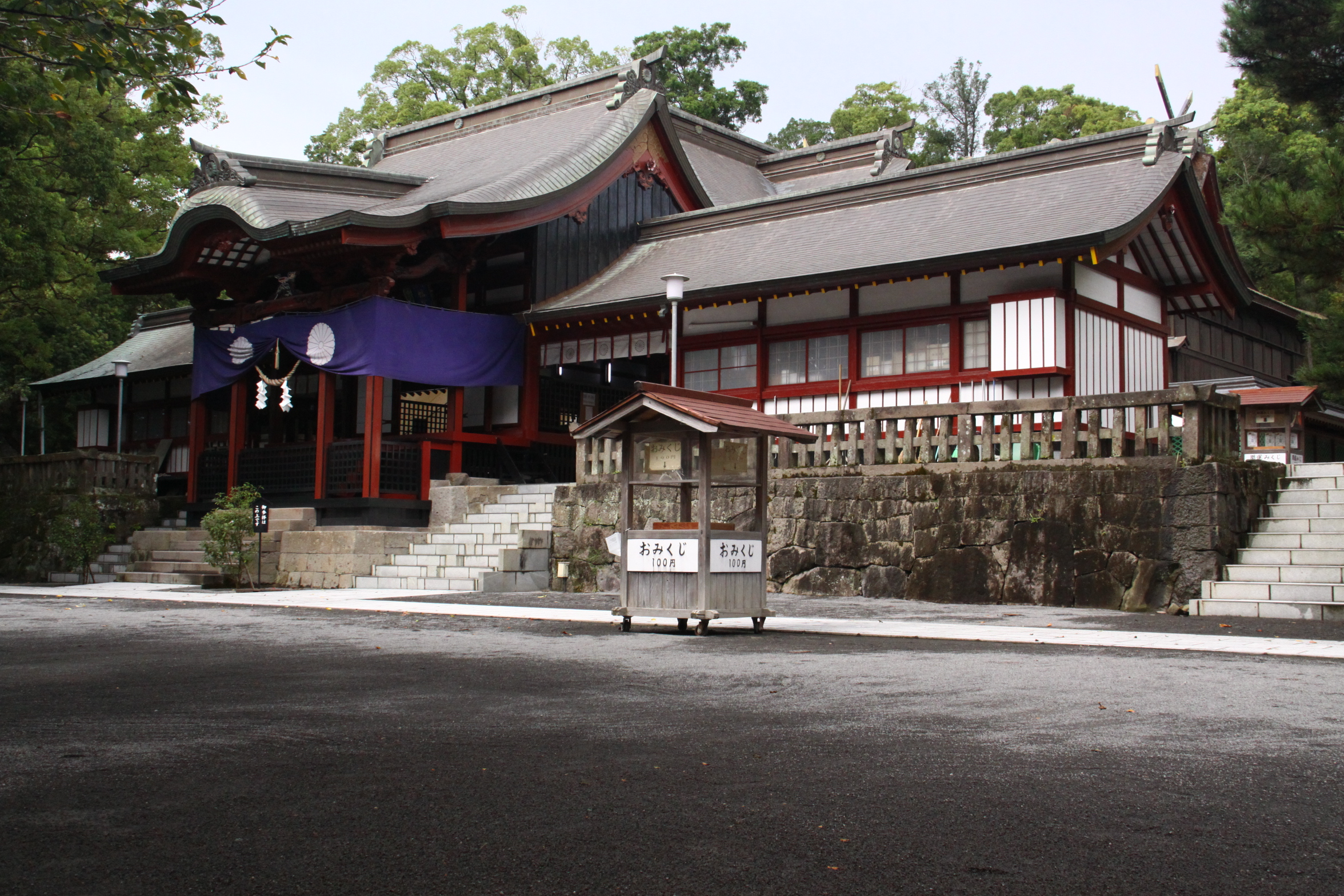

Religion
- Affiliation: Shinto
- Deity: Hoori; Toyotama-hime; Emperor Chūai; Emperor Ōjin; Empress Jingū

Location
- Location: 2496, Hayato-chō Uchi, Kirishima; Kagoshima 899-5116

== Prehistoric Kagoshima ==
About 24,000 years ago, Aira Caldera, corresponding to Kagoshima Bay and larger areas, erupted a number of times, with the volcanic ash reaching as far as Hokkaido as well as forming Shirasu-Daichi through pyroclastic flows. As of 2005, about 40 archaeological sites of the Lower Paleolithic era had been found in Kagoshima Prefecture. In Nakatane Machi, Kumage-gun, a camp site of the Lower Paleolithic era 31,000 years ago, sharpened stones and burned soil were found.

== Yamato Ōken and Kagoshima ==
Expanding Yamato Ōken (green) around the 7th century; Kagoshima Prefecture is in southernmost Kyushu, in black letters Kumaso and Hayato

There are various Japanese names for a political/governmental organization present starting in the 3rd century of the Kofun period in the Kinki area of Japan, composed of several powerful families, with the Ō (king) or Ōkimi (great king) as its center. These names include Yamato Chōtei (Court), Yamato Ōken, Wa Ōken, and Yamato Seiken. Kagoshima had been long regarded as a foreign country. Hayato people made underground tombs. Under the influence of Yamato Ōken, Satsuma Local Country was established in 702 and Osumi Local Country was established in 713. However, Hayato people were not friendly with the Yamato Ōken.

== Shimazu Tadahisa, the founder of the Shimazu clan ==
In 1185, Shimazu Tadahisa (died August 1, 1227) was the founder of the Shimazu clan. As a close retainer of Minamoto no Yoritomo, the founder of the Kamakura shogunate, he was appointed as jitō (land steward) of Shimazu Estate in 1185, from which he took the clan name. The Shimazu clan occupied the positions of shugo (military governor) of Satsuma, Ōsumi and Hyūga Provinces.

== Wakō, the Portuguese, Francis Xavier and the introduction of firearms ==
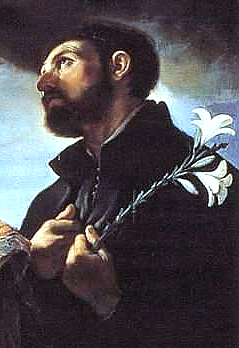
Francisco de Jasso y Azpilicueta (7 April 1506 – 3 December 1552)

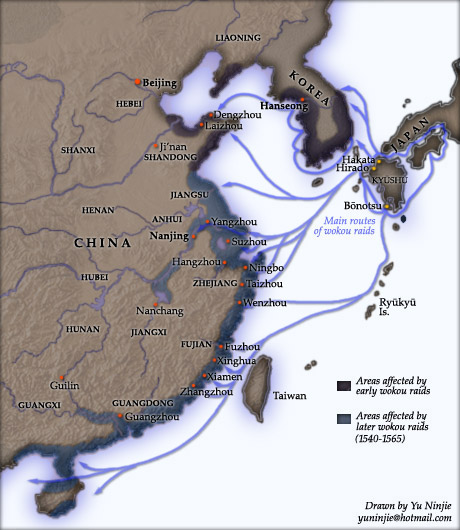
16th-century Japanese pirate raids

In the medieval age, Wokou, meaning Japanese pirates, raided the coastlines of China and Korea from the 13th century onwards. In Kagoshima Prefecture, Wokou departed from Bōnotsu and Uchinoura ports. In 1543, a gun was firstly imported into Tanegashima when the Portuguese, the first Europeans, arrived in Japan, which later revolutionized warfare in the country. Francis Xavier, born Francisco de Jasso y Azpilicueta (7 April 1506 – 3 December 1552) was a pioneering Roman Catholic missionary born in Navarra and co-founder of the Society of Jesus. In 1549, under the patronage of Portuguese King, he landed at Kagoshima and started missionary work. In 1574, the Kimotsuki clan of Ōsumi Province was defeated and in 1577, Ito of Hyūga Province was also defeated and the Shimazu clan unified the southern three provinces of Kyushu. In 1587, Toyotomi Hideyoshi won over the Shimazu clan and the Shimazu clan survived only in Satsuma and Osumi areas. Near the end of the 16th century, Japanese feudal leader Toyotomi Hideyoshi ordered the Ryukyu Kingdom to support Hideyoshi's invasions of Korea with men and arms.

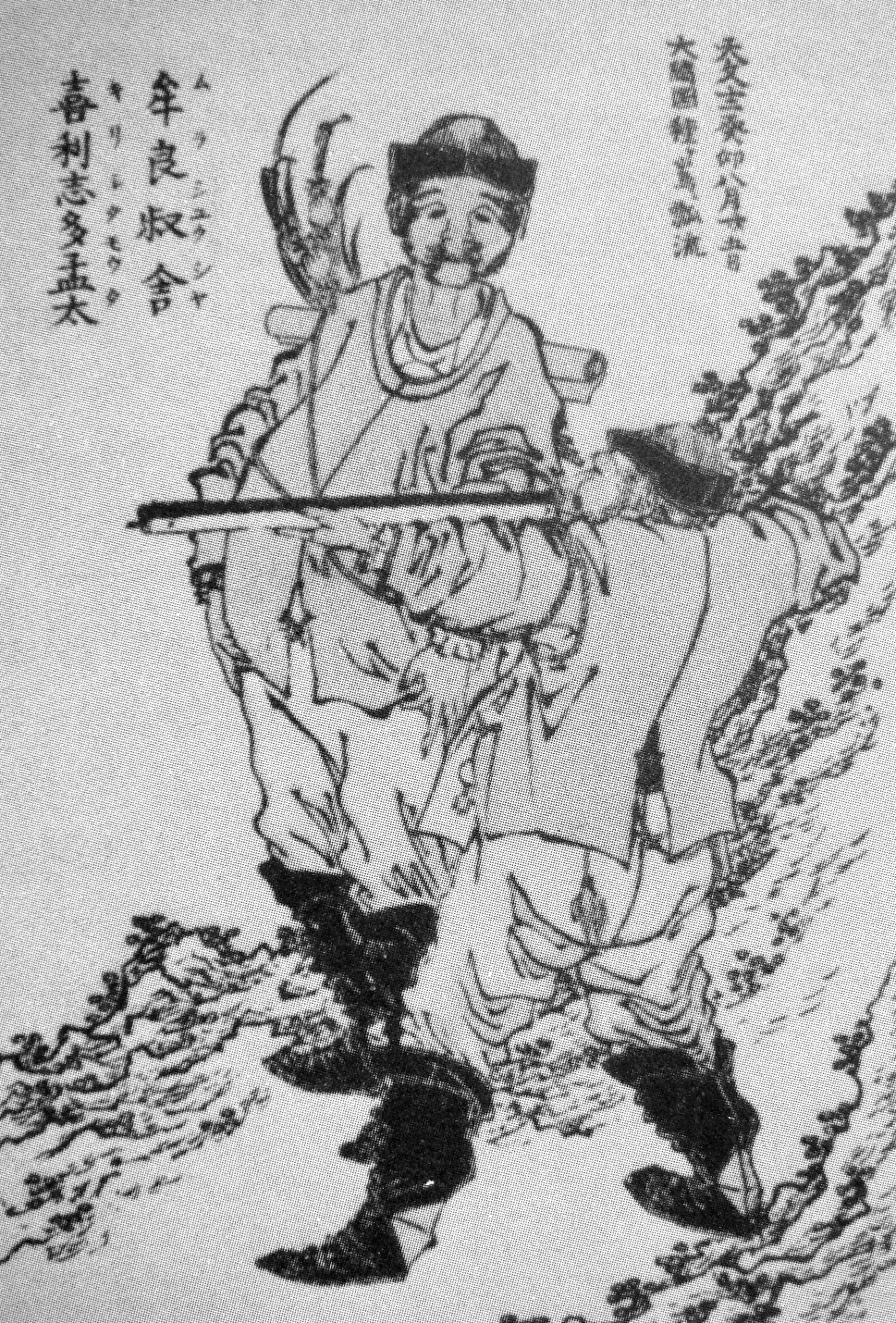
On August 25, 1543 a gun was imported into Tanegashima, which revolutinalized warfare in Japan. Murashukusha and Kirishimota in a Chinese document

== Conquest of the Ryukyu Kingdom ==
With the approval of the Tokugawa shogunate, the Satsuma Domain conquered the Ryukyu Kingdom in 1609. The Tokugawa shogunate decided to keep the small polity as a separate entity, with intent to make it work as a broker in the shogunate's failed attempt to establish diplomatic relations with China. After several twists and turns, Ryūkyū's position within the shogunate was finalized in 1634. Ryūkyū, with its kokudaka assessed as 123,700 koku, was officially recognized as part of the Satsuma Domain. As a result, Ryūkyū became Japan's one of four gateways to foreign countries. Under the direction of Satsuma, Ryūkyū's rulers continued to regularly pay tribute to the Chinese emperors, under the title of King of Chūzan of the State of Ryūkyū, concealing its vassalage to Satsuma.

== Satsuma Ware (Porcelain) and history ==
A Satsuma ware bowl from the Meiji or Taishō period (19th-early 20th century)

Satsuma ware or porcelain was originally developed by Korean potters, who came to Japan following the Japanese Invasion of Korea in the 17th century. The Prince of Satsuma brought potters from Korea, where they established a now famous kiln for making pottery. The ongoing patronage of the prince's family, the Shimazu family was the daimyōs (feudal lords) at the time that resulted in the great popularity of Satsuma porcelain. Production of Satsuma pottery is no longer limited to one area of Japan. The Shimazu family introduced the world to their beautiful earthenware pieces at the Paris International Exposition of 1867.

== Hōreki Age River Improvement Incident ==
The Hōreki Age River Improvement Incident or Nōbi Plain River Improvement Incident was a big project of Satsuma han which intended to divide the rivers into Kiso River, Nagara River and Ibi River, in Nagoya district between 1754 and 1755. These rivers were three big rivers which flowed in the Nōbi Plain with complicated geographical features and frequent floods. Tokugawa Ieshige, the 9th Edo shōgun ordered the river improvement construction works to be done by the Satsuma han, in order to weaken the Satsuma han. Hirata Yukie (1704–1755) a karō (house elder), accepted the construction works with 947 people. The works were tremendously difficult and 51 samurai died and 33 people died of disease during the construction works. Hirata Yukie committed seppuku for the great burden to the Satsuma han. Ironically, floods increased after the works and modern technology completed the works in the Meiji period under the direction of Johannis de Rijke (1842–1913) a Dutch civil engineer and advisor to Japanese government.

== Shimazu Nariakira ==
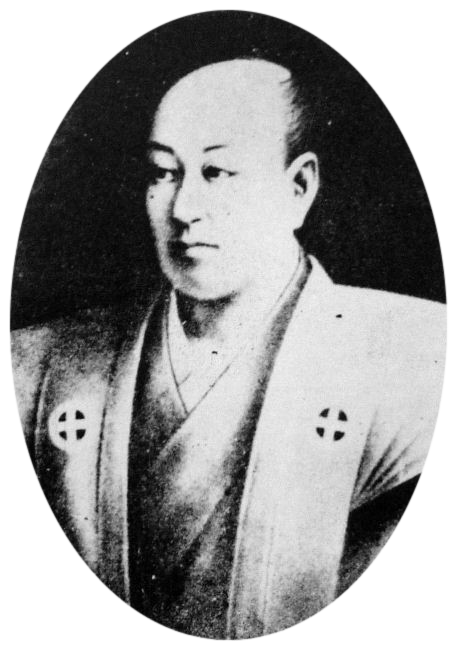
Shimazu Nariakira

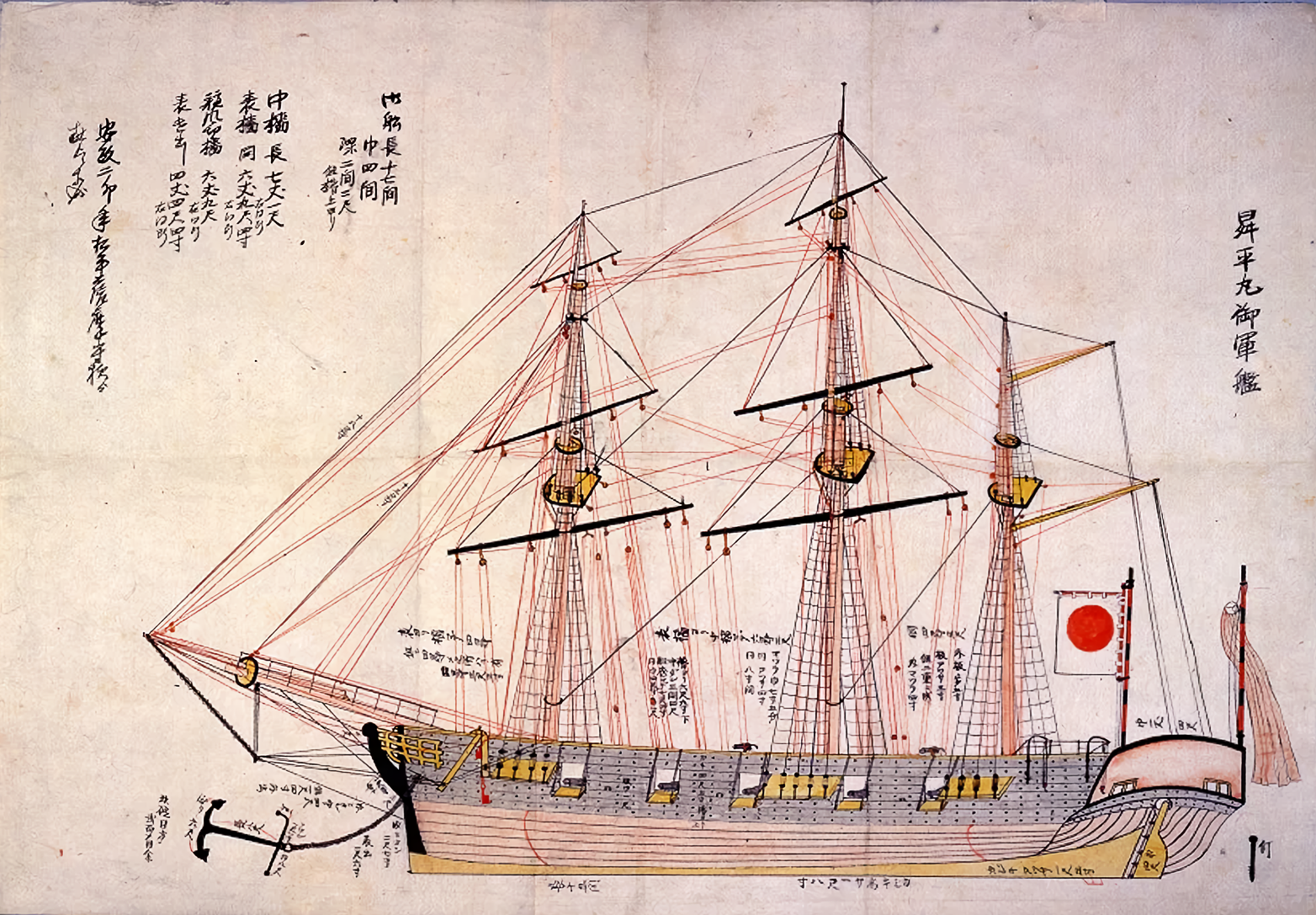

History

Japan
- Builder: Sakura-jima, Seto-Mura
- Laid down: 1853
- Launched: April 1854
- Commissioned: January 1855
- Decommissioned: 1870
- Fate: Wrecked, 1870

General characteristics
- Propulsion: 3-masted sailing ship
- Armament: 10 guns

Shimazu Nariakira (1809–1858) was an influential daimyō of Satsuma. After he became daimyō of Satsuma, Nariakira had Minayoshi Hotoku, a Satsuma physician, to build the Iroha-maru, one of the first Western-style ships built in Japan. It was based on Minayoshi's 6-foot-long (180 cm), 3-foot-wide (91 cm) model. Nariakira then built a shipyard for Western-style shipbuilding at Sakurajima. He also began enacting educational changes in Satsuma geared at bringing in Western science and technology. Nariakira established the Rangaku Koshujo, a school for the study of the Dutch language and Western culture. He would frequently visit schools and ask students to explain the meaning of the Confucian texts, to ensure that their Western learning did not corrupt their sense of nationalism. So strong was Nariakira's desire to raise well-educated youths that he set aside four koku annually to feed starving scholars, essentially a form of financial aid or scholarship. The Shūseikan (集成館) industrial area established by Shimazu Nariakira in 1852 in Iso, Satsuma Province.

Shōhei Maru (Japanese: 昇平丸) was Japan's first Western-style warship following the country's period of seclusion. She was ordered in 1852 by the government of the shōgun to the southern fief of Satsuma in the island of Kyūshū, in anticipation of the announced mission of Commodore Perry in 1853.

== Tokugawa shogunate, powerful Satsuma clan and Satsuma rebellion ==
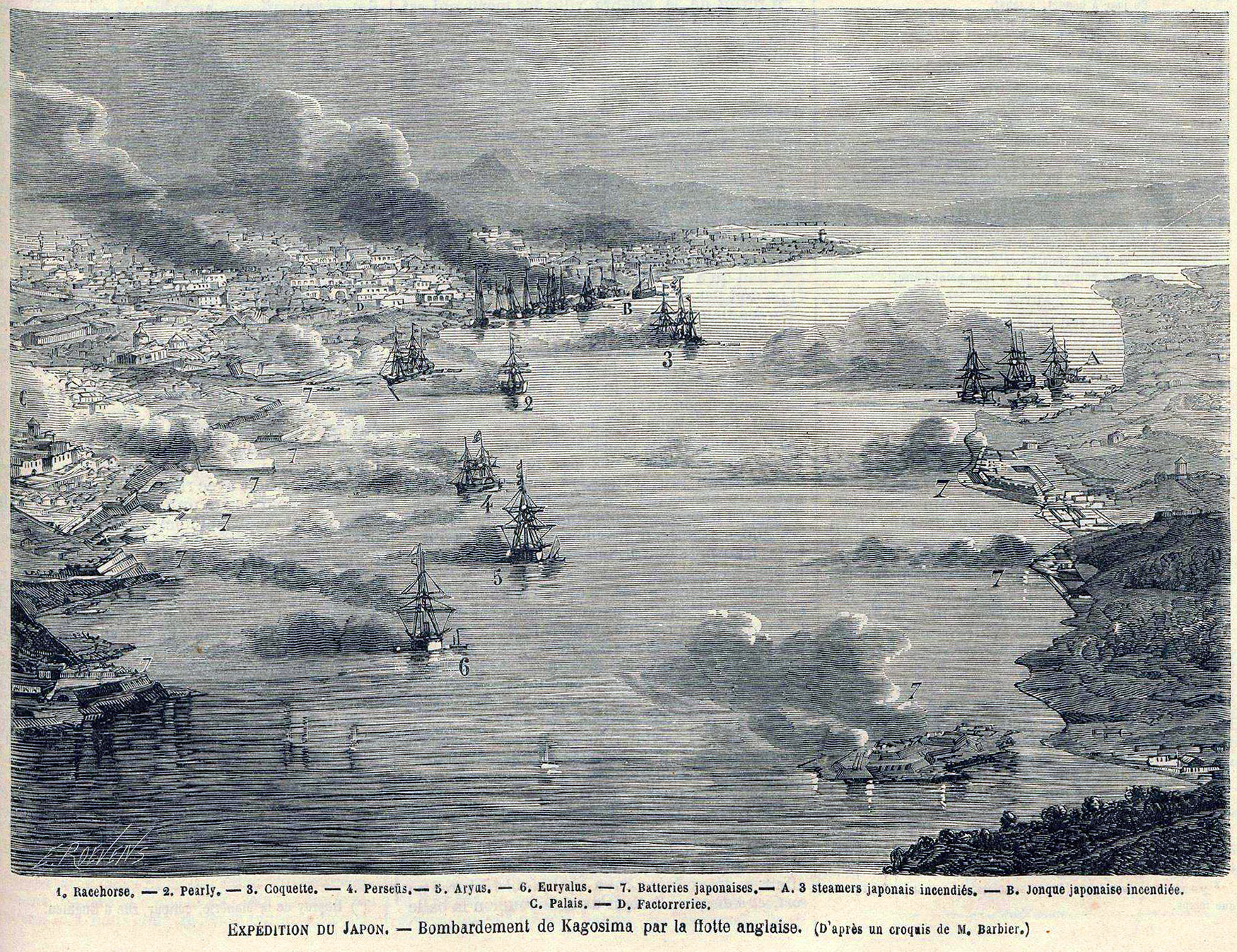
Bombardment of Kagoshima

Toward the end of the Tokugawa shogunate, namely the bakumatsu in which the Shimazu clan played an important role, there have been a chain of events such, bombardment of Kagoshima, also known as the Anglo-Satsuma War (Satsu-Ei Sensō), which took place on 15–17 August 1863 during the Late Tokugawa shogunate, Meiji Restoration (1868), abolition of the han system (1871) and Satsuma Rebellion (1877). In 1872, the Ryukyu islands were made the Ryukyu han. The Sword Abolishment Edict and the abolishment of the Samurai system were issued in 1876, and samurai were angered and became furious. Saigō Takamori, the hero and leader of Meiji Restoration left the central Meiji Government and returned to Kagoshima, with dissatisfied samurai. In 1877, Satsuma Rebellion army went up to Kumamoto, but could not invade the Kumamoto Castle and Saigō committed seppuku at his native place Kagoshima. In 1883, Kagoshima Prefecture was founded after the re-establishment of Miyazaki Prefecture. In 1914, Mt. Sakurajima erupted and the island of Sakurajima connected with the Osumi Peninsula.

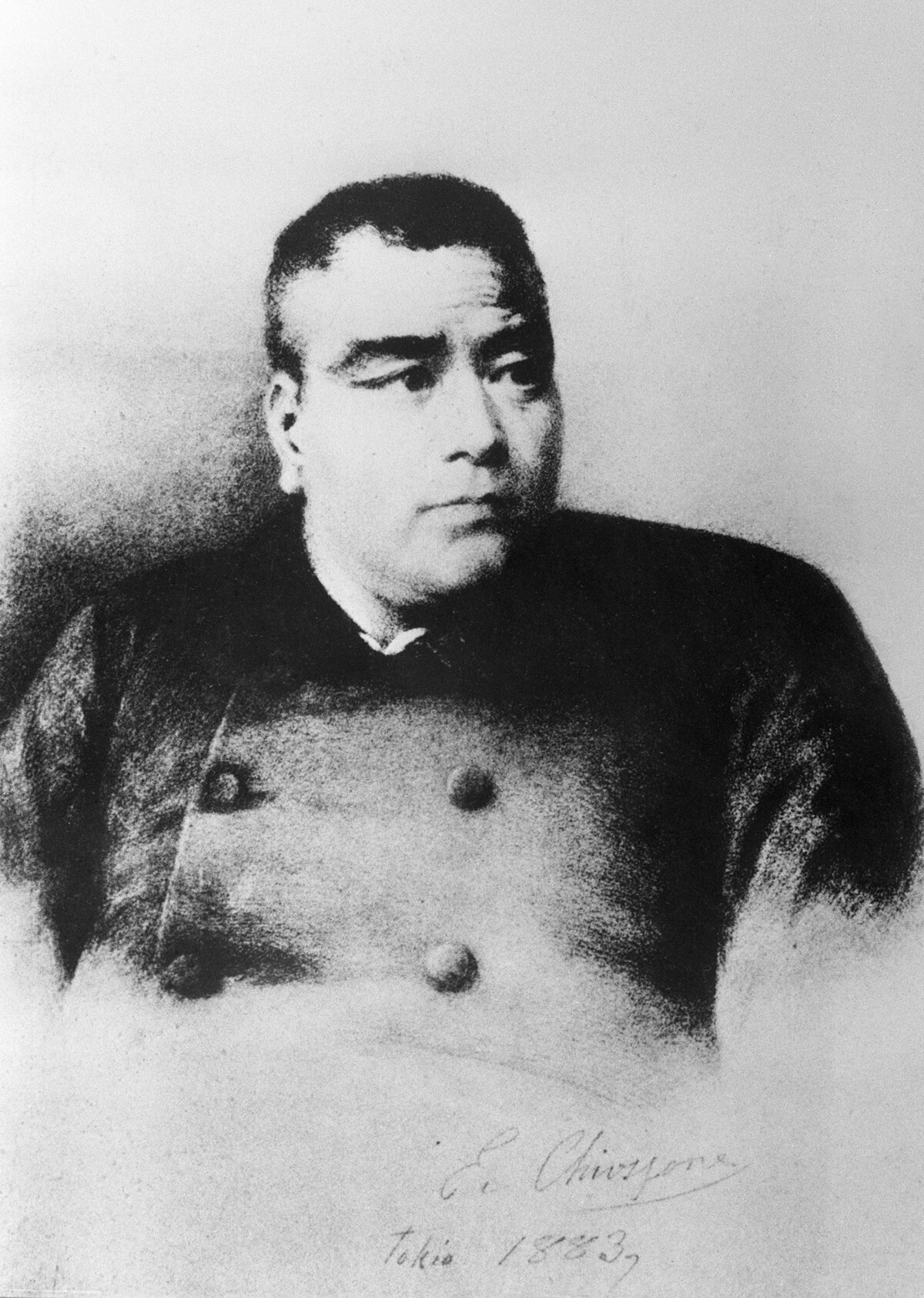
Saigō Takamori

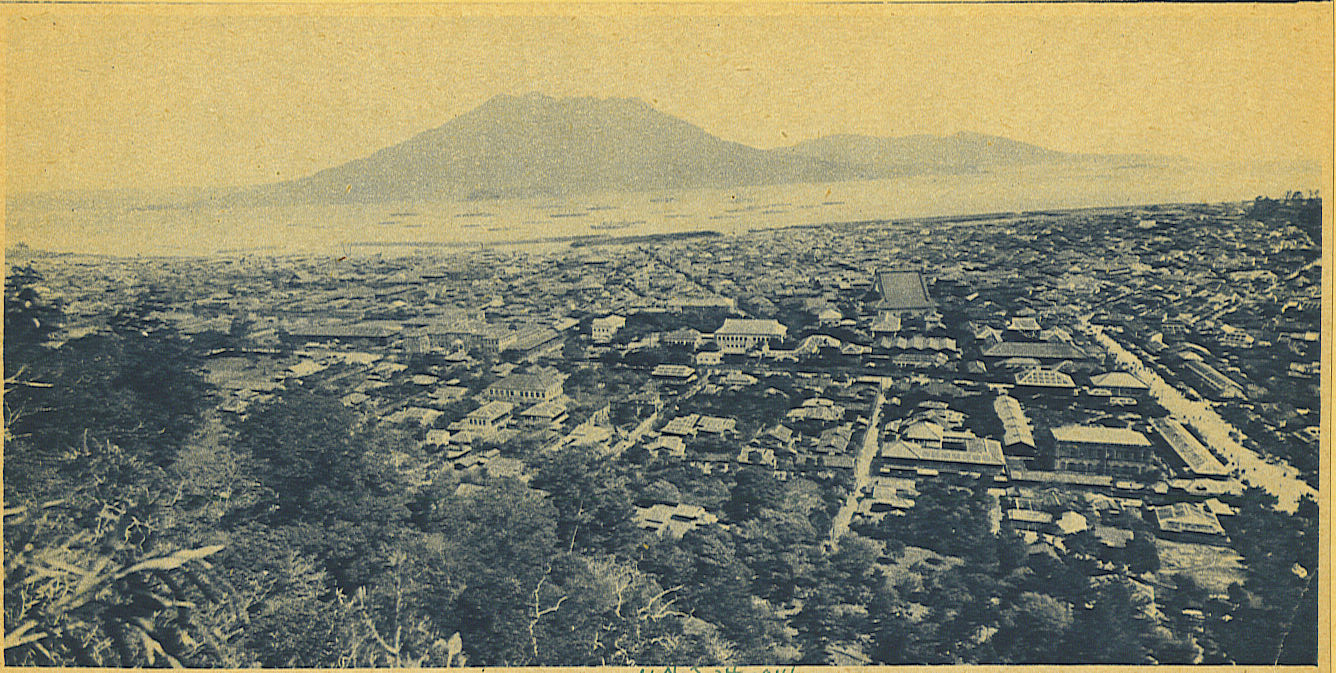
The city of Kagoshima was covered by deep ash during the 1914 eruption of the Sakurajima volcano, in the distance across the bay.

== World War II and after ==
On June 17, 1945, Kagoshima city was attacked by B-29 bombers with 2316 persons killed, while in the same year, suicide attack planes departed from Kagoshima Prefecture. At the end of the war, the islands south of 30th parallel north, or the Tokara and Amami Islands, were separated from Japanese administration and went into American military occupation. The Tokara Islands were return to Kagoshima Prefecture in 1952, which was followed by the Amami Islands in 1953. In 1972, Kamoike Airport was abolished and a new airport was established in Kirishima City. In 1993, 1993 Kagoshima Heavy Rain occurred, with the death toll of 71, but about 2,500 people who were either in 1200 cars or buses, including those on the trains and inhabitants were saved by fishing boats and ferries which carried them to Kagoshima through the Sakurajima Bay. In 1996, the Kagoshima Prefectural buildings were completed in the present place. In 2004, Kyushu Shinkansen partially opened between Shin-Yatsushiro and Kagoshima-Chūō Station which opened fully in 2011.
