= 1953 flood =

1953 flood may refer to:

- North Sea flood of 1953, affecting England, Netherlands and other countries
- 1953 Northern Kyushu flood, Japan
