= Shirakawa (surname) =

Shirakawa (written 白川 or 白河; "white river") is a Japanese surname. Notable people with the surname include:

- Emperor Shirakawa (白河天皇; 1053–1129), 72nd Emperor of Japan
- Emperor Go-Shirakawa (後白河天皇; 1127–1192), 77th Emperor of Japan
- Hideki Shirakawa (白川 英樹; 1936–2026), winner of the 2000 Nobel Prize in Chemistry
- Kazuko Shirakawa (白川 和子; born 1947), Japanese actress
- Masaaki Shirakawa (白川 方明; born 1949), 30th governor of the Bank of Japan
- Mina Shirakawa (白川未奈; born 1987), Japanese professional wrestler for World Wonder Ring Stardom
- Sumiko Shirakawa (白川 澄子; 1935–2015), Japanese voice actress
- Yoshikazu Shirakawa (白川 義員; 1935–2022), Japanese photographer
- Yoshinori Shirakawa (白川 義則; 1869–1932), Japanese samurai and general in the Imperial Japanese Army
- Yukina Shirakawa (白川 ゆきな; born 1985), Japanese gravure idol

== Fictional characters ==
- Naoya Shirakawa (白川 直也), a character in the manga series Kaichou wa Maid-sama!
- Rou Shirakawa (白川 朗), the main protagonist in the manga series Supinamarada and its reboot, Dogsred
