= Aso Tateno Dam =

Dam in Kumamoto Prefecture, Japan

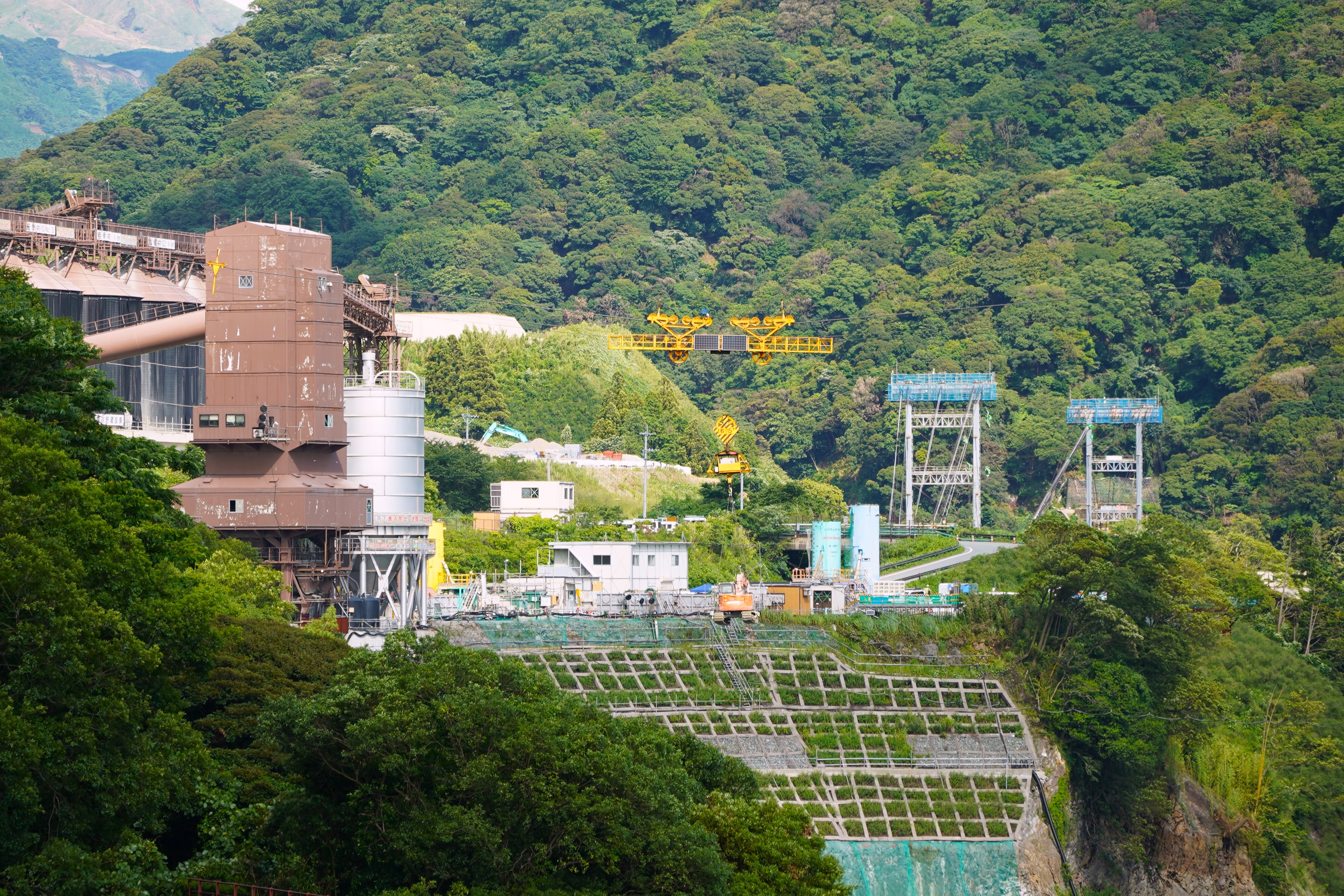
- The dam during construction in 2022

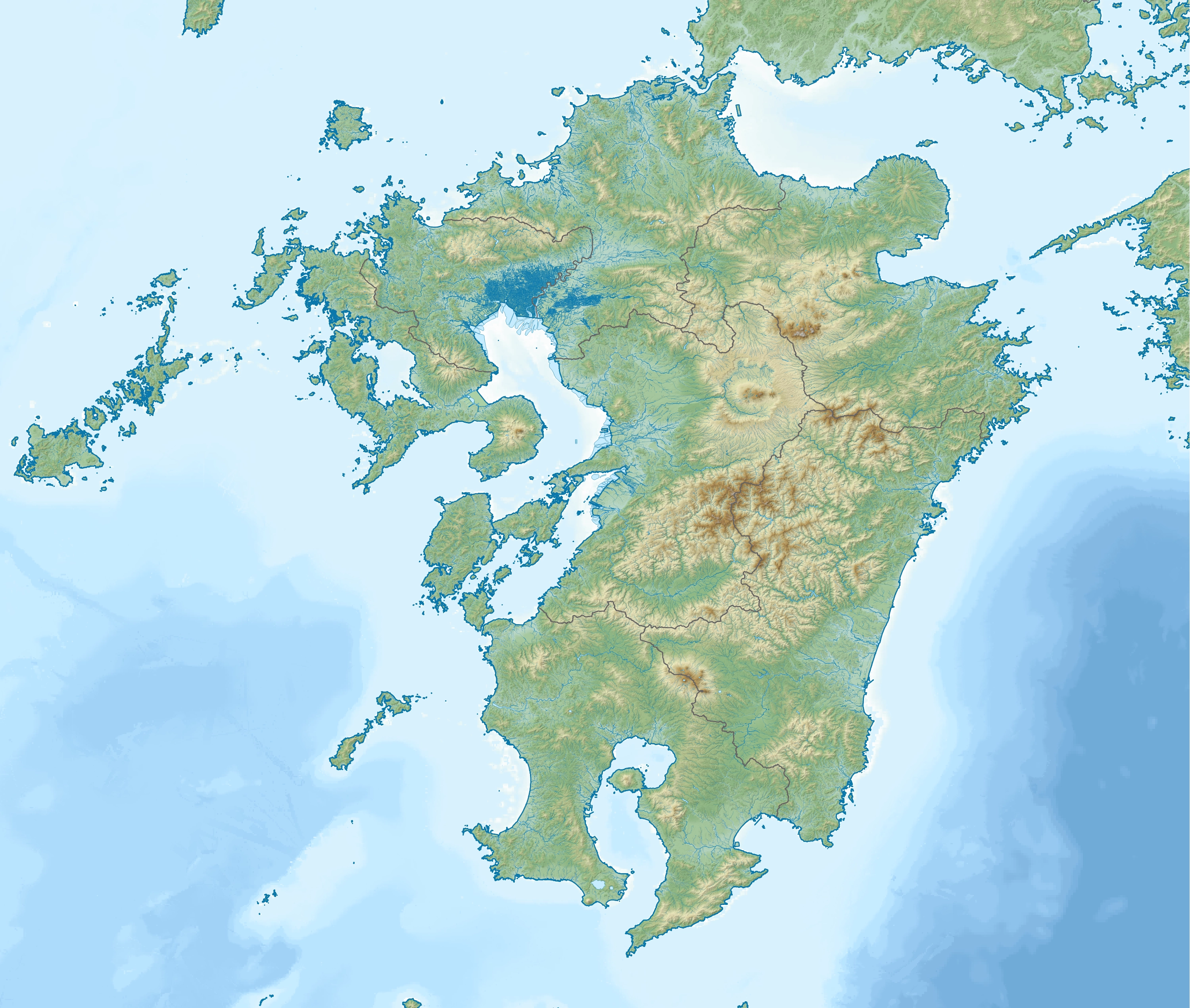
- Location within Kumamoto Prefecture Location within Kyushu Location within Japan
- Interactive map of Aso Tateno Dam
- Official name: Aso Tateno Damu (阿蘇立野ダム)
- Location: Minamiaso, Kumamoto Prefecture, Japan
- Coordinates: 32°52′30″N 130°58′25″E
- Construction began: 1983
- Opening date: April 2024
- Construction cost: ¥127 billion (US$1.16 billion)
- Built by: Kyushu Regional Development Bureau

Dam and spillways
- Height: 83 m (272 ft)
- Length: 197 m (646 ft)

Reservoir
- Total capacity: 10.1×10^{6} m^{3} (357,000,000 ft^{3})
- Catchment area: 383 km^{2} (148 sq mi)
- Surface area: 36 ha (89 acres)

Aso Tateno Dam (Japanese: 阿蘇立野ダム, Hepburn: Aso Tateno Damu), formerly Tateno Dam (立野ダム, Tateno Damu), is a dry dam located in Minamiaso, Kumamoto Prefecture, in Japan. The dam is used for flood control. The dam started construction in 1983, but was only completed and opened in April 2024.

== Overview ==
Aso Tateno Dam is a dry dam located in Minamiaso, Kumamoto. It is about 20 kilometres (12 mi) upstream from Kumamoto City. It is built on the Shirakawa River and is used as a flood control measure for the river, which is well known for causing severe floods in the past, such as the 1953 Northern Kyushu flood. The dam is about 83 metres (272 ft) high and about 197 metres (646 ft) long. The dam also features a 40 metres (130 ft) elevator that goes down inside the dam. The dam has three spillways about 5 square metres (54 sq ft) in area. It has a total storage capacity of 10.1 million cubic metres (357,000,000 ft^{3}).

The dam's construction began in 1983 by the Kyushu Regional Development Bureau, and was named "Tateno Dam". During construction, it was damaged by the 2016 Kumamoto earthquakes. After 41 years, the dam was completed in 2024. It was unveiled on February 17, 2024, and was also renamed to Aso Tateno Dam, and began operation in April 2024. The total construction cost was approximately ¥127 billion (US$1.16 billion).

== Observation deck ==
Minamiaso, Kumamoto built an observation deck in the former construction site of the dam. The observation deck cost ¥314 million (US$2.86 million) and was completed in 2025. It is a 390 square metres (4,200 sq ft) single-story wooden building from which visitors can view the dam's embankment and the surrounding Kumamoto Plain. The observation deck was given the name "Tatetto" (タテット, Tatetto) as it is a combination of the word "Tateno" and "Tetto", meaning "roof" in Italian. The observation desk is set to open to the public in April 2026.

== See also ==
- List of dams in Japan
  - List of dams in Kumamoto Prefecture
- Minamiaso Railway
- Mount Aso – Volcano in Kumamoto Prefecture, Japan
  - Aso Caldera – Caldera in Kumamoto Prefecture, Japan
