= Satoru Noda (artist) =

Japanese manga artist

Satoru Noda 野田サトル
- Born: Kitahiroshima, Hokkaido, Japan
- Area: Manga artist
- Notable works: Golden Kamuy; Supinamarada!; Dogsred
- Awards: Tetsuya Chiba Award (2006); Manga Taishō (2016); Tezuka Osamu Cultural Prize (2018)

Satoru Noda (Japanese: 野田サトル, Hepburn: Noda Satoru) is a Japanese manga artist. He is best known as the creator of the manga series Golden Kamuy, for which he won the 2016 Manga Taishō and the 2018 Tezuka Osamu Cultural Prize.

== Biography ==
Noda was born in Kitahiroshima, Hokkaido, Japan. His great-grandfather was a military settler in Hokkaido and veteran of the Russo-Japanese War; Noda named the protagonist of his manga series Golden Kamuy after him. After moving to Tokyo at the age of 23, he entered the manga industry as an artist assistant. Noda was an assistant to Mitsurou Kubo for two years, and later worked under Yasuyuki Kunitomo. He made his debut as a manga artist in 2003, with the one-shot Kyōko-san no Kyō to iu Kyō (恭子さんの凶という今日; "Kyoko-san's Bad Day") published in Monthly Young Magazine. His second one-shot story, 2006's Gōrī wa Mae Shika Mukanai (ゴーリーは前しか向かない; "The Goalie Always Faces Front"), won a Tetsuya Chiba Award in the Young Artist division.

After working as an artist assistant for nearly a decade, Noda made his serialized manga debut in 2011 with Supinamarada!, serialized in Weekly Young Jump. After Supinamarada! was a commercial failure, Noda took a year before developing his next series, 2014's Golden Kamuy. The series would become a widespread critical and commercial success, and won the Manga Taishō in 2016 and the Tezuka Osamu Cultural Prize in 2018. Following the conclusion of Golden Kamuy in 2022, Noda announced that he would relaunch Supinamarada!. Noda debuted the ice hockey manga reboot under the new name Dogsred in Weekly Young Jump on July 27, 2023.

Little is known about Noda's personal life. Though he maintains an online presence and is interviewed by the press about his work, he does not make public appearances; upon winning the Manga Taishō in 2016, the award was accepted by his editor, with Noda delivering an audio-only acceptance speech.

== Style ==
Noda draws using digital illustration exclusively. While Noda is noted for conducting in-depth research on subject material that appears in his manga, he has stated that he is not interested in maintaining strict historical accuracy in his work, citing historically inaccurate elements in Golden Kamuy such as skiing and certain firearms that were added for dramatic effect.

Noda cites JoJo's Bizarre Adventure creator Hirohiko Araki (Note: In the official Golden Kamuy fanbook, when asked which writer influenced him the most, Noda answered Hirohiko Araki, who is the creator of JoJo's Bizarre Adventure. However in the same interview, he states that he doesn't intend to include JoJo's parodies in Golden Kamuy. In chapter 145 of the manga, the main character, Saichi Sugimoto, rapidly releases a fast barrage of punches followed by after-images of himself. The page itself resembles panels from chapter 46 and chapter 69 of Stardust Crusaders, which is the third part of JoJo's Bizarre Adventure; however, Noda notes that this was actually a reference to Fist of the North Star.) and the manga Keiji, Kinnikuman, and Bloody Stumps Samurai as among his influences. Hallmarks of his work include visual references to pop culture, and narratives that juxtapose gag comedy against violent or dramatic moments. Handsome and muscular men are a recurring element of Noda's work; he has voiced his distaste for bishōnen-styled manga, and has stated that he "draw[s] without compromise the beautiful bodies of men."

== Works ==
=== Serials ===
- Supinamarada!, serialized in Weekly Young Jump (2011–2012)
- Golden Kamuy, serialized in Weekly Young Jump (2014–2022)
- Dogsred, serialized in Weekly Young Jump (2023–present)

=== One-shots ===
- Kyōko-san no Kyō to iu Kyō (恭子さんの凶という今日; "Kyoko-san's Bad Day"), published in Monthly Young Magazine (2003)
- Gōrī wa Mae Shika Mukanai (ゴーリーは前しか向かない; "The Goalie Always Faces Front"), published in Monthly Young Magazine (2006)
- Love of the Giant God Warrior - Spinamarada! Gaiden-(Aoharu No.0.99)
- World Wide Wild ("Weekly Young Jump, etc." Vol.23, 2013)

== Awards ==
Year	Nominated work	Category	Award	Result	Notes	Ref.
2006	Gōrī wa Mae Shika Mukanai	Young Artist Division	Tetsuya Chiba Award	Won		
2016	Golden Kamuy	Male Readers	Kono Manga ga Sugoi!	Second place		
2016	Golden Kamuy	Grand Prize	Tezuka Osamu Cultural Prize	Nominated		
2016	Golden Kamuy	—	Manga Taishō	Won		
2017	Golden Kamuy	Grand Prize	Tezuka Osamu Cultural Prize	Nominated		
2018	Golden Kamuy	Grand Prize	Tezuka Osamu Cultural Prize	Won		
2018	Golden Kamuy	Best U.S. Edition of International Material—Asia	Eisner Award	Nominated	English-language translation by Viz Media	
