= Himenokawauchi Dam =

Dam in Kumamoto Prefecture, Japan

- Location within Japan
- Interactive map of Himenokawauchi Dam
- Official name: 姫の河内ダム
- Location: Kumamoto Prefecture, Japan
- Coordinates: 32°15′16″N 130°1′44″E
- Construction began: 1985
- Opening date: 1987

Dam and spillways
- Height: 21 m (69 ft)
- Length: 81 m (266 ft)

Reservoir
- Total capacity: 109 thousand cubic meters
- Catchment area: 1.2 sq. km
- Surface area: 3 hectares

Himenokawauchi Dam (Japanese: 姫の河内ダム) is a gravity dam located in Kumamoto Prefecture in Japan. The dam is used for water supply. The catchment area of the dam is 1.2 km^{2}. The dam impounds about 3 ha of land when full and can store 109 thousand cubic meters of water. The construction of the dam was started on 1985 and completed in 1987.

== See also ==
- List of dams in Japan
