= Fukasako Dam =

Dam in Kumamoto Prefecture, Japan

- Location within Japan
- Interactive map of Fukasako Dam
- Official name: 深迫ダム
- Location: Kumamoto Prefecture, Japan
- Coordinates: 32°49′41″N 130°50′37″E
- Construction began: 1969
- Opening date: 1984

Dam and spillways
- Height: 19 m (62 ft)
- Length: 241 m (791 ft)

Reservoir
- Total capacity: 1268 thousand cubic meters
- Catchment area: 2.7 sq. km
- Surface area: 14 hectares

Fukasako Dam (Japanese: 深迫ダム) is an earthfill dam located in Kumamoto Prefecture in Japan. The dam is used for irrigation. The catchment area of the dam is 2.7 km^{2}. The dam impounds about 14 ha of land when full and can store 1268 thousand cubic meters of water. The construction of the dam was started on 1969 and completed in 1984.

== See also ==
- List of dams in Japan
