= Shirakawa River (Kumamoto) =

River of Kumamoto prefecture, Japan

Coordinates: 32°46′51″N 130°36′13″E

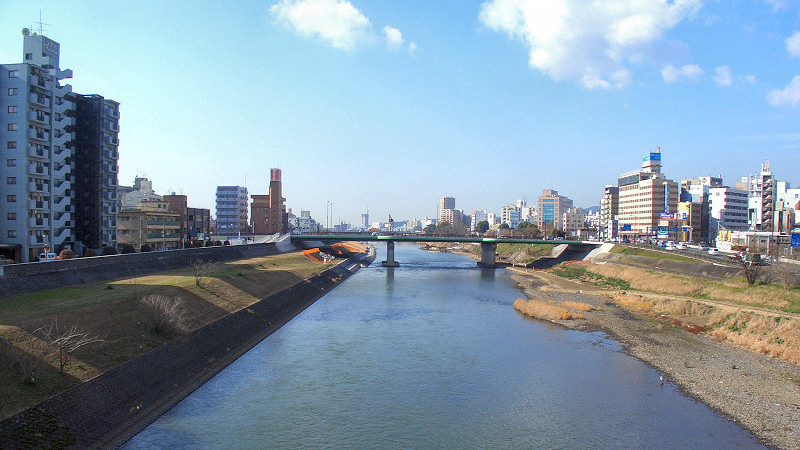

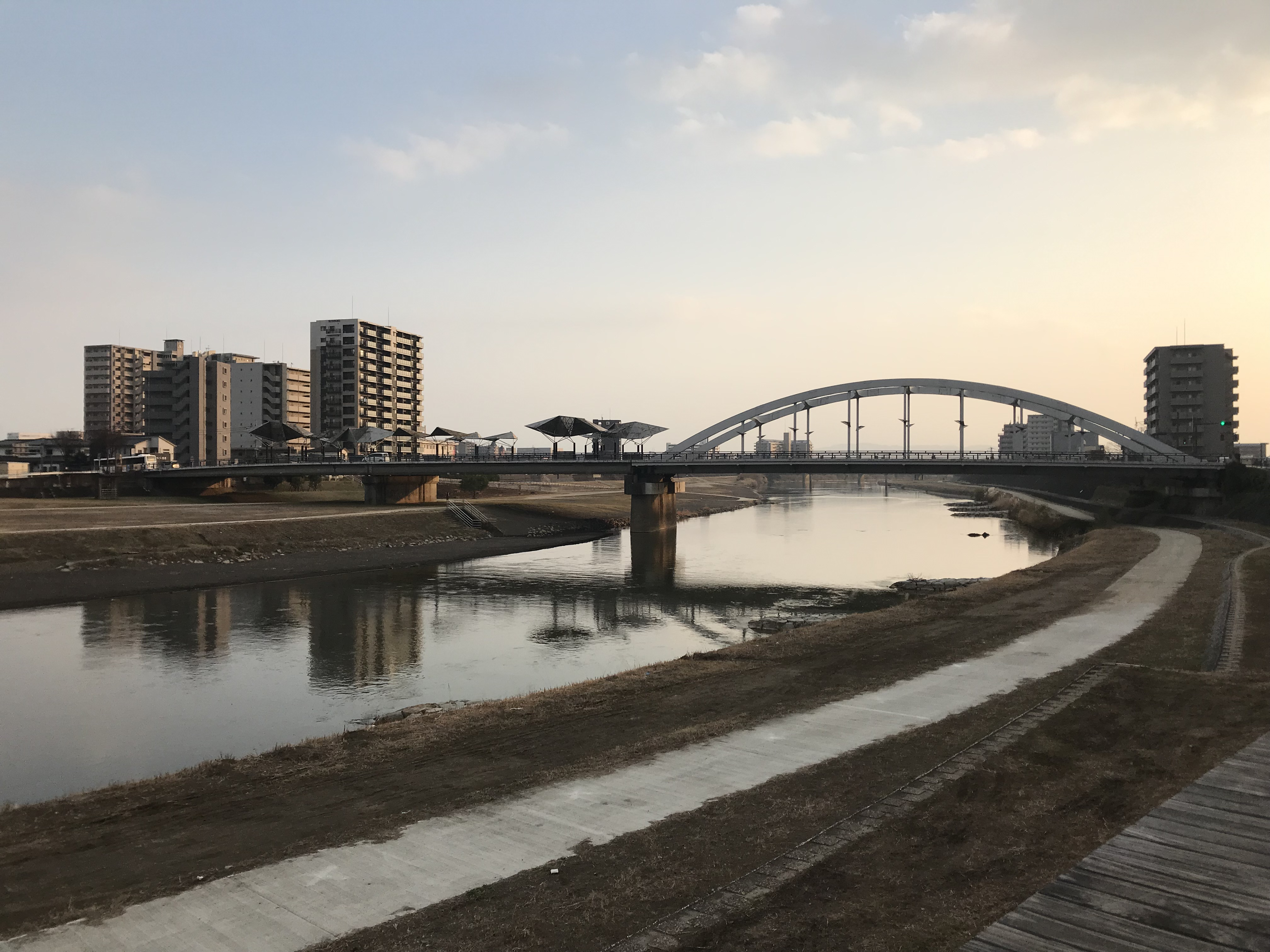
Shirakawabashi Bridge running over the Shirakawa River as it passes through Kumamoto.

The Shirakawa river (Japanese: 白川) is a first-class river that runs down from Mount Aso through Kumamoto. In the past the Shirakawa River has overflowed and led to severe flooding such as during the 1953 North Kyushu flood.

== See also ==
- Aso Tateno Dam
