= Shimouke Dam =

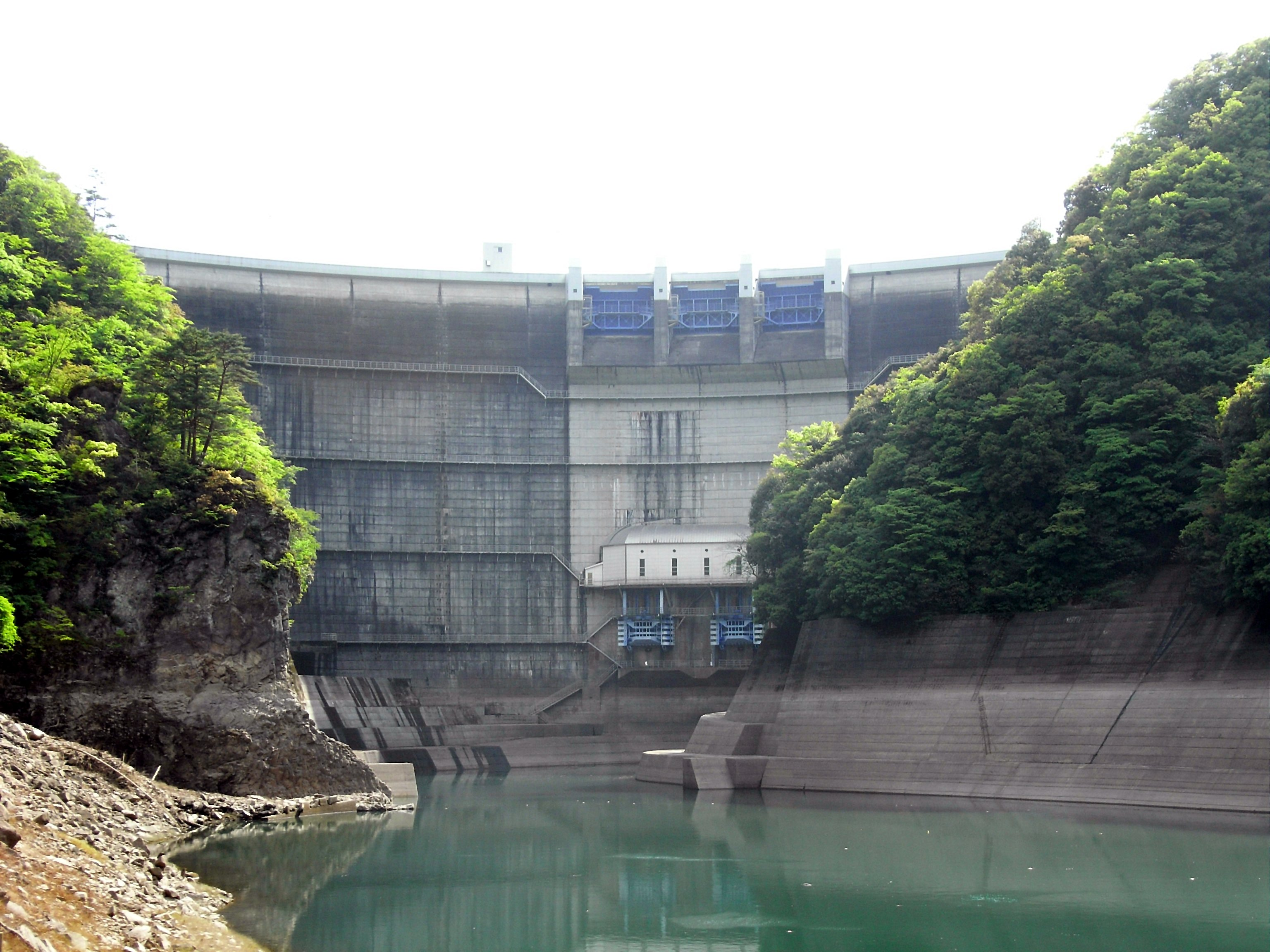
- Interactive map of Shimouke Dam
- Location: Ōita Prefecture, Japan
- Coordinates: 33°9′35″N 130°59′3″E

Shimouke Dam (Japanese: 下筌ダム) is a dam in the Ōita Prefecture, Japan, completed in 1972.
