= Ohso Dam =

Dam in Kumamoto Prefecture, Japan

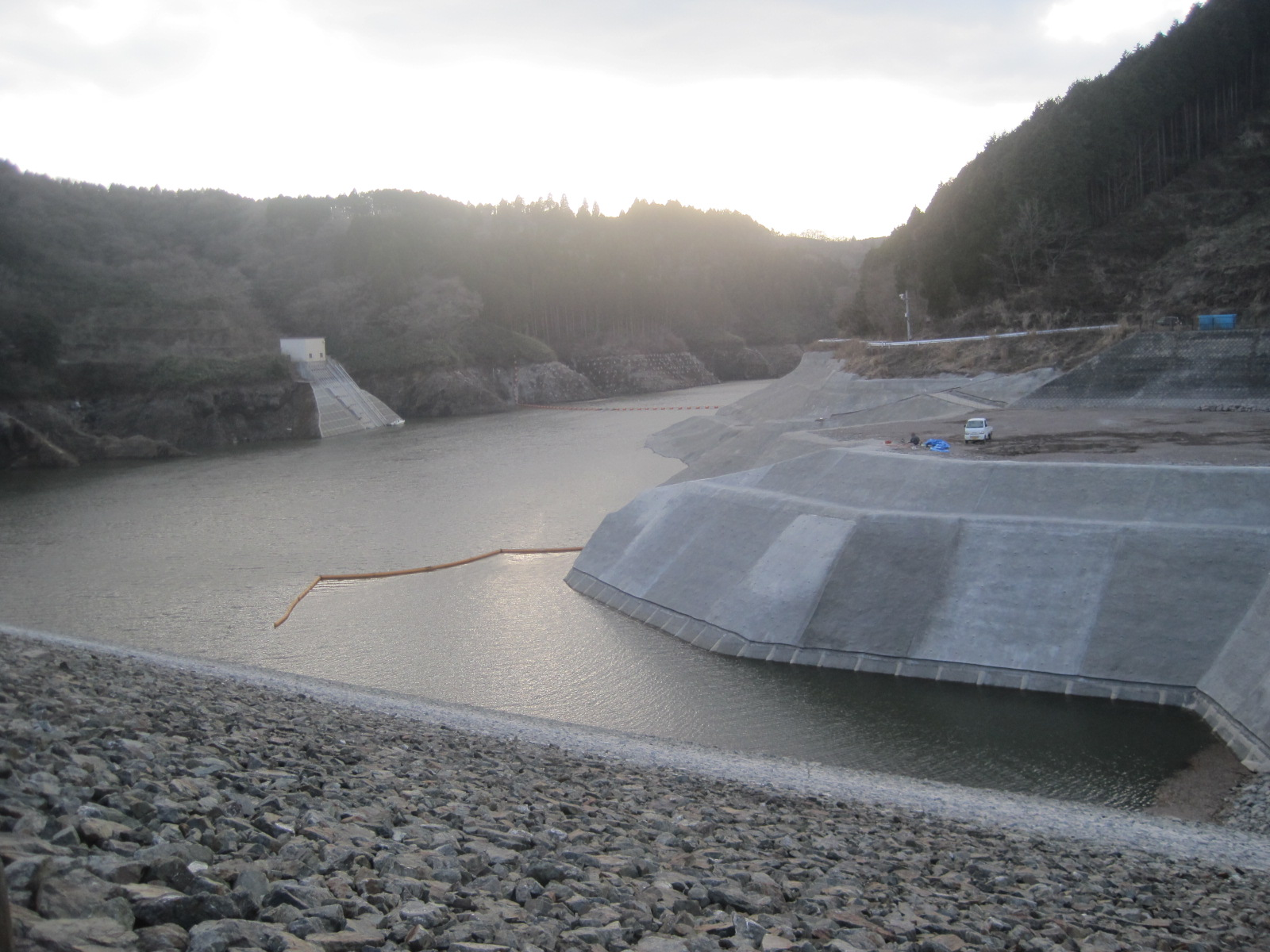

- Location within Japan
- Official name: 大蘇ダム
- Location: Kumamoto Prefecture, Japan
- Coordinates: 32°59′42″N 131°12′04″E
- Construction began: 1975
- Opening date: 2019

Dam and spillways
- Height: 69.9 m (229 ft)
- Length: 262.1 m (860 ft)

Reservoir
- Total capacity: 4,300,000 m^{3} (150,000,000 cu ft)
- Catchment area: 26 km^{2} (10 sq mi)
- Surface area: 28 hectares (69 acres)

Ohso Dam (Japanese: 大蘇ダム) is a rockfill dam located in Kumamoto Prefecture in Japan. The dam is used for irrigation. The catchment area of the dam is 26 km^{2}. The dam impounds about 28 ha of land when full and can store 4300 thousand cubic meters of water. The construction of the dam was started on 1975 and completed in 2019.

== See also ==
- List of dams in Japan
