= Funatsu Dam =

Dam in Kumamoto Prefecture, Japan

- Location within Japan
- Interactive map of Funatsu Dam
- Official name: 船津ダム
- Location: Kumamoto Prefecture, Japan
- Coordinates: 32°37′53″N 130°53′35″E
- Construction began: 1967
- Opening date: 1970

Dam and spillways
- Height: 25.5 m (84 ft)
- Length: 175 m (574 ft)

Reservoir
- Total capacity: 2495 thousand cubic meters
- Catchment area: 377.8 sq. km
- Surface area: 30 hectares

Funatsu Dam (Japanese: 船津ダム) is a gravity dam located in Kumamoto Prefecture in Japan. The dam is used for power production. The catchment area of the dam is 377.8 km^{2}. The dam impounds about 30 ha of land when full and can store 2495 thousand cubic meters of water. The construction of the dam was started on 1967 and completed in 1970.

== See also ==
- List of dams in Japan
