= Itsuwa Dam =

Dam in Kumamoto Prefecture, Japan

- Location within Japan
- Interactive map of Itsuwa Dam
- Official name: 五和ダム
- Location: Kumamoto Prefecture, Japan
- Coordinates: 32°29′00″N 130°7′29″E
- Construction began: 1981
- Opening date: 1985

Dam and spillways
- Height: 37.1 m (122 ft)
- Length: 173.3 m (569 ft)

Reservoir
- Total capacity: 570 thousand cubic meters
- Catchment area: 2.7 sq. km
- Surface area: 5 hectares

Itsuwa Dam (Japanese: 五和ダム) is a rockfill dam located in Kumamoto Prefecture in Japan. The dam is used for irrigation. The catchment area of the dam is 2.7 km^{2}. The dam impounds about 5 ha of land when full and can store 570 thousand cubic meters of water. The construction of the dam was started on 1981 and completed in 1985.

== See also ==
- List of dams in Japan
