= Ohtani Dam (Kumamoto) =

Dam in Kumamoto Prefecture, Japan

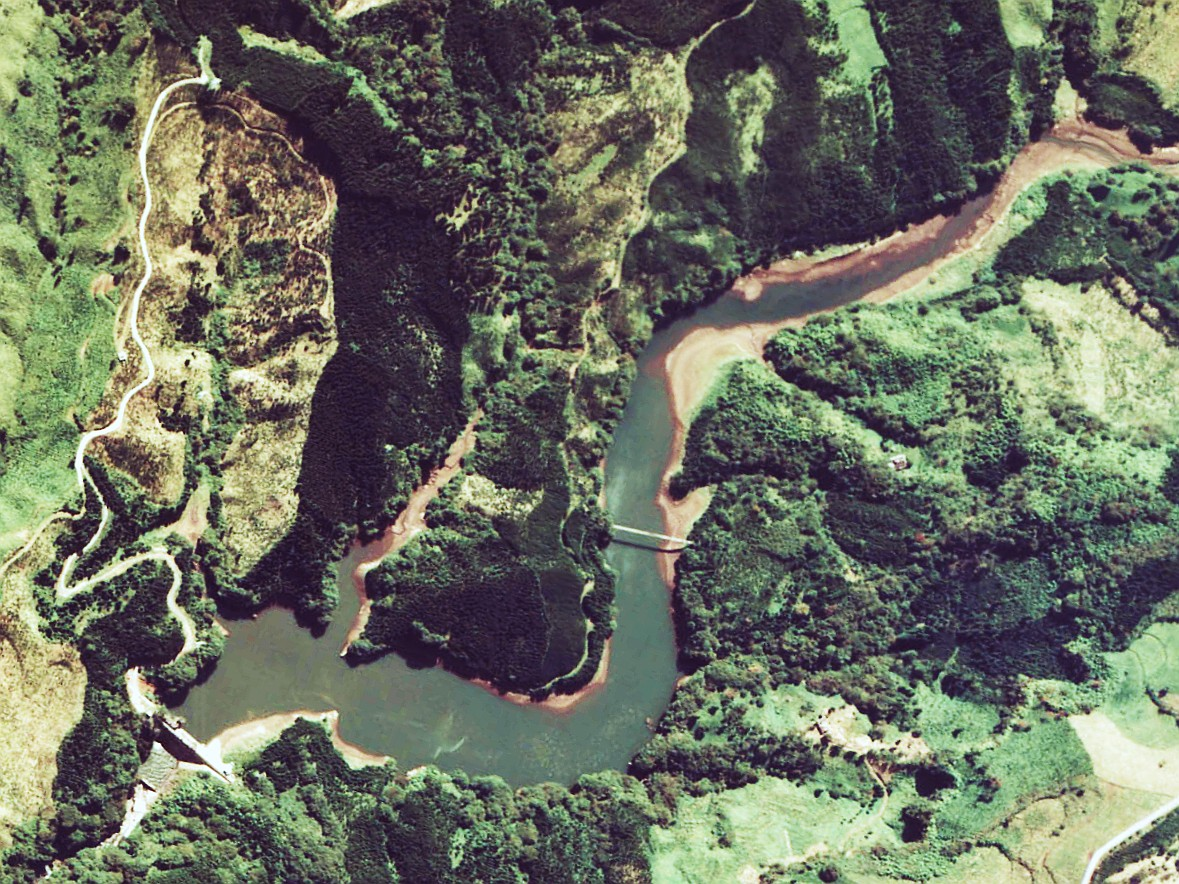
- Ōtani Dam

- Location within Japan
- Official name: 大谷ダム
- Location: Kumamoto Prefecture, Japan
- Coordinates: 32°51′20″N 131°15′42″E
- Opening date: 1940

Dam and spillways
- Height: 26.1 m (86 ft)
- Length: 98.6 m (323 ft)

Reservoir
- Total capacity: 2,021,000 m^{3} (71,400,000 cu ft)
- Catchment area: 53.4 km^{2} (20.6 sq mi)
- Surface area: 18 ha (44 acres)

Ohtani Dam (Japanese: 大谷ダム) is a gravity dam located in Kumamoto Prefecture in Japan. The dam is used for irrigation. The catchment area of the dam is 53.4 km^{2} (20.6 sq mi). The dam impounds about 18 ha of land when full and can store 2021 thousand cubic meters of water. The construction of the dam was completed in 1940.

== See also ==
- List of dams in Japan
