= Kono Dam =

Dam in Kumamoto Prefecture, Japan

KonoDam
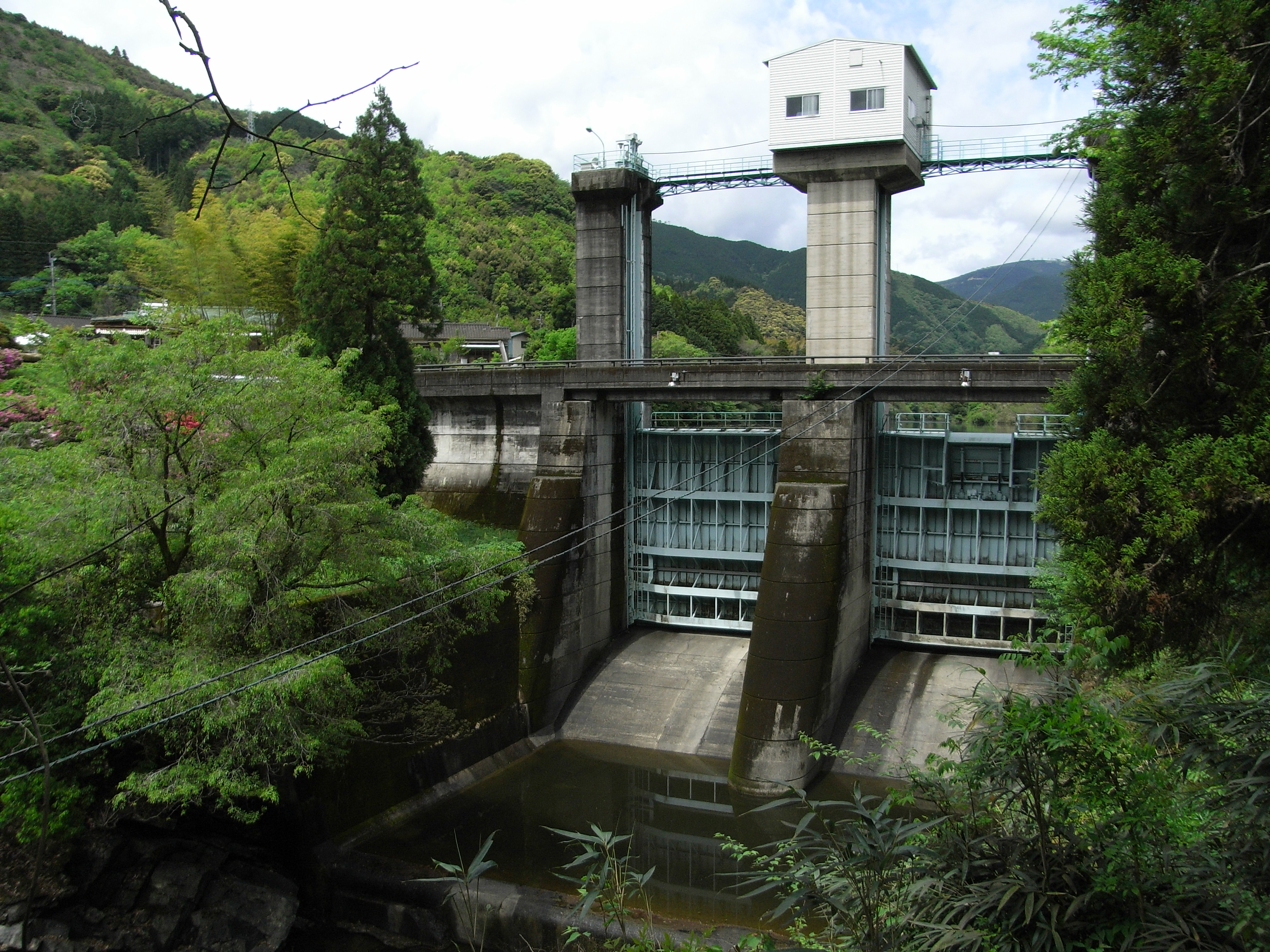

- Location within Japan
- Official name: 幸野ダム
- Location: Kumamoto Prefecture, Japan
- Coordinates: 32°18′23″N 131°0′10″E
- Construction began: 1958
- Opening date: 1959

Dam and spillways
- Height: 21.2 m (70 ft)
- Length: 90.5 m (297 ft)

Reservoir
- Total capacity: 326 thousand cubic meters
- Catchment area: 161.1 sq. km
- Surface area: 6 hectares

KonoDam (Japanese: 幸野ダム) is a gravity dam located in Kumamoto Prefecture in Japan. The dam is used for irrigation and power production. The catchment area of the dam is 161.1 km^{2}. The dam impounds about 6 ha of land when full and can store 326 thousand cubic meters of water. The construction of the dam was started on 1958 and completed in 1959.

== See also ==
- List of dams in Japan
