= Hikawa Dam =

Dam in Kumamoto Prefecture, Japan

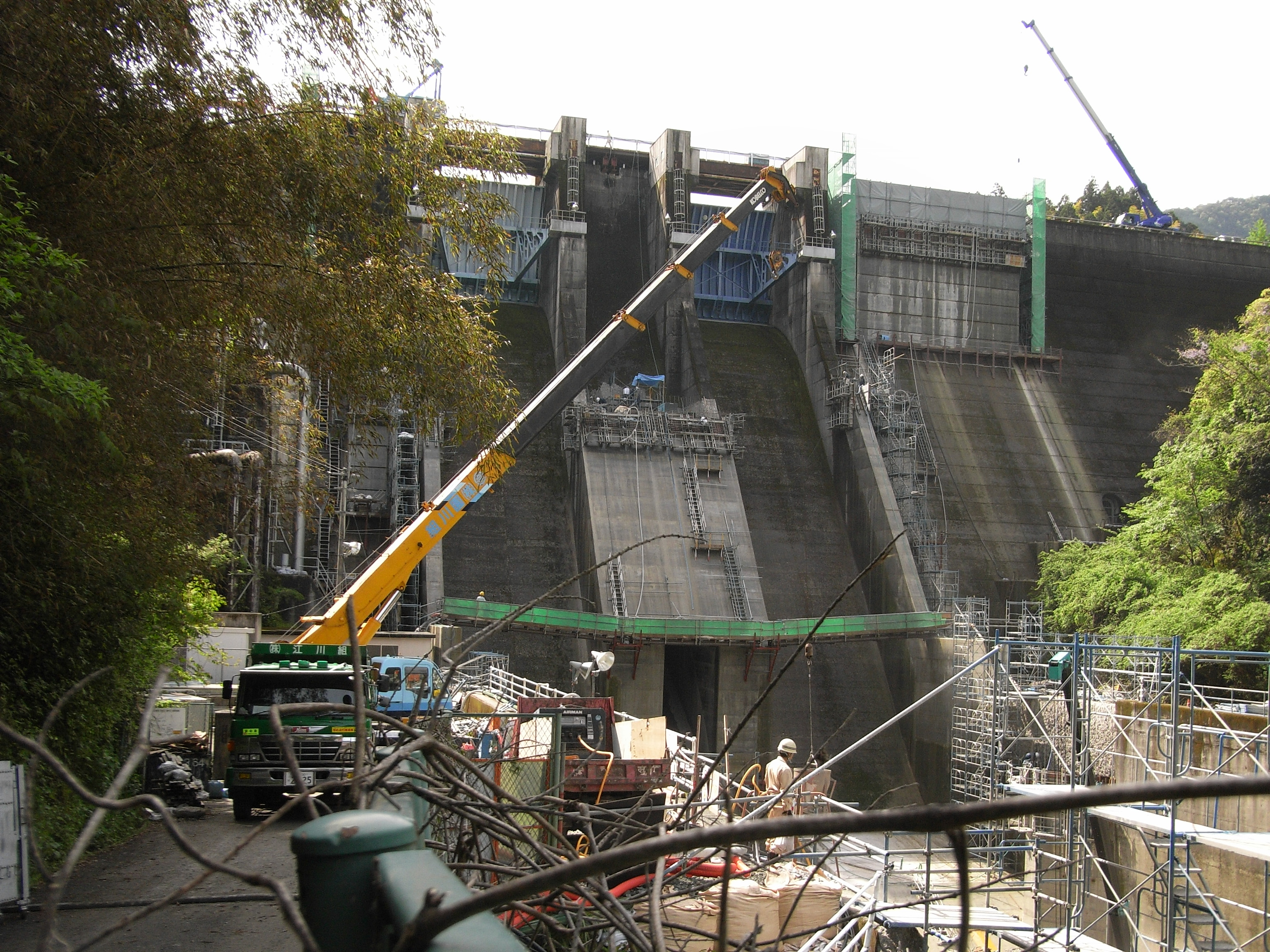

- Location within Japan
- Interactive map of Hikawa Dam
- Official name: 氷川ダム（再）
- Location: Kumamoto Prefecture, Japan
- Coordinates: 32°34′16″N 130°47′12″E
- Construction began: 1990
- Opening date: 2010

Dam and spillways
- Height: 58.5 m (192 ft)
- Length: 202 m (663 ft)

Reservoir
- Total capacity: 7100 thousand cubic meters
- Catchment area: 57.4 sq. km
- Surface area: 35 hectares

Hikawa Dam (Japanese: 氷川ダム（再）) is a gravity dam located in Kumamoto Prefecture in Japan. The dam is used for flood control, irrigation and water supply. The catchment area of the dam is 57.4 km^{2}. The dam impounds about 35 ha of land when full and can store 7100 thousand cubic meters of water. The construction of the dam was started on 1990 and completed in 2010.

== See also ==
- List of dams in Japan
