= Kusuura Dam =

Dam in Kumamoto Prefecture, Japan

- Location within Japan
- Official name: 楠浦ダム
- Location: Kumamoto Prefecture, Japan
- Coordinates: 32°24′12″N 130°10′22″E
- Construction began: 1963
- Opening date: 1966

Dam and spillways
- Height: 32 m (105 ft)
- Length: 139.1 m (456 ft)

Reservoir
- Total capacity: 1068 thousand cubic meters
- Catchment area: 7.8 sq. km
- Surface area: 10 hectares

Kusuura Dam (Japanese: 楠浦ダム) is an earthfill dam located in Kumamoto Prefecture in Japan. The dam is used for irrigation and water supply. The catchment area of the dam is 7.8 km^{2}. The dam impounds about 10 ha of land when full and can store 1068 thousand cubic meters of water. The construction of the dam was started on 1963 and completed in 1966.

== See also ==
- List of dams in Japan
