= Ohkubo Tameike Dam =

Dam in Kumamoto Prefecture, Japan

- Location within Japan
- Official name: 大久保溜池
- Location: Kumamoto Prefecture, Japan
- Coordinates: 32°13′03″N 130°40′08″E
- Construction began: 1912
- Opening date: 1914

Dam and spillways
- Height: 15 m (49 ft)
- Length: 86 m (282 ft)

Reservoir
- Total capacity: 105,000 m^{3} (3,700,000 cu ft)
- Catchment area: 0.3 km^{2} (0.12 sq mi)
- Surface area: 2 hectares (4.9 acres)

Ohkubo Tameike Dam (Japanese: 大久保溜池) is an earthfill dam located in Kumamoto Prefecture in Japan. The dam is used for irrigation. The catchment area of the dam is 0.3 km^{2}. The dam impounds about 2 ha of land when full and can store 105 thousand cubic meters of water. The construction of the dam was started on 1912 and completed in 1914.

== See also ==
- List of dams in Japan
