= Ichifusa Dam =

Dam in Kumamoto Prefecture, Japan

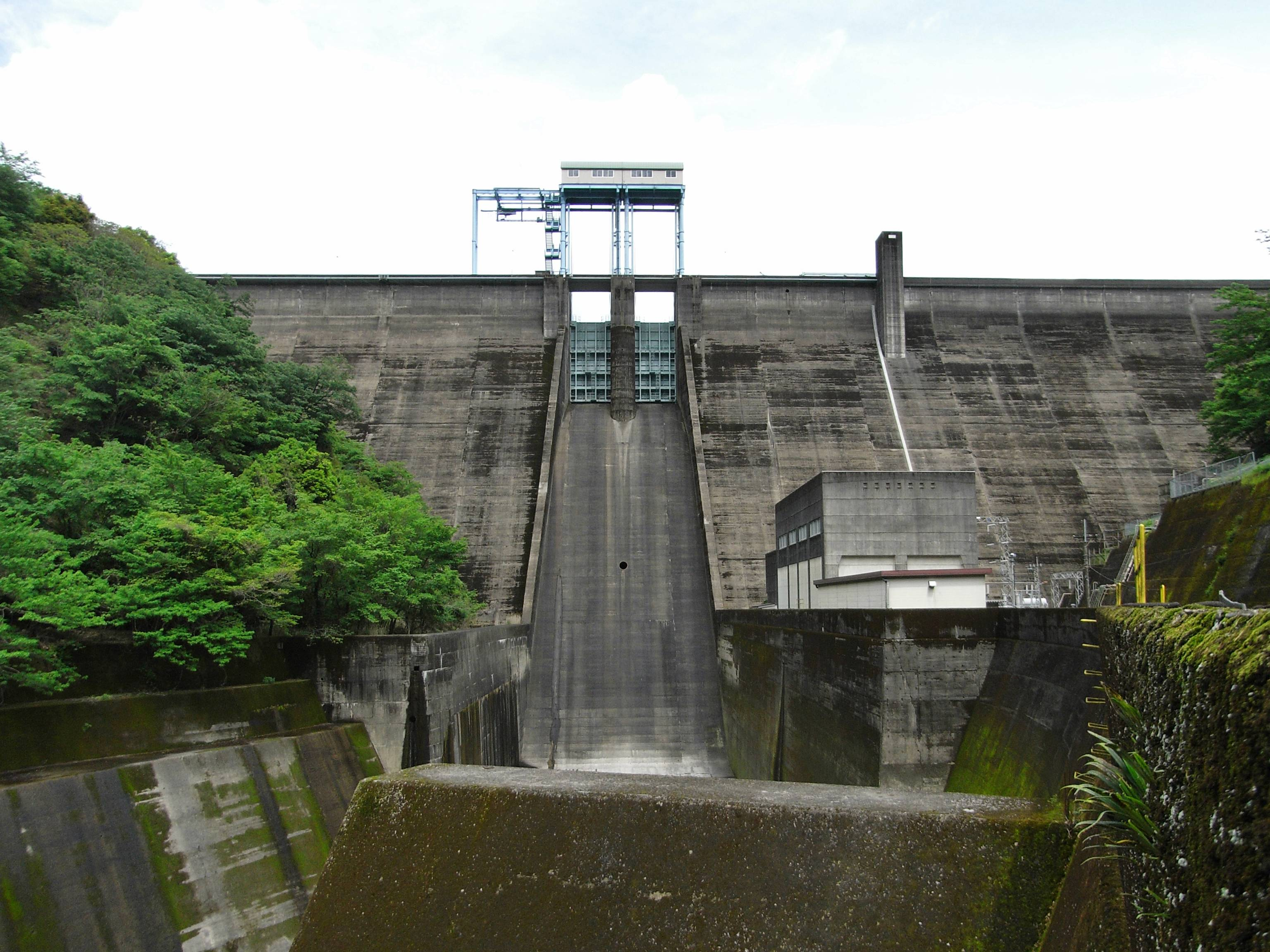

- Location within Japan
- Interactive map of Ichifusa Dam
- Official name: 市房ダム
- Location: Kumamoto Prefecture, Japan
- Coordinates: 32°19′12″N 131°0′46″E
- Construction began: 1953
- Opening date: 1959

Dam and spillways
- Height: 78.5 m (258 ft)
- Length: 258.5 m (848 ft)

Reservoir
- Total capacity: 40200 thousand cubic meters
- Catchment area: 157.8 sq. km
- Surface area: 165 hectares

Ichifusa Dam (Japanese: 市房ダム) is a gravity dam located in Kumamoto Prefecture in Japan. The dam is used for flood control and power production. The catchment area of the dam is 157.8 km^{2}. The dam impounds about 165 ha of land when full and can store 40200 thousand cubic meters of water. The construction of the dam was started on 1953 and completed in 1959.

== See also ==
- List of dams in Japan
