= Kyoragi Dam =

Dam in Kumamoto Prefecture, Japan

- Location within Japan
- Official name: 教良木ダム
- Location: Kumamoto Prefecture, Japan
- Coordinates: 32°27′33″N 130°22′12″E
- Construction began: 1972
- Opening date: 1976

Dam and spillways
- Height: 29.3 m (96 ft)
- Length: 108 m (354 ft)

Reservoir
- Total capacity: 1391 thousand cubic meters
- Catchment area: 3.1 sq. km
- Surface area: 18 hectares

Kyoragi Dam (Japanese: 教良木ダム) is a rockfill dam located in Kumamoto Prefecture in Japan. The dam is used for irrigation and water supply. The catchment area of the dam is 3.1 km^{2}. The dam impounds about 18 ha of land when full and can store 1391 thousand cubic meters of water. The construction of the dam was started on 1972 and completed in 1976.

== See also ==
- List of dams in Japan
