= Rogi Dam =

Dam in Kumamoto Prefecture, Japan

- Location within Japan
- Official name: 路木ダム
- Location: Kumamoto Prefecture, Japan
- Coordinates: 32°16′56″N 130°5′14″E
- Construction began: 1992
- Opening date: 2013

Dam and spillways
- Height: 53 m (174 ft)
- Length: 169 m (554 ft)

Reservoir
- Total capacity: 2,290,000 m^{3} (81,000,000 cu ft)
- Catchment area: 6.8 km^{2} (2.6 sq mi)
- Surface area: 14 hectares (35 acres)

Rogi Dam (Japanese: 路木ダム) is a gravity dam located in Kumamoto Prefecture in Japan. The dam is used for flood control and water supply. The catchment area of the dam is 6.8 km^{2}. The dam impounds about 14 ha of land when full and can store 2290 thousand cubic meters of water. The construction of the dam was started on 1992 and completed in 2013.

== See also ==
- List of dams in Japan
