= Shiki Dam =

Dam in Kumamoto Prefecture, Japan

- Location within Japan
- Official name: 志岐ダム
- Location: Kumamoto Prefecture, Japan
- Coordinates: 32°29′03″N 130°4′10″E
- Construction began: 1968
- Opening date: 1973

Dam and spillways
- Height: 36 m (118 ft)
- Length: 145 m (476 ft)

Reservoir
- Total capacity: 803,000 m^{3} (28,400,000 cu ft)
- Catchment area: 5.9 km^{2} (2.3 sq mi)
- Surface area: 8 hectares (20 acres)

Shiki Dam (Japanese: 志岐ダム) is an earthfill dam located in Kumamoto Prefecture in Japan. The dam is used for irrigation. The catchment area of the dam is 5.9 km^{2}. The dam impounds about 8 ha of land when full and can store 803 thousand cubic meters of water. The construction of the dam was started on 1968 and completed in 1973.

== See also ==
- List of dams in Japan
