= Kotsuura Dam =

Dam in Kumamoto Prefecture, Japan

- Location within Japan
- Official name: 上津浦ダム
- Location: Kumamoto Prefecture, Japan
- Coordinates: 32°28′37″N 130°19′29″E
- Construction began: 1989
- Opening date: 2004

Dam and spillways
- Height: 54 m (177 ft)
- Length: 205 m (673 ft)

Reservoir
- Total capacity: 467 thousand cubic meters
- Catchment area: 1.2 sq. km
- Surface area: 2 hectares

Kotsuura Dam (Japanese: 上津浦ダム) is a gravity dam located in Kumamoto Prefecture in Japan. The dam is used for flood control and water supply. The catchment area of the dam is 1.2 km^{2}. The dam impounds about 2 ha of land when full and can store 467 thousand cubic meters of water. The construction of the dam was started on 1989 and completed in 2004.

== See also ==
- List of dams in Japan
