= Seiganji Dam =

Dam in Kumamoto Prefecture, Japan

- Location within Japan
- Official name: 清願寺ダム
- Location: Kumamoto Prefecture, Japan
- Coordinates: 32°11′54″N 130°56′17″E
- Construction began: 1969
- Opening date: 1978

Dam and spillways
- Height: 60.5 m (198 ft)
- Length: 199 m (653 ft)

Reservoir
- Total capacity: 3,302,000 m^{3} (116,600,000 cu ft)
- Catchment area: 17.5 km^{2} (6.8 sq mi)
- Surface area: 19 hectares (47 acres)

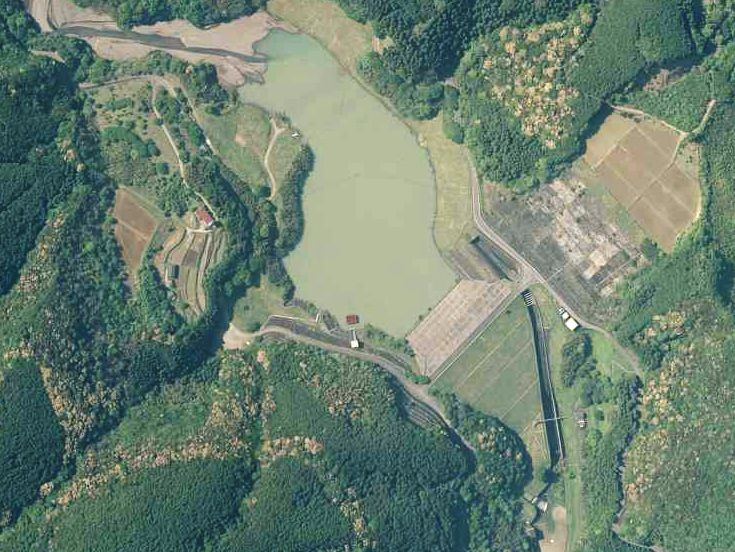
Aerial view of the dam

Seiganji Dam (Japanese: 清願寺ダム) is an earthfill dam located in Kumamoto Prefecture in Japan. The dam is used for flood control and irrigation. The catchment area of the dam is 17.5 km^{2}. The dam impounds about 19 ha of land when full and can store 3302 thousand cubic meters of water. The construction of the dam was started on 1969 and completed in 1978.

== See also ==
- List of dams in Japan
