= Setoishi Dam =

Dam in Kumamoto Prefecture, Japan

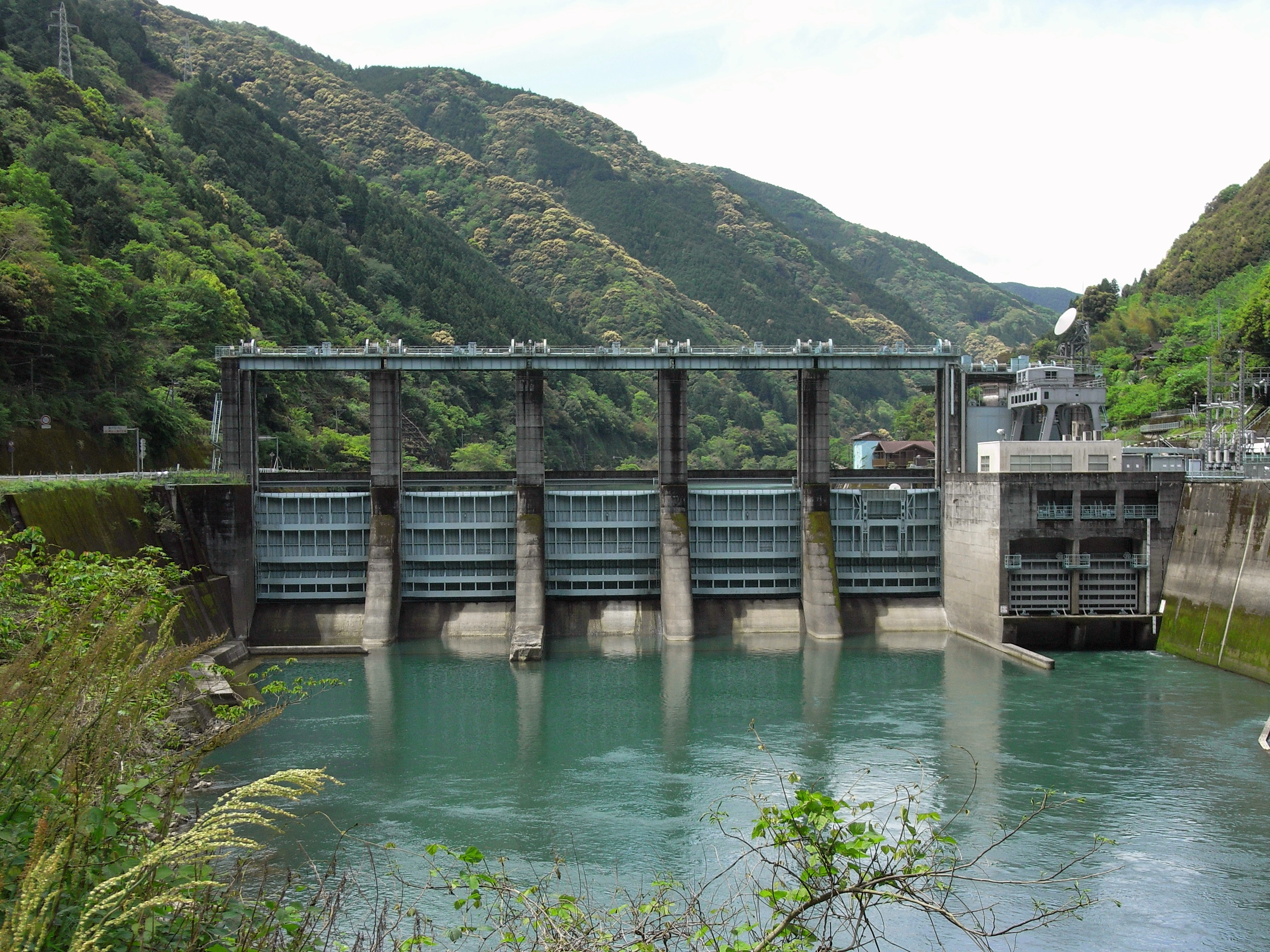

- Location within Japan
- Official name: 瀬戸石ダム
- Location: Kumamoto Prefecture, Japan
- Coordinates: 32°21′31″N 130°38′26″E
- Construction began: 1956
- Opening date: 1958

Dam and spillways
- Height: 26.5 m (87 ft)
- Length: 139.4 m (457 ft)

Reservoir
- Total capacity: 9,930,000 m^{3} (351,000,000 cu ft)
- Catchment area: 1,629.3 km^{2} (629.1 sq mi)
- Surface area: 124 hectares (310 acres)

Setoishi Dam (Japanese: 瀬戸石ダム) is a gravity dam located in Kumamoto Prefecture in Japan. The dam is used for power production. The catchment area of the dam is 1629.3 km^{2}. The dam impounds about 124 ha of land when full and can store 9930 thousand cubic meters of water. The construction of the dam was started on 1956 and completed in 1958.

== See also ==
- List of dams in Japan
