= Kuwanouchi Dam =

Dam in Kumamoto Prefecture, Japan

- Location within Japan
- Official name: 桑野内ダム
- Location: Kumamoto Prefecture, Japan
- Coordinates: 32°43′49″N 131°12′22″E
- Construction began: 1925
- Opening date: 1955

Dam and spillways
- Height: 26.5 m (87 ft)
- Length: 96.4 m (316 ft)

Reservoir
- Total capacity: 961 thousand cubic meters
- Catchment area: 215 sq. km
- Surface area: 13 hectares

Kuwanouchi Dam (Japanese: 桑野内ダム) is a gravity dam located in Kumamoto Prefecture in Japan. The dam is used for power production. The catchment area of the dam is 215 km^{2}. The dam impounds about 13 ha of land when full and can store 961 thousand cubic meters of water. The construction of the dam was started on 1925 and completed in 1955.

== See also ==
- List of dams in Japan
