= 1953 Northern Kyushu flood =

1953 flood in Japan

Coordinates: 33.627504°N 130.422935°E

1953 North Kyushu flood
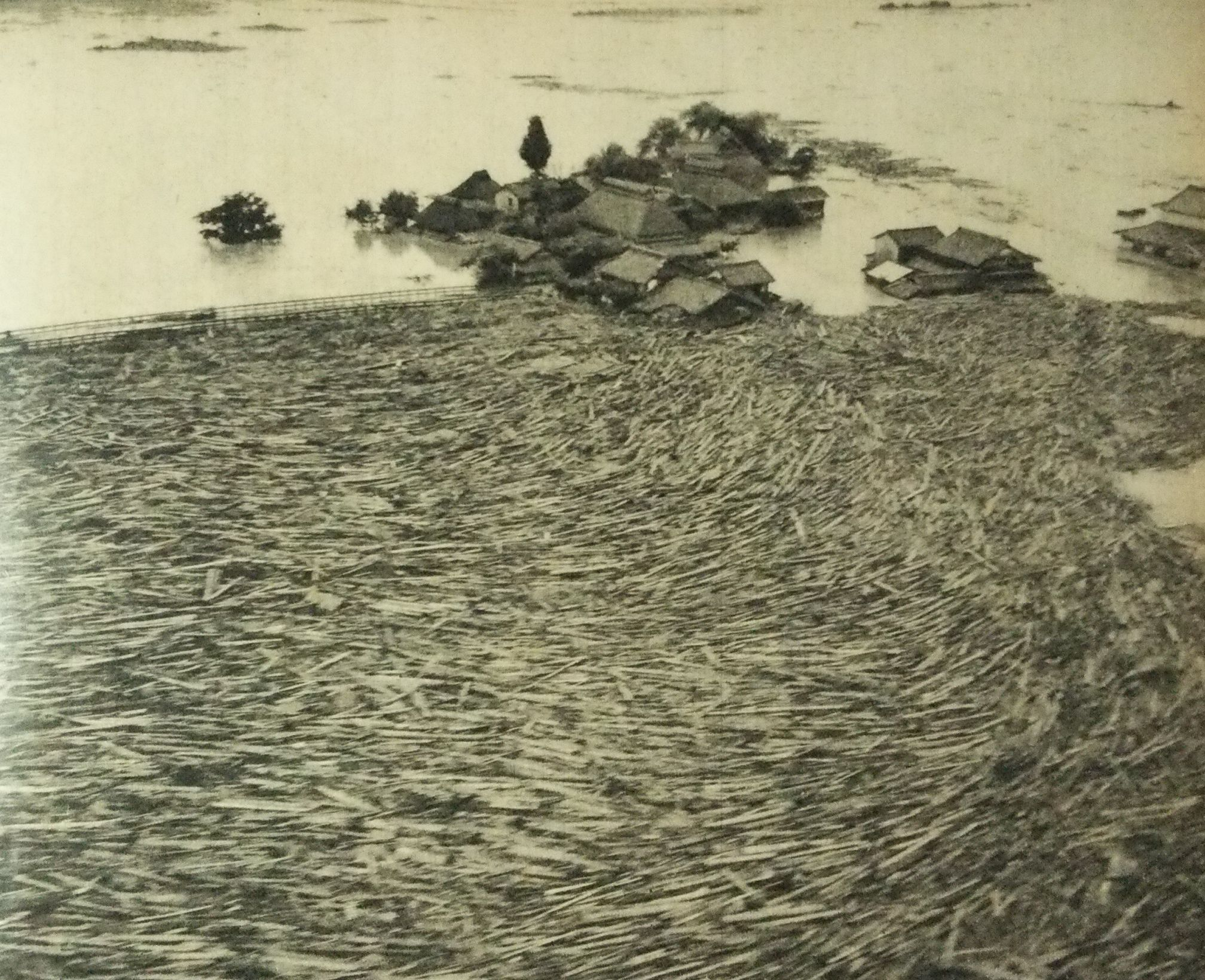
- Driftwood advancing on Daifuku village, Fukuoka

Meteorological history
- Duration: 25 June 1953–29 June 1953

Overall effects
- Fatalities: 771
- Damage: ¥222 billion
- Areas affected: Fukuoka Prefecture, Saga Prefecture, Kumamoto Prefecture, Ōita Prefecture and other regions of Northern Kyushu

The 1953 North Kyushu flood was a flood which hit Northern Kyushu, Japan (Fukuoka Prefecture, Saga Prefecture, Kumamoto Prefecture and Ōita Prefecture) in June 1953. The flood was caused by cloudbursts and prolonged rain from the Meiyu rain front which dropped 1,000 mm (3.3 ft.) of rain over Mount Aso and Mount Hiko. This downpour resulted in the overflow of many of the surrounding rivers, such as the Chikugo River.

The flood was a major disaster with 771 people dead or missing, 450,000 houses flooded, and about 1 million people affected. Due to the severity of the disaster, flood control measures along rivers in Northern Kyushu were fundamentally revised, with many of the changes still in place.

The flood was not given an official name by the Japan Meteorological Agency which has resulted in it being referred to differently in a variety of sources. In Kumamoto Prefecture, Shirakawa Great Flood (白川大水害) (Note: In reference to the Shirakawa river which flows down from Mount Aso.) or 6.26 Flood (6.26水害) (Note: 6.26 refers to the 26th day of June) are usually used. In Kitakyushu city, they tend to use North Kyushu Great Flood (北九州大水害).

== Causes ==
The flood was the result of a combination of meteorological and geological factors that contributed to large amounts of precipitation as well as topographical features which exacerbated the effects of the precipitation.

=== Meteorological ===
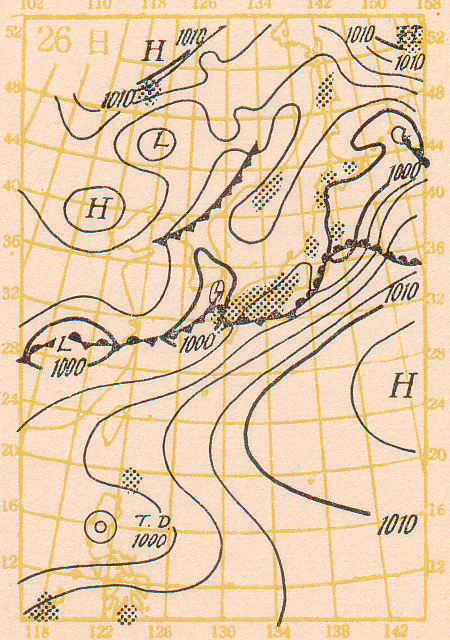
Weather at 9 a.m. June 26 at the time of heaviest rainfall in northern Kyushu. Low pressure in Tsushima. Rainy season front extending toward central China and extending to south of Fukushima

Early June the Meiyu rain front had briefly come to a standstill over north-central Kyushu, raining over the city of Fukuoka and Nagasaki at the start before latter bringing rains over Kumamoto. Later the front moved south over Amami Ōshima before fluctuating between Amami Ōshima and Yakushima. Meanwhile from the south, the Pacific High in the area around the Philippines began to grow in strength and push the rain front into the Tsushima Strait. At the same time a mobile anticyclone from China began pushing the rain front back towards Yakushima. Trapped between these two competing forces the rain front became stabilized over Mount Aso around June 23. Moist, warm air from the high pressure areas stimulated the rain front while low pressure waves that would have normally passed through were instead redirected through the Tsushima Strait. Working in tandem these meteorological conditions generated the cloudbursts and prolonged rain that led to the unprecedented amount of precipitation over northern Kyushu.

==== Precipitation ====
Amounts of Precipitation
Point of Measurement	Total Amount (June 25–29)	Amount on maximum precipitation day
Uenoda, Ōita	1,148.5	400.0 (June 26)
Miyahara, Kumamoto	1,002.6	426.2 (June 25)
Oguni, Kumamoto	994.6	433.6 (June 25)
Yabe, Fukuoka	934.2	395,0 (June 25)
Nogami, Ōita	929.7	364.0 (June 25)
Kurokawa, Kumamoto	888.4	500.2 (June 26)
Hita, Ōita	705.6	292.4 (June 25)
Ōita, Ōita	698.5	223.1 (June 26)
Moji, Fukuoka	646.1	398.3 (June 28)
Fukuoka, Fukuoka	621.4	307.8 (June 25)
Kumamoto, Kumamoto	595.9	411.9 (June 26)
Saga, Saga	587.1	366.5 (June 25)
Kurume, Fukuoka	564.3	308.7 (June 25)
Iizuka, Fukuoka	534.8	235.5 (June 25)

=== Geographical ===
In addition to the heavy precipitation, geographical factors contributed to and exacerbated the flood. Mount Aso, one of the largest active volcanoes in the world, has produced throughout the surrounding area a lava cap of andesite which is poorly permeable to water. Additionally, deforestation during and after the Second Would War had decreased the local water retention capacity. These factors combined to allow the precipitation to quickly flow unimpeded into nearby waterways which subsequently exceeded their capacities. Furthermore, just two months prior on April 27, Mt. Aso had erupted and deposited 5.16 metric tons of ash which combined with the rain water to produce a debris flow.

Topographically, the rivers in northern Kyushu tend to follow steep grades which cause them to flow rapidly downstream. Additionally the river systems in the area have larger drainage basins upstream than middle- and downstream with the Shirakawa River and Chikugo River having drainage basin ratios of 80% and 70% respectively between their upstream and downstream systems. These topographical features resulted in the upstream systems quickly accumulating and transporting water in amounts that the lower stream systems couldn't handle.

== Flood ==
=== Flood in Kumamoto, 6.26 Great Flood ===
- In Kumamoto Prefecture, the central river Shirakawa flooded most severely, and people remember it by the name of 6.26 Suigai (flood). The factors of the 6.26 flood were: heavy rain in the Aso district (in Kurokawa mura), the rainfall reached 888.4 mm in 5 days, another factor being the soil of the areas; it contained layers rich in yona (volcanic ash) over lava; which easily liquefies on heavy rain.
  - A similar event was seen in 1993 Kagoshima Heavy Rain.
- On April 27, Mount Aso erupted and a great amount of volcanic ash which fell was mixed with rain; producing peculiar debris flow in the Kurokawa river and Shirakawa river merging into Shirakawa into Kumamoto.
- The third factor was the Kumamoto city; the river Shirakawa was the so-called tenjo-kawa, or a ceiling river, namely, the river bed is higher than its surroundings such as Shimotori. These factors worsened the damage of the flood.
- 70% of the then Kumamoto city was flooded, except the Kyomachi Hills and Kengun area. The central areas of Kumamoto City were 2.5 meters to 3 meters deep in muddy water. 15 bridges out of 17 in the city were carried away except Taiko Bridge and Choroku Bridge. Kokaibashi was carried away with 40 inhabitants.
- The disposal of 60 billion tons of muddy soil presented big problems; 116 areas including a moat of the Kumamoto Castle were used. The Kumamoto city gave subsidies to clean up the streets; ¥2,000 for bicycle trailers, ¥4,500 for 3-wheel cars and ¥10,750 for a truck; producing many small enterprises with trucks.
- A house for the aged was destroyed and 52 people were killed.
- The damage amounted to ¥17.3 billion (¥121.93 billion now)
- Even in the southern part of Aso gun, the dead and missing amounted to 66.

=== Flood in Fukuoka Prefecture: Chikugogawa Area ===
The Chikugo River (筑後川, Chikugo-gawa) flows through Kumamoto, Oita, Fukuoka and Saga prefectures in Japan. With a total length of 143 kilometres (89 mi), it is the longest river on Kyushu. It flows from Mount Aso and empties into the Ariake Sea. The river is important to industry, with twenty electrical power plants located along its banks, as well as the major city of Kurume in Fukuoka Prefecture.

- 147 people were killed in the areas of Chikugo River; all areas of Tsukushi plain were flooded, and the Yoake dam which was under construction, the bank of Kasegawa, and the bank of Yabegawa, the area of Homan Gawa were also flooded. 80 percent of Kurume city was flooded; in the center of the city, water was 1 meter deep, 3 meters deep at the deepest. This flood is called one of the three worst floods, including that of 1890 and that of 1921.
- The total damage amounted to ¥79.3 billion, which was equivalent to twice the yearly budget of Fukuoka Prefecture.

== Damage ==
The Japanese Government took appropriate measures comparable with those took for typhoons in 1948. The 5th Yoshida Cabinet (Government) placed "Nishinihon (West Japan) flood countermeasure center" in Fukuoka City. Not only National Safety Forces(which later became Land Force), but also American soldiers helped. The people in the flooded areas greatly appreciated the supply of free food and water, while they thought the flood was a natural disaster and could not be helped.

=== Estimates published by the National Regional Police Fukuoka Center ===
Damage of 1953 North Kyushu Flood
Prefecture	Dead Persons	Missing Persons	Injured Persons	Houses swept away	Half destroyed	Flooded above floor	Flooded partly	Amounts of damage (in ¥100 million)
Fukuoka	259	27	1,402	1,321	829	12,116	92,532	119,127	793
Saga	59	3	337	319	108	4,425	37,895	38,053	249
Nagasaki	59	3	337	319	108	4,425	37,895	38,053	249
Kumamoto	339	198	558	1,009	850	10,412	49,038	39,607	850
Ōita	55	13	239	333	653	1,435	6,179	18,513	178

== Countermeasures ==
1953 was the year of great disasters; the heavy rain in the south Kishu area, Wakayama Prefecture, with 1,046 people dead and missing and in the Minami Yamashiro area (105 people were killed). The causes were attributed to reckless deforestation, and the lack of water control after the second world war. The damaged Yoake Dam was investigated but the inadequate water control of the upper river was found to blame. The Japanese Government decided to follow America and its Tenessey Valley Corporation and started to build many dams such as, Matsubara Dam, Shimauch Tsutsumi (Chikugo River), Shimouke Dam (Tsue River), Ōishi, Harazuru, Sennenbunsuiro (Chikugo River), Chikugoooseki, Terauchi Dam (Sata River), Ishiharagawa Dam, Ōishi Dam, Jouharagawa Dam, Hyugakami Dam, Masubuchi Dam, Aburagi Dam, and Jin-ya Dam. In 2009, the countermeasures were again under review in view of the global warming and heat island phenomenon and the outbreaks of heavy rainfall in Northern Kyushu in 2009.

== See also ==
- History of Kumamoto Prefecture
- 1957 Kyushu flood

== Sources ==
- Kuniaki Sonoda, 1953 Great Flood Data and Photographs園田国昭 昭和28年大水害写真資料展
- 建設省九州地方建設局筑後川工事事務所『筑後川五十年史』：1976年
- 建設省河川局監修・財団法人ダム技術センター編『日本の多目的ダム 直轄編』1990年版：山海堂。1990年
- 建設省河川局監修・財団法人ダム技術センター編『日本の多目的ダム 補助編』1990年版：山海堂。1990年
- 園田国昭 「昭和28年西日本大水害」の概況：九州大学附属図書館。2003年 - 水害写真展
- 内閣府政府広報室 西日本水害に関する世論調査
- 北九州市 昭和28年の北九州大水害
- 災害伝承情報データベース 昭和28年西日本水害
- 西日本新聞 ワードBOX 昭和28年水害
- 熊本県 熊本県の災害要因と被災状況
- 新聞に見る世相熊本 昭和編 6.26水害 熊本を襲う 熊本日日新聞社 熊本. p. 178
- 6.26 白川水害50年(2003) 熊本日日新聞 熊本 ISBN 978-4-87755-149-0
- The records of the 6.26 great flood, in New Kumamoto City History(1995), Volume 8, p236-250.
