= Ohkiribata Dam =

Dam in Kumamoto Prefecture, Japan

- Location within Japan
- Official name: 大切畑ダム
- Location: Kumamoto Prefecture, Japan
- Coordinates: 32°50′28″N 130°55′52″E
- Construction began: 1970
- Opening date: 1975

Dam and spillways
- Height: 23 m (75 ft)
- Length: 125 m (410 ft)

Reservoir
- Total capacity: 851,000 m^{3} (30,100,000 cu ft)
- Catchment area: 11.6 km^{2} (4.5 sq mi)
- Surface area: 9 hectares (22 acres)

Ohkiribata Dam (Japanese: 大切畑ダム) is an earthfill dam located in Kumamoto Prefecture in Japan. The dam is used for irrigation. The catchment area of the dam is 11.6 km^{2}. The dam impounds about 9 ha of land when full and can store 851 thousand cubic meters of water. The construction of the dam was started on 1970 and completed in 1975.

== See also ==
- List of dams in Japan
