= Midorikawa Hojo Dam =

Dam in Kumamoto Prefecture, Japan

- Location within Japan
- Official name: 緑川補助ダム
- Location: Kumamoto Prefecture, Japan
- Coordinates: 32°37′47″N 130°54′23″E
- Construction began: 1964
- Opening date: 1970

Dam and spillways
- Height: 35 m (115 ft)
- Length: 244 m (801 ft)

Reservoir
- Total capacity: 46000 thousand cubic meters
- Catchment area: 359 sq. km
- Surface area: 181 hectares

Midorikawa Hojo Dam (Japanese: 緑川補助ダム) is a rockfill dam located in Kumamoto Prefecture in Japan. The dam is used for flood control, irrigation and power production. The catchment area of the dam is 359 km^{2}. The dam impounds about 181 ha of land when full and can store 46000 thousand cubic meters of water. The construction of the dam was started on 1964 and completed in 1970.

== See also ==
- List of dams in Japan
