= Itsuwatobu Dam =

Dam in Kumamoto Prefecture, Japan

- Location within Japan
- Interactive map of Itsuwatobu Dam
- Official name: 五和東部ダム
- Location: Kumamoto Prefecture, Japan
- Coordinates: 32°28′58″N 130°8′44″E
- Construction began: 1995
- Opening date: 2002

Dam and spillways
- Height: 33.3 m (109 ft)
- Length: 170 m (560 ft)

Reservoir
- Total capacity: 739 thousand cubic meters
- Catchment area: 1.6 sq. km
- Surface area: 8 hectares

Itsuwatobu Dam (Japanese: 五和東部ダム) is a rockfill dam located in Kumamoto Prefecture in Japan. The dam is used for irrigation and water supply. The catchment area of the dam is 1.6 km^{2}. The dam impounds about 8 ha of land when full and can store 739 thousand cubic meters of water. The construction of the dam was started on 1995 and completed in 2002.

== See also ==
- List of dams in Japan
