= Aburatani Dam =

Dam in Kumamoto Prefecture, Japan

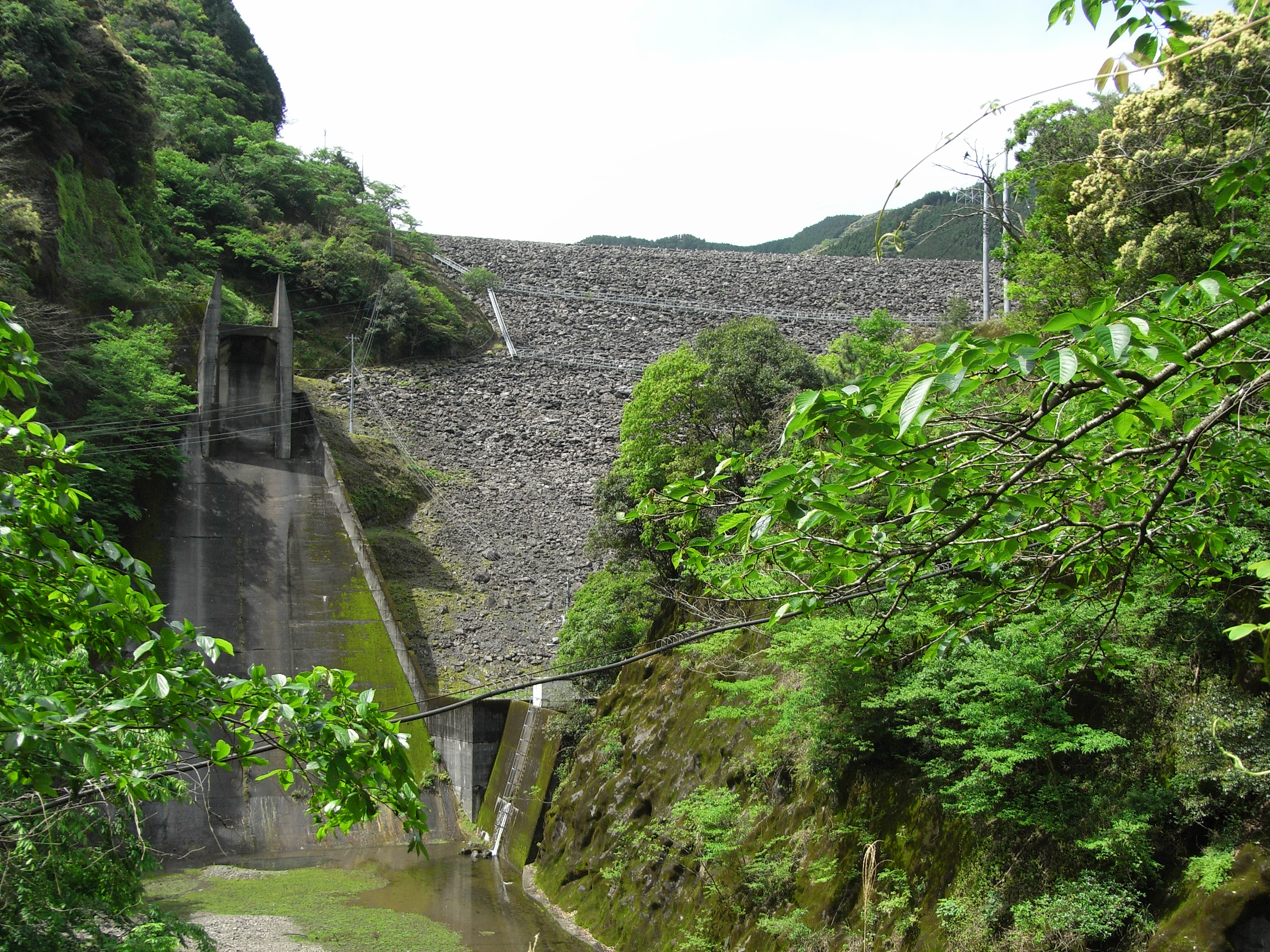

- Location within Japan
- Official name: 油谷ダム
- Location: Kumamoto Prefecture, Japan
- Coordinates: 32°25′18″N 130°41′45″E
- Construction began: 1970
- Opening date: 1975

Dam and spillways
- Height: 82 m (269 ft)
- Length: 189.2 m (621 ft)

Reservoir
- Total capacity: 5420 thousand cubic meters
- Catchment area: 13.8 sq. km
- Surface area: 23 hectares

Aburatani Dam (Japanese: 油谷ダム) is a rockfill dam located in Kumamoto Prefecture in Japan. The dam is used for power production. The catchment area of the dam is 13.8 km^{2}. The dam impounds about 23 ha of land when full and can store 5420 thousand cubic meters of water. The construction of the dam was started on 1970 and completed in 1975.

== See also ==
- List of dams in Japan
