= Dogsred =

Japanese manga series

- First tankōbon volume cover

ドッグスレッド (Doggusureddo)
- Genre: Sports (ice hockey)
- Manga
- Written by: Satoru Noda
- Published by: Shueisha
- English publisher: NA: Viz Media
- Imprint: Young Jump Comics
- Magazine: Weekly Young Jump
- Original run: July 27, 2023 – present
- Volumes: 9
- icon

Dogsred (Japanese: ドッグスレッド, Hepburn: Doggusureddo) is a Japanese manga series written and illustrated by Satoru Noda. It is a relaunch of Noda's manga series Supinamarada! (2011–2012). Dogsred has been serialized in Shueisha's seinen manga magazine Weekly Young Jump since July 2023, with its chapters collected in nine tankōbon volumes as of September 2026.

== Plot ==
The story is set in the 2010s. At the All-Japan Junior Figure Skating Championships, Rou Shirakawa achieved the highest score ever recorded, but then suddenly went on a rampage. Disqualified from the competition he should have won, he was permanently banned from figure skating. Now nicknamed "The Rabid Dog Prince", Rou ends up in Tomakomai, a town in Hokkaido that is very passionate about ice hockey. He joins a local high school ice hockey team.

== Publication ==
Before starting publication, Shueisha's seinen manga magazine Weekly Young Jump had announced in April 2022 that manga author would relaunch his manga series Supinamarada! (2011–2012). The series' title was announced on July 20, 2023, and the series started the following week in Weekly Young Jump on July 27. Shueisha has collected its chapters into individual tankōbon volumes, with the first one released on January 16, 2024. As of September 17, 2026, nine volumes have been released.

Viz Media is publishing the series' chapters in English simultaneously with the Japanese release through its Shonen Jump digital service. In June 2024, Viz Media announced the print release of the manga starting, with the first volume released on March 18, 2025.

=== Volumes ===
No.	Original release date	Original ISBN	English release date	English ISBN
1	January 18, 2024	978-4-08-893086-2	March 18, 2025	978-1-9747-4892-1
1. "Rabid Prince" (狂犬王子, Kyōken Ōji); 2. "Routine" (ルーティン, Rūtin); 3. "The Last Miyamori Junior High Ice Hockey Team" (最後の宮森中学アイスホッケー部, Saigo no Miyamori Chūgaku Aisu Hokkē-bu); 4. "An Intriguing Player" (面白いのがひとり, Omoshiroi no ga hitori); 5. "A Small Spark" (小さな火種, Chiisana hidane); 6. "The Trick to Receiving" (レシーブをするコツ, Reshību o suru Kotsu); 7. "One Goal" (一矢, Isshi)
2	February 19, 2024	978-4-08-893087-9	June 17, 2025	978-1-9747-5472-4
8. "Ice Hockey Town" (アイスホッケーの町, Aisu Hokkē no Machi); 9. "Oino-Kami High School" (狼之神高校, Ōinokami Kōkō); 10. "Loss of Control" (制御不能, Seigyo Funō); 11. "The Throne" (王座, Ōza); 12. "Frustration" (挫折, Zasetsu); 13. "Miraculous Protective Gear" (奇跡の防具, Kiseki no Bōgu); 14. "Prospective Team Members" (入部希望者, Nyūbu Kibōsha); 15. "Experimental Forest" (演習林, Enshūrin); 16. "The Old Woman's Water" (ババア水, Babaa-sui)
3	July 18, 2024	978-4-08-893309-2	September 16, 2025	978-1-9747-5794-7
17. "Sanno Uphill Dash" (山王坂道ダッシュ, Sannō Sakamichi Dasshu); 18. "On-Ice Training" (氷上練習, Hyōjō Renshū); 19. "Ice Time" (アイスタイム, Aisu Taimu); 20. "Killer Move" (必殺技, Hissatsu-waza); 21. "Summit" (峠, Tōge); 22. "Peep Peep" (ピヨピヨ, Piyo-piyo); 23. "Guts" (ド根性, Dokonjō); 24. "Still at the Top" (最高のままで, Saikō no mama de)
4	November 19, 2024	978-4-08-893468-6	December 16, 2025	978-1-9747-5795-4
25. "Giant God Soldier" (巨神兵ちゃん, Kyoshinhei-Chan); 26. "Your Goal" (君のゴール, Kimi no Gōru); 27. "Oino-Kami's Captain" (狼之神のキャプテン, Oinokami no Kyaputen); 28. "Smokestack" (煙突, Entotsu); 29. "War Criminal" (戦犯, Senpan); 30. "Oino-Kami First-Years" (狼之神一年生, Oinokami Ichinensei); 31. "Sapporo Festival" (札幌まつり, Sapporo Matsuri); 32. "Oino-Kami VS. Sekka" (狼之神VS雪花, Oinokami VS Sekka)
5	April 17, 2025	978-4-08-893618-5	March 17, 2026	978-1-9747-6234-7
33. "Rough Play" (ラフプレー, Rafu Purē); 34. "Beautiful Ice Hockey" (美しいアイスホッケー, Utsukushii Aisu Hokkē); 35. "Penalty Kill" (キルプレー, Kiru Purē); 36. "Little Doggy Pees Itself" (おもらしワンちゃん, Omorashi Wan-chan); 37. "Fighting" (ファイティング, Faitingu); 38. "Easy Shortcut" (安易な近道, An'i na Chikamichi); 39. "Guidance" (指導, Shidō); 40. "Mom" (お母さん, Okāsan)
6	August 19, 2025	978-4-08-893739-7	August 18, 2026	978-1-9747-1680-7
41. "Independent Training" (自主トレ, Jishutore); 42. "Preparing to Win" (勝つための準備, Katsu Tame no Junbi); 43. "Desperation" (闇雲に, Yamikumo ni); 44. "Closure" (けじめ, Kejime); 45. "Uniform" (ユニフォーム, Unifōmu); 46. "Encounter" (遭遇, Sōgū); 47. "Skill Contest" (スキルコンテスト, Sukiru Contesuto); 48. "The Elite Skater and The Dangler" (エリート・スケーターとダングラー, Erīto Sukētā to Dangurā)
7	January 19, 2026	978-4-08-894060-1	February 16, 2027	978-1-9747-6951-3
8	May 19, 2026	978-4-08-894242-1	—	—
9	September 17, 2026	978-4-08-894315-2	—	—

=== Chapters not yet in tankōbon format ===
- 49. "The Whole Dream (夢のすべて, Yume no Subete)
- 50. "First Official Game (公式戦デビュー, Kōshiki-sen Debyū)
- 51. "How to Stop The Clock (試合を止める方法, Shiai o Tomeru Hōhō)
- 52. "Slapshot" (スラップ・ショット, Surappu Shotto)
- 53. "Out of Bounds" (アウト・オブ・バウンズ, Auto Obu Baunzu)
- 54. "On Purpose" (ワザ, Waza)

== Reception ==
The manga placed fourth in the 2024 Next Manga Award in the print category; it was nominated for the 2025 edition in the same category and placed tenth. It ranked 23rd on the 2024 "Book of the Year" list by Da Vinci magazine. In 2026, the series was nominated in the Daruma for Best Action Manga category at the Japan Expo Awards.
