= Kamegawa Dam =

Dam in Kumamoto Prefecture, Japan

- Location within Japan
- Interactive map of Kamegawa Dam
- Official name: 亀川ダム
- Location: Kumamoto Prefecture, Japan
- Coordinates: 32°25′55″N 130°8′04″E
- Construction began: 1968
- Opening date: 1982

Dam and spillways
- Height: 37 m (121 ft)
- Length: 110 m (360 ft)

Reservoir
- Total capacity: 2650 thousand cubic meters
- Catchment area: 10.2 sq. km
- Surface area: 24 hectares

Kamegawa Dam (Japanese: 亀川ダム) is a gravity dam located in Kumamoto Prefecture in Japan. The dam is used for flood control and water supply. The catchment area of the dam is 10.2 km^{2}. The dam impounds about 24 ha of land when full and can store 2650 thousand cubic meters of water. The construction of the dam was started on 1968 and completed in 1982.

== See also ==
- List of dams in Japan
