= Nishigochi Dam =

Dam in Kumamoto Prefecture, Japan

- Location within Japan
- Official name: 西河内ダム
- Location: Kumamoto Prefecture, Japan
- Coordinates: 32°25′19″N 130°23′19″E
- Construction began: 1967
- Opening date: 1970

Dam and spillways
- Height: 17.5 m (57 ft)
- Length: 68.8 m (226 ft)

Reservoir
- Total capacity: 22,000 m^{3} (780,000 cu ft)
- Surface area: 1 hectare (2.5 acres)

Nishigochi Dam (Japanese: 西河内ダム) is a gravity dam located in Kumamoto Prefecture in Japan. The dam is used for irrigation. The dam impounds about 1 ha of land when full and can store 22 thousand cubic meters of water. The construction of the dam was started on 1967 and completed in 1970.

== See also ==
- List of dams in Japan
