= Supinamarada! =

Japanese manga series

- Cover of the first bound volume

スピナマラダ!
- Genre: Sports (ice hockey)
- Manga
- Written by: Satoru Noda
- Published by: Shueisha
- Imprint: Young Jump Comics
- Magazine: Weekly Young Jump
- Original run: July 14, 2011 – November 1, 2012
- Volumes: 6
- Revival
- Dogsred (2023–present)
- icon

Supinamarada! (Japanese: スピナマラダ!) (Note: As derived from the ice hockey term spinorama (supinarama in Japanese), spelt as if spoken in a Hokkaido dialect.) is a Japanese sports manga series written and illustrated by Satoru Noda. The series follows a figure skater who, after moving to Hokkaido following the death of his mother, begins playing ice hockey.

The series was originally serialized in Shueisha's manga magazine Weekly Young Jump from July 2011 to November 2012. Supinamarada! was a commercial failure during its initial serialization, though acclaim for Noda's subsequent manga series Golden Kamuy led to renewed critical recognition for the series. A relaunch of the series, titled Dogsred, began serialization in Weekly Young Jump in July 2023.

== Synopsis ==
Fifteen year old figure skater Shirakawa Rou's mother dies in a car accident the day before his qualifying performance for the Olympic Games, rendering him grief-stricken and unable to compete. Now orphaned, Shirakawa and his twin sister Haruna are forced to relocate from Tokyo to the home of their maternal grandfather in Tomakomai, Hokkaido. After an encounter with the hockey-loving Genma brothers, Shirakawa decides to join the school's ice hockey team. The series follows Shirakawa as he learns to play the sport and competes against the hockey teams of rival schools.

== Production ==
Supinamarada! was creator Satoru Noda's first manga series after nearly a decade as an artist assistant. Noda has stated that the inspiration for Supinamarada! was a desire to create a story that was both about hockey and set in his home of Hokkaido. While sports manga about hockey have been produced in the past, notably My Heavenly Hockey Club and Go!! Southern Ice Hockey Club, Noda has remarked that relative to other sports, hockey is not a ubiquitous sport in the medium.

== Publication ==
The series was serialized in the manga magazine Weekly Young Jump from July 14, 2011, to November 1, 2012. Shueisha collected its chapters in six tankōbon (bound volumes), released from November 18, 2011, to December 19, 2012 A one-shot spin-off chapter was later published in the manga magazine Aoharu on February 1, 2013.

=== Volumes ===
No.	Release date	ISBN
1	November 18, 2011	978-4-08-879233-0
2	January 19, 2012	978-4-08-879315-3
3	April 19, 2012	978-4-08-879315-3
4	July 19, 2012	978-4-08-879373-3
5	October 19, 2012	978-4-08-879430-3
6	December 19, 2012	978-4-08-879576-8

== Reception and legacy ==
In an interview with Asahi Shimbun, Noda stated that Supinamarada! was a commercial failure during its initial serialization, and was discontinued after 15 months at the recommendation of his editor. Noda has speculated that the series' hard-to-remember title and slow initial chapters may have contributed to its inability to find an audience. The widespread acclaim for Noda's subsequent manga series Golden Kamuy has led to renewed critical recognition for Supinamarada!; the works are linked through the Supinamarada! character Toshimitsu Nihei, whose name and character design are identical to Tetsuzō Nihei of Golden Kamuy.

=== Revival ===
Weekly Young Jump announced plans to relaunch Supinamarada! on April 28, 2022, with serialization slated to commence on July 27, 2023. On July 20, 2023, Weekly Young Jump reported that the revival of the series would be titled Dogsred.
