= Uchitani Dam =

Dam in Kumamoto Prefecture, Japan

- Location within Japan
- Official name: 内谷ダム
- Location: Kumamoto Prefecture, Japan
- Coordinates: 32°25′20″N 130°43′54″E
- Construction began: 1970
- Opening date: 1975

Dam and spillways
- Height: 64 m (210 ft)
- Length: 200 m (660 ft)

Reservoir
- Total capacity: 5,383,000 m^{3} (190,100,000 cu ft)
- Catchment area: 2.4 km^{2} (0.93 sq mi)
- Surface area: 31 hectares (77 acres)

Uchitani Dam (Japanese: 内谷ダム) is a rockfill, hydroelectric dam located in Kumamoto Prefecture in Japan. The catchment area of the dam is 2.4 km^{2}. The dam impounds about 31 ha of land when full and can store 5383 thousand cubic meters of water. The construction of the dam was started on 1970 and completed in 1975.

== See also ==
- List of dams in Japan
