= Yairagi No.2 Dam =

Dam in Kumamoto Prefecture, Japan

- Location within Japan
- Official name: 第２ヤイラギダム
- Location: Kumamoto Prefecture, Japan
- Coordinates: 32°14′45″N 130°2′00″E
- Construction began: 1982
- Opening date: 1984

Dam and spillways
- Height: 36.1 m (118 ft)
- Length: 90 m (300 ft)

Reservoir
- Total capacity: 638,000 m^{3} (22,500,000 cu ft)
- Catchment area: 0.4 km^{2}
- Surface area: 6 hectares (15 acres)

Yairagi No.2 Dam (Japanese: 第２ヤイラギダム) is a gravity dam located in Kumamoto Prefecture in Japan. The dam is used for water supply. The catchment area of the dam is 0.4 km^{2}. The dam impounds about 6 ha of land when full and can store 638 thousand cubic meters of water. The construction of the dam was started on 1982 and completed in 1984.

== See also ==
- List of dams in Japan
