= Midorikawa Dam =

Dam in Kumamoto Prefecture, Japan

- Location within Japan
- Official name: 緑川ダム
- Location: Kumamoto Prefecture, Japan
- Coordinates: 32°37′37″N 130°54′32″E
- Construction began: 1964
- Opening date: 1970

Dam and spillways
- Height: 76.5 m (251 ft)
- Length: 295.3 m (969 ft)

Reservoir
- Total capacity: 46000 thousand cubic meters
- Catchment area: 359 sq. km
- Surface area: 181 hectares

Midorikawa Dam (Japanese: 緑川ダム) is a gravity dam located in Kumamoto Prefecture in Japan. The dam is used for flood control, irrigation and power production. The catchment area of the dam is 359 km^{2}. The dam impounds about 181 ha of land when full and can store 46000 thousand cubic meters of water. The construction of the dam was started on 1964 and completed in 1970.

== See also ==
- List of dams in Japan
