= Amagimi Dam =

Dam in Kumamoto Prefecture, Japan

- Location within Japan
- Interactive map of Amagimi Dam
- Official name: 天君ダム
- Location: Kumamoto Prefecture, Japan
- Coordinates: 32°44′22″N 130°50′29″E
- Construction began: 1961
- Opening date: 1970

Dam and spillways
- Height: 39 m (128 ft)
- Length: 195 m (640 ft)

Reservoir
- Total capacity: 1661 thousand cubic meters
- Catchment area: 14.7 sq. km
- Surface area: 15 hectares

Amagimi Dam (Japanese: 天君ダム) is a gravity dam located in Kumamoto Prefecture in Japan. The dam is used for flood control. The catchment area of the dam is 14.7 km^{2}. The dam impounds about 15 ha of land when full and can store 1661 thousand cubic meters of water. The construction of the dam was started on 1961 and completed in 1970.

== See also ==
- List of dams in Japan
