= 1993 Kagoshima flood =

1993 flood in Kagoshima, Japan

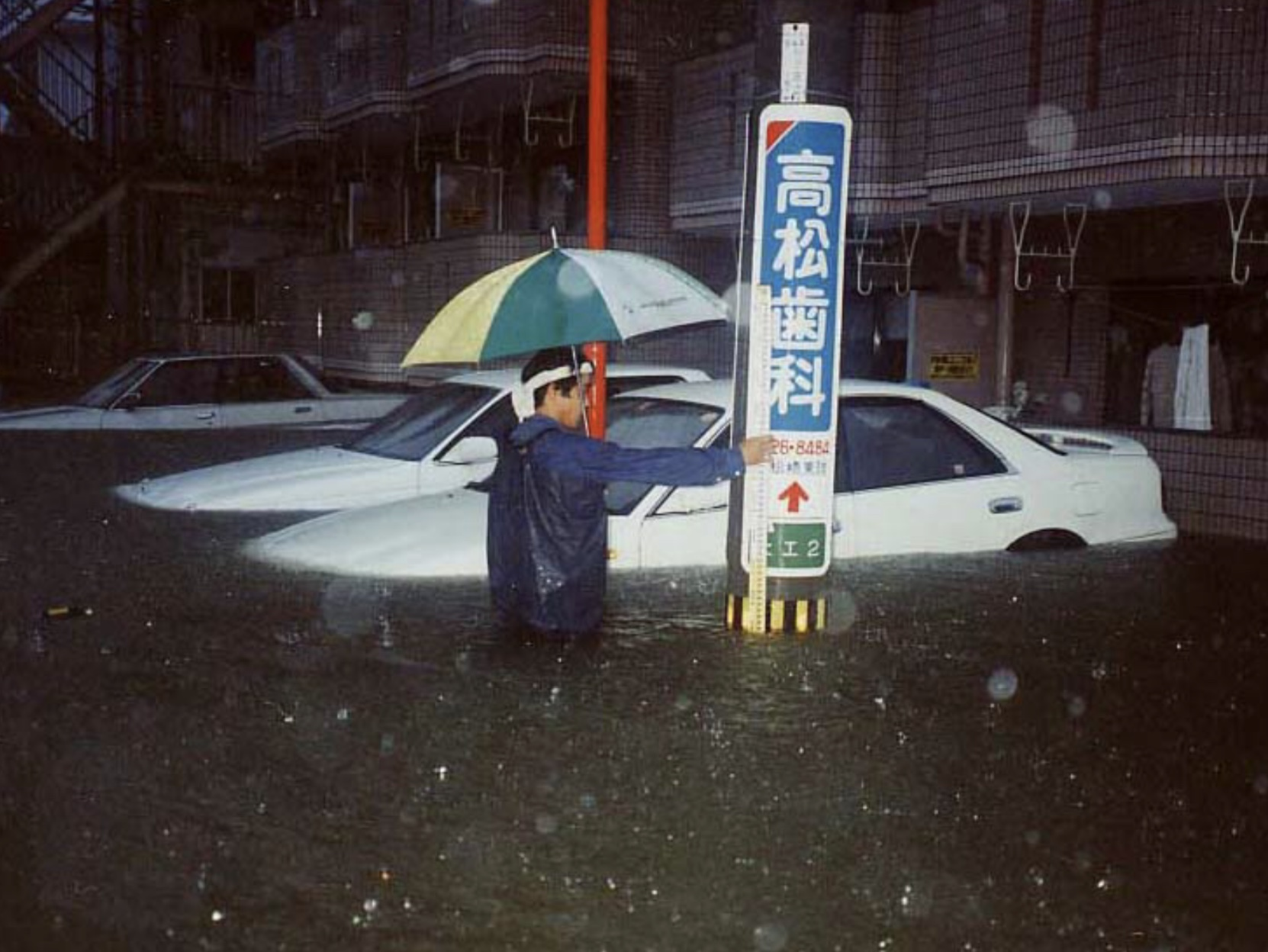
- Date: 1 August 1993 – 6 August 1993; 33 years ago
- Location: Aira District, Kagoshima Prefecture, Japan Kagoshima city, Japan
- Cause: Heavy rainfall Max. rainfall: 550mm (17.72in), Mizobe; Max. rainfall per hour: 99.5mm (3.92in), Kōriyama
- Deaths: 71 (142 injured)
- Property damage: 437 buildings completely destroyed 208 buildings partially destroyed 593 buildings damaged 9,118 buildings flooded above 1st floor 7,315 buildings flooded at/below 1st floor

The 1993 Kagoshima flood (平成5年8月豪雨, Heisei 5-nen 8-gatsu gōu; lit. August 1993 heavy rain) was a series of heavy torrential rains which hit Kagoshima, Japan with debris flow in the early part of August 1993. The death toll was 71, and about 2,500 people who were in cars, buses and trains were saved by fishing boats and ferries which carried them to Kagoshima through the Kagoshima Bay.

== Weather in 1993 ==
The 1993 Japanese rainy season was longer than usual, as a high pressure area in the Pacific Ocean was weak, marking a cold summer. The Japan Meteorological Agency had earlier declared the end of the rainy season only to cancel it. Toward the end of July, three typhoons made landfall; of them, two on Kyushu. In August, Typhoon Robyn came close to Kyushu, and toward the end of August, Typhoon Vernon approached the Kanto area and later landed on Hokkaido. A total of six typhoons landed in Japan. The cold summer lowered production of rice and led to the rice shortages in the Heisei era.

== Weather in Kyushu ==
The total rain amounted to 1000 mm in southern Kyushu, causing landslides or floods. On August 1, torrential rain in the Aira district reached 104 mm an hour at Mizobe, 405 mm in one day. The death toll reached 23 in the central parts of Kagoshima Prefecture. National Highway No.10, Kyushu Expressway Motorway and Japan Railway railroads were completely out of service. Buildings in the Sakurajima Service Area were destroyed. On August 6, Kagoshima city was badly hit with 99.8 mm /hour rain (at Kohriyamacho). There were 48 people who were killed and one was lost. Of the five stone bridges built in the Edo era on Kohtsuki River, two were destroyed.

== Damage ==
The damage caused by the debris flow was large. In the Ryugamizu area, where mountains were close to the sea, and highways and railroads are situated, 22 debris flows occurred and 2500 people were trapped in 1200 cars, as well as buses and trains, until they were saved by fishing boats and ferrys which carried them to Kagoshima city through Kagoshima Bay.
