= Golden Kamuy (disambiguation) =

Golden Kamuy is a Japanese manga series written and illustrated by Satoru Noda.

Golden Kamuy may also refer to:

- Golden Kamuy (film)
- Golden Kamuy season 1
- Golden Kamuy season 2
- Golden Kamuy season 3
- Golden Kamuy season 4
- List of Golden Kamuy chapters
- List of Golden Kamuy characters
- List of Golden Kamuy episodes
