= Golden Kamuy season 3 =

Season of television series

Golden Kamuy
- Season 3
- Cover of the seventh home media volume as released by NBCUniversal Entertainment Japan
- No. of episodes: 12

Release
- Original network: Tokyo MX
- Original release: October 5 – December 21, 2020

Season chronology
- ← Previous; Season 2 Next → Season 4

The third season of the Golden Kamuy anime television series is based on Satoru Noda's manga series of the same name and adapts from the 15th volume to the 20th (chapters 140–201). In July 2019, it was announced that the series would receive a third season. The staff and cast returned to reprise their roles. On March 13, 2020, it was announced that the third season would premiere in October 2020. The season aired from October 5 to December 21, 2020, and ran for 12 episodes. The opening theme is "Grey" by Fomare while the ending theme is "Yūsetsu" by The Sixth Lie.

Crunchyroll streamed the third season in North America, Central America, South America, Europe, Africa, Oceania, the Middle East, and the Commonwealth of Independent States. Funimation streamed the third season with an English dub at a later date.

== Episodes ==
No. overall	No. in season	Title (Note: English translated titles are taken from Crunchyroll.)	Directed by	Written by	Storyboarded by	Original release date
25	1	"To Karafuto"; Transliteration: "Karafuto e" (Japanese: 樺太ヘ)	Yutaka Hirata	Noboru Takagi	Namimi Sanjo	October 5, 2020
A ship with Lt. Koito, Tsukishima, Sugimoto and Tanigaki arrives at Sakhalin on the trail of Kiroranke. They find Cikapasi stowed away on board, but Sugimoto and Tanigaki believe he can help them find Asirpa. While Lieutenant Koito visits a shop to sample local Hurep wine, they learn that Asirpa has been taken to an Ainu village further north. They go after her, but find another Ainu girl, Enonoka who saw Asirpa. On the way to her village, the group is attacked by a wolverine and Koito is bitten, however they are rescued by Enonoka's grandfather with his dog sled. Meanwhile, at Abashiri, Lt. Tsurumi is searching for Hijikata's group who is in fact heading to Kushiro searching for another convict. At the Ainu village, Sugimoto's group learn that Asirpa has been taken further north towards a Russian village and they follow the trail by dog sled. They arrive at the small village of Karafuto where Sugimoto gets into a tavern fight and beats a Russian who was scheduled to fight in a Stenka. (Note: Stenka na Stenku is a Russian "Wall to Wall" knockout fight between a group of bare-chested men.) A Russian steals the lead dog to pressure Sugimoto's group into fighting in the Stenka. Hoping that tattooed prisoners may attend the event, the four Japanese agree to fight four Russians. Sugimoto's group wins the bout, but they also attract the attention of a large Japanese man in the audience.
26	2	"Stenka"; Transliteration: "Suchenka" (Japanese: スチェンカ)	Shigeru Fukase	Shingo Irie	Masahiro Ando	October 12, 2020
Sugimoto introduces himself to the large Japanese man from the Stenka audience, Maiharu Gansoku, but they speak no further. Through the tavern owner, the Japanese group is asked to throw the fight to have their dog returned, but they angrily decline. Their main opponent at the second Stenka is their target, the tattooed prisoner Gansoku. The bout begins with Sugimoto taking on Gansoku and ends with only Gansoku and the Japanese standing with Sugimoto punch drunk after suffering too many blows to the head. Suddenly, Sugimoto lands a mighty kick on Gansoku, causing a riot. He chases Gansoku into the woods with a hammer and sickle, but so do Koito, Tsukishima, and Tanigaki who find Gansoku being attacked by a wolverine. They all seek shelter in a hut which turns out to be a stiflingly hot banya. (Note: Russian sauna) Meanwhile, Cikapasi and Enonoka rescue their dog, but attract the attention of the wolverine. Sugimoto arrives to finish the fight with Gansoku, but with Tanigaki's help, Cikapasi shoots the wolverine. This activity causes the men all fall through the ice into the freezing water and they return to the banya with Sugimoto. The icy water returns Sugimoto to consciousness and they decide not to kill Gansoku, but instead copy his tattoos and suggest he seek refuge further into Russian territory. Epilogue: Asirpa is seen seal hunting with Kiroranke, Shiraishi and Ogata.
27	3	"Igogusa"; Transliteration: "Igokusa" (Japanese: いご草)	Akira Toba	Aya Yoshinaga	Namimi Sanjo	October 19, 2020
Kiroranke's group arrives at the location of a Karafuto Ainu village where Asirpa's father Wilk was born, but they find that it was abandoned during the Japan-Russian war and is now the location of a silver fox farm. Kiroranke and Ogata confirm that Nopperabo was Wilk and that Asirpa has knowledge that can decode the maps tattooed on the prisoners which they must carefully extract from her. Meanwhile, Tsukishima bids farewell to Gansoku and warns Sugimoto never to go berserk again. Tsukishima's mind drifts back to when he first met Tsurumi while he was on death row in prison for murdering his brutal father. He believed that his father told Igogusa, (Note: She was called Igogusa because her wind-swept hair resembled Igogusa (いご草) seaweed.) the woman he loved, that he had been killed in the Russo-Japanese War and she apparently threw herself into the sea. Tsurumi manipulated him into joining the 7th Division and becoming a Russian interpreter by telling him that Igogusa was still alive. Years later, Tsukishima attacked Tsurumi when he discovered that his commander had lied to him about Igogusa. However, Tsukishima still risked his life to save Tsurumi during a Russian artillery bombardment when Tsurumi lost part of his forehead which is now covered by a ceramic plate.
28	4	"The Immortal Sugimoto Harakiri Show"; Transliteration: "Fujimi no Sugimoto Harakiri Shō" (Japanese: 不死身の杉元ハラキリショー)	Yūki Morita	Shingo Irie	Masahiro Ando	October 26, 2020
Sugimoto's group arrives in Toyohara, centre of Karafuto, and a young boy steals a bag containing the copy of Gansoku's tattoo. Koito chases him to the Yamada Circus and the group offer to join the circus hoping publicity may let Asirpa know that Sugimoto is alive. Koito is the only one with real talent as an acrobatic, so Sugimoto offers to perform the "harikiri" act while Tsukishima and Tanigaki are relegated to join the "dancing girls" act under the harsh dance mistress Fumie. On the day of the performance, Koito dazzles the audience, however, replaces the circus sword with a real one and instead of drawing fake blood, Sugimoto actually cuts himself. Before he has to cut his belly to draw blood, three Russians interrupt the performance to kill him, but he quickly kills two with the sword and Tsukishima downs the third. The surviving Russian reveals that they were really after Yamada who is an Imperial spy. Fumie summarily kills him and they bury the three bodies under the tent. Fortunately, an article about the circus appears in the local newspaper, mentioning the amazing harikiri act of the mis-spelled "Immoral Sugimoto". They ask Yamada if he knows of partisans heading north, and he mentions Alexandrovskaya Prison, 530 kilometers to the north, which houses a number of Eastern resistance fighters.
29	5	"The Border"; Transliteration: "Kokkyō" (Japanese: 国境)	Yutaka Hirata	Daishirō Tanimura	Hiro Shimizu	November 2, 2020
Kiroranke's group had travelled much further north on Sakhalin than Sugimoto believed, and were at near the Russian border although low on supplies. Ogata shoots a reindeer from an Uilta's herd and they are told by the herdsman that they must replace it. (Note: The Uilta (also called Oroks) are a tribe in Karafuto who, like the Nivkh, mainly live in the Russian zone. They are nomadic, living in tents alongside their reindeer herds.) The group go hunting with the herdsman and his son, and when they find a wild herd, Ogata shoots all the reindeer, providing the Uilta with an abundance of food and skins. It is revealed that this is part of Kiroranke's plan to befriend the Uilta and enlist their aid to travel across the border into Russia. Back in Otaru, Tsurumi reveals to Nikaidou that Kiroranke was a teenage member of the group responsible for the assassination of Emperor Alexander II in Russia, and he leaked information to the Russians that Kiroranke was on his way into Russian Sakhalin. Just as Kiroranke's group cross the border disguised as Uilta, a Russian sniper shoots the old Uilta who is carrying Ogata's Japanese rifle. They realize it is an ambush and Ogata manages to shoot the Russian commander, giving them an opportunity to reach the safety of the forest. The wounded commander reveals that Kiroranke's identity has been circulated among Russian troops. Meanwhile, a deadly game of cat and mouse begins between Ogata and the Russian sniper.
30	6	"Bad Sign"; Transliteration: "Akuchō" (Japanese: 悪兆)	Shigeru Fukase	Aya Yoshinaga	Eiji Suganuma	November 9, 2020
Kiroranke explains to Asirpa that he and Wilk were involved in the assassination of Emperor Alexander II. Meanwhile, the Russian sniper suspects that Ogata has set up a decoy and waits all night before making his move. In the morning, he sees an Uilta coffin (Note: The Uilta place their dead in a wooden coffin which is then lodged in the branches of a tree.) and fires a bullet into it, suspecting that Ogata is hiding inside. However, Ogata was waiting for the Russian to reveal his position and shoots him dead. Ogata returns to the others stricken by a high fever from and eating snow and exposure to the cold. In his delirium, he recalls when he attempted to corrupt his younger virtuous half-brother Yuusaku Hanazawa without success, and eventually killed him during a battle. One evening, Shiraishi tries to convince Asirpa to leave with him as he suspects that Kiroranke is only interested in extracting Wilk's code from her. Asirpa refuses to leave, but demands more information about her father from Kiroranke. Days later, Ogata has recovered and Kiroranke decides to leave Shiraishi behind for his own safety, however Shiraishi recalls his promise to Sugimoto to watch over Asirpa, and continues on with them. After they leave, the reindeer shoulder blade used by the Uilta to foretell their future develops more cracks, indicating a bad sign for their journey ahead.
31	7	"Meko Oyasi"; Transliteration: "Meko Oyashi" (Japanese: メコオヤシ)	Kaoru Suzuki	Noboru Takagi	Masahiko Ōkura	November 16, 2020
Sugimoto's group head north on two dog sleds but become separated in a blinding snow storm. Sugimoto, Tanigaki, and Cikapasi reach the shoreline and they dig in to weather the storm using the dogs for warmth. Meanwhile, Koito, Tsukishima, and Enonoka find shelter in a farmhouse. When the farmer returns, he shows them an old lighthouse on the property with a Fresnel lens beacon which can be seen from a great distance. They light it up and it leads Sugimoto's group to the farmhouse. Reunited and refreshed, they prepare to they continue north again by dog sled. In gratitude, Sugimoto offers to search for Svetlana, the daughter of the farmers who was taken years ago by a Russian deserter. Enonoka tells Cikapasi about the rumors of a Meko Oyashi (Note: A huge lynx-like mountain cat.) and Koito suggests that Ogata may be a mountain cat himself. (Note: "Mountain cat" can mean to con or deceive somebody) Meanwhile, Kiroranke's group with Asirpa is further north in Russian territory and they pass through a Karafuto Ainu village near Nittoi. Kiroranke tells Asirpa about the woman Sofia, known as Sonya Golden Hand, who was behind Alexander II's assassination plot and who is now being held in Alexandrovskaya Prison, also known as "Ako". When they arrive at Ako, Kiroranke manages to send a secret message to Sofia, revealing that he is nearby.
32	8	"Manslayer"; Transliteration: "Hitokiri" (Japanese: 人斬り)	Akira Toba	Daishirō Tanimura	Masahiro Ando	November 23, 2020
While Sugimoto's group prepare to move on, Hijikata is in near Kushiro, searching for clues to a small object which the former prisoner called Shinzo Doi, also known as "Yoichiro the Manslayer", had in Abashiri prison. His group meets an Ainu called Kiraushi who explains that the object is a "kotan", part of a male puffin's beak and he takes them to nearby Nemuro where there is a breeding colony. At Nemuro, Yoichiro the Manslayer has become a feeble old man, nearing death. Meanwhile, assassins hired by some families of his victims find him, but he is still fast enough to incapacitate them. Just as one assassin is about to kill Yoichiro, Hijikata arrives. Three more assassins arrive, and a fight ensues during which Yoichiro becomes an assassin again, cutting his way out with a sword and running off. Hijikata follows Yoichiro and cuts the old man down. As Yoichiro bleeds to death, he finally finds peace, regretting the many deaths he caused as a tool of the imperial loyalists. Meanwhile, Kiroranke's group hunt beluga whales off Ako, and after they sit down to have whale soup using some miso that Asirpa had stolen from Sugimoto, Kiroranke reveals his plan to create a mass prison break so their release of Sofia will not be noticed.
33	9	"Revolutionary"; Transliteration: "Kakumeika" (Japanese: 革命家)	Takashi Kumazen	Aya Yoshinaga	Takashi Kumazen	November 30, 2020
Sugimoto's group get closer to Asirpa who is with Kiroranke in Ako. At a Nivkh village in Ako, Kiroranke discovers that other revolutionaries in addition to Sofia are held in the Alexandrovskaya Prison and tells the others that they could help the Ainu. In a flashback, to the period following the assassination of Emperor Alexander II, Kiroranke, Wilk and Sofia fled to Vladivostok. There they met the Japanese photographer Koichi Hasegawa who had opened a photographic studio and married Fina, a local Russian woman. They paid him to teach them Japanese but when the secret police came to the studio, the fugitive revolutionaries thought that they had been discovered. However, the police had come for Hasegawa who was a Japanese spy. In the ensuing gunfight, the police were killed, but Fina and her child were shot by a stray bullet which Sofia thought that she fired, and blamed herself. The Russians decided to head north and cross the Strait of Tartary to Karafuto when it formed an ice bridge, but although Sofia declared her love for Wilk, she decided to stay and fight on as a revolutionary. Kiroranke's plan now is to free Sofia and other revolutionaries from prison and cross back into Russia to continue their fight. In an epilogue, as Fina died, Hasegawa revealed that his real name was Tokushirou Tsurumi.
34	10	"Catching Up to the Wolf"; Transliteration: "Ōkami ni Oitsuku" (Japanese: 狼に追いつく)	Yōji Satō	Shingo Irie	Yoji Sato	December 7, 2020
Kiroranke's group obtain explosives from an abandoned lighthouse and plan to blow holes in the four walls of Ako prison. Unfortunately only one charge works, and as the prisoners head for the hole in the wall, they are confronted by a hungry Siberian tiger. Nevertheless, Sofia and many others make their escape across the ice floe, and she reunites with Kiroranke. She recognizes Asirpa as Wilk's daughter and tells her how Wilk convinced her that the Eastern ethnic minorities needed to unite to protect their culture and heritage. After hearing the explosion, Sugimoto's group reach the prison and see the signs of escape, but as they follow the fugitives, Shiraishi becomes separated from the others by an ice fracture. Sofia tells Asirpa how Wilk was given his name by his father, using the Polish word for wolf after the boy came to respect them for their functional beauty, but also their ruthless, rational logic in ensuring the survival of the pack. Asirpa then recalls that her father told her that her Ainu mother gave Wilk the name Horkew Oskoni, meaning "Catching Up to the Wolf" which he told her to keep secret. Meanwhile, Shiraishi becomes trapped on a piece of tilting ice, but he is suddenly rescued by the arrival of Sugimoto.
35	11	"Sin and Impurity"; Transliteration: "Tsumi Kegare" (Japanese: 罪穢れ)	Shigeru Fukase	Daishirō Tanimura	Satoshi Nishimura	December 14, 2020
Kiroranke and Sugimoto's groups are now near each other on the Strait of Tartary ice floe, and a number in incidents happen in quick succession. Shiraishi is relieved to find Sugimoto still alive, but is surprised to learn from him that Ogata shot Sugimoto and Wilk (Nopperabo). While searching for firewood, Ogata presses Asirpa to tell him what she remembered of her father's secret code and tells her that Kiroranke arranged the murder of Nopperabo. Tsukishima finds Svetlana freezing on the ice, but she would rather die there than return to her boring family life. Koito and Tanigaki are attacked by two escaped Aka prisoners but manage to kill them. Kiroranke comes across Tanigaki and attempts to kill him with his bare hands, but Tanigaki stabs him in the chest. Ogata does what he can to gain Asirpa's trust but she is still suspicious of him. She draws her bow but cannot shoot him. As Ogata prepares to shoot her, Sugimoto calls from a distance and Asirpa's arrow flies into Ogata's eye. Sugimoto tries to stop Ogata dying which would make Asirpa a killer, and Sugimoto and Asirpa are tearfully reunited. Koito follows Kiroranke, and after dodging a booby trap, he savagely attacks the Ainu revolutionary.
36	12	"To Live"; Transliteration: "Ikiru" (Japanese: 生きる)	Yutaka Hirata	Noboru Takagi	Namimi Sanjo	December 21, 2020
Kiroranke gains the upper hand in his fight with Koito, but he is shot by Tanigaki. However, before Tanigaki can kill Kiroranke, Asirpa arrives and demands to know if he was responsible for her father's death. Unfortunately, Kiroranke dies before answering her. As Sugimoto's group cover Kiroranke's body in ice, Sugimoto tells Asirpa that before her father died, Wilk said that he did not kill the Ainu transporting the gold. Gansoku catches up with them as they head back to the Nivkh village near Ako with Svetlana, while Sofia follows at a distance. Svetlana promises to tell her parents she is still alive and travels on to the Russian mainland with Gansoku where they have an adventurous future together. Sugimoto's group persuades a Russian doctor to treat Tsukishima and save Ogata at his small hospital, but when Ogata recovers consciousness he escapes. Sugimoto is secretly pleased as this prevents Asirpa from becoming a murderer, however Sugimoto swears to eventually find and kill the sniper himself. Later, Sugimoto and Asirpa reaffirm their partnership to find the gold, then head off to continue their quest with the rest of the group; Koito, Tanigaki, Tsukishima, Shiraishi, Cikapasi and Enonoka.

== Home media release ==
=== Japanese ===
NBCUniversal Entertainment Japan (Japan – Region 2/A)
Volume	Episodes	Release date	Ref.
7	25–28	January 29, 2021	
8	29–32	February 26, 2021	
9	33–36	March 26, 2021	
