= Golden Kamuy season 5 =

Season of television series

Golden Kamuy
- Season 5
- Cover of the thirteenth home media volume as released by NBCUniversal Entertainment Japan
- No. of episodes: 13

Release
- Original network: Tokyo MX
- Original release: January 20 – March 31, 2026

Season chronology
- ← Previous; Season 4

The fifth season of the Golden Kamuy anime television series is based on Satoru Noda's manga series of the same name and adapts from the 25th volume to the 30th volume. In June 2022, it was announced that the anime series would receive a fifth season. Brain's Base produced the season, continuing from season 4. The season aired from January 5, 2026, to March 30, 2026.

The opening theme is "Kogane no Kanata" (黄金の彼方; lit. 'Beyond the Gold'), performed by Awich and ALI (credited as Awich × ALI), while the ending theme is "The Ballad" by Ken Yokoyama.

== Episodes ==
No. overall	No. in season	Title (Note: English translated titles are taken from IMDb.)	Directed by	Written by	Storyboarded by	Original release date
50	1	"Town of Reunions"; Transliteration: "Saikai no Machi" (再会の街)	Shizutaka Sugahara	Noboru Takagi	Keiji Gotō	January 5, 2026
Asirpa convinces Sugimoto's group and Hijikata's group to join forces as a better alternative than to let Tsurumi find the gold because she believes that Hijikata wants the best for the Ainu people. She examines all the skins and copies that they have, but finds that some do not follow the pattern and suspects that fakes have been mixed in by Tsurumi to make decoding their message difficult.
51	2	"Send up the Fireworks"; Transliteration: "Uchiage Hanabi" (打ち上げ花火)	Shizutaka Sugahara	Aya Yoshinaga	Kazuhiko Shibuya	January 12, 2026
The combined groups searching for the Ainu gold prepare to catch the Jack the Ripper copycat serial killer so they can obtain his tattoo before Tsurumi arrives. However, Ogata, Usami and others from the 7th Division are already in the town. Meanwhile, the reporter Ishikawa believes he has deduced where the killer will strike next, based on the sequence of the locations of the original Jack the Ripper murders—at the Sapporo Beer factory. Hijikata plans a trap for the serial killer, using members of the group acting as decoys. There is confusion when Usami stumbles into the carefully laid trap, and the killer is revealed to be the Westerner known as Michael Ostrong. He escapes into the brewery after being shot and wounded by Hijikata. Everyone heads into the brewery, including members of the 7th Division, setting off a sequence of violent clashes. Meanwhile, Mokutarou Kikuta of the 7th Division tells Asirpa that Tsurumi knows what happened to her father.
52	3	"Tokushirou-san's Number One"; Transliteration: "Atsushishirō-san no Ichiban" (篤四郎さんの一番)	Shizutaka Sugahara	Daishirō Tanimura	Risako Yoshida	January 19, 2026
As the battle in the Sapporo brewery continues, Ostrong sets packing straw alight as a distraction and then catches Asirpa. Ostrong believes in the Ainu tales of women having virgin births, refusing to believe he was born of a union between a man and woman. Asirpa strikes him, but as he is about to retaliate, Sugimoto arrives and brutally assaults him before pushing him out of a window to his death. Meanwhile, Usami savagely beats Ogata, who manages to load a bullet and shoot Usami before he can stab him. Usami tries to ride off, but Ogata shoots him again and he dies in the arms of Tsurumi, who has just arrived with the 7th Division. The tattooed madman Ueiji Keiji climbs to the top of the factory chimney, threatening to kill himself and deny his skin to the collectors, but they are unconcerned because they no longer believe all 24 skins are necessary. Ueiji Keiji falls to his death. Sugimoto and Asirpa become trapped inside the burning factory and encounter Kadokura, who bears the unfinished 24th tattoo on his back.
53	4	"Making a Homeland"; Transliteration: "Furusato o Tsukuru" (故郷を作る)	Shizutaka Sugahara	Shingo Irie	Keiji Gotō	January 26, 2026
Botaro offers to enter the factory to save Sugimoto and Asirpa, but instead seizes Asirpa and the tattooed skins before escaping the building. He tells Asirpa that he plans to use the gold to create a homeland of his own. However, he encounters Lieutenant Kioto of the 7th Division and flees back into the smoke-filled building, leaving Asirpa to be captured by Lieutenant Tsurumi. Botaro commandeers a Sapporo motor vehicle and pursues Tsurumi's group with Shiraishi and Sugimoto. He is ultimately shot dead while sacrificing himself to save Shiraishi as Sugimoto desperately but unsuccessfully attempts to rescue Asirpa from Tsurumi's vehicle.
54	5	"Pinky Bone"; Transliteration: "Koyubi no Hone" (小指の骨)	Shizutaka Sugahara	Aya Yoshinaga	Keiji Gotō	February 2, 2026
Sofia, the Russian woman from the Otaru hospital, tries to rescue Asirpa, but she fails and is also captured by Tsurumi. He takes them alone into an old church, however Hajime Tsukishima and Otonoshin Koito become suspicious of Tsurumi's motives and listen outside the door. Tsurumi tells Asirpa and Sofia of years earlier in Vladivostok, when he was known as Hasegawa the photographer, and whose wife Fina and daughter Olga were killed by Sofia "Golden Hand"'s revolutionaries—he still keeps their "pinky" bones as mementos of them. Fifty years earlier, the Ainu gathered gold to buy arms from the Russians to start a rebellion against the Japanese on Karafuto, but the ship carrying the weapons sank. Years later, Wilk came looking for the gold, marrying an Ainu woman to blend in, and then had a daughter, Asirpa. The Ainu search party of Wilk, Siromakur, Mesira, Sakuta, Irenka, Ratci and Oskeporo learned of the location of the gold from an old man, Kimuspu. Wilk changed the plan to create an independent state for the Ainu on Hokkaido instead of recapturing Karafuto for the Ainu minorities, going against his friend Kiroranke's wishes.
55	6	"The Cause of Everything"; Transliteration: "Subete no Genkyō" (全ての元凶)	Shizutaka Sugahara	Daishirō Tanimura	Keiji Gotō	February 9, 2026
Siromakur Ariki (Rikimatsu Ariko's father) tells Tsurumi how there was friction among the Ainu when some wanted to force Kimuspu into revealing the location of the gold, but Wilk kept them focused. To create disharmony, Tsurumi told Siromakur that Wilk was planning to betray the Ainu, causing them to fight among themselves and kill each other, including Kimuspu. However, Wilk survived and removed the faces and scalps of the other seven, including his own, and switched them around to make it appear that he was among the dead. Tsurumi suspected what Wilk had done and tracked him down to Lake Shikotsu, which was near a prison illegally using prisoners for labor and run by Shirosuke Inudou. Wilk told Inudou of the seven dead Ainu and the gold in exchange for protection, then later moved to Abashiri Prison. Tsurumi concludes his story with the belief that it was Wilk who shot his wife and daughter, based on the bullet lodged in Fina's body, then dons Wilk's death mask and laughs maniacally.
56	7	"Ipopte"; Transliteration: "Ipopte" (イポㇷ゚テ)	Shizutaka Sugahara	Daishirō Tanimura	Masaharu Okuwaki	February 16, 2026
In an effort to force Asirpa to reveal her father's code, Tsurumi begins to choke Sofia with Wilk's death mask, and fluid begins to leak down his face from beneath the plate on his head. Asirpa reveals that her only clue is her father's Ainu name, Horkew Oskoni, just as Rikimatsu (whose Ainu name was Ipopte) enters the room. Tsurumi throws his tattooed skins across the floor and begins searching for that name while Rikimatsu tells him he knows the location of Hijikata's hideout while cutting Asirpa's ropes. A gunfight breaks out between Ipopte and the 7th Division, and although he manages to get Asirpa to Sugimoto's vehicle, he is wounded and then shot by his friend in the 7th Division, Kikuta. As the rescue party flees, Asirpa sees Ushiyama and tells him to tell Hijikata that she knows how to identify the fake tattoos; meanwhile Tsukishima pursues them on foot. Kikuta takes the wounded Ipopte to a doctor. At Hijikata's camp, Asirpa explains how to identify the fake skins by the tanning process and that the minted gold coins have a similar design. Using that, along with Burato's clue about the first location of the hidden gold, the group boards a train for their destination.
57	8	"Tokyo Love Story"; Transliteration: "Tōkyō Ai Monogatari" (東京愛物語)	Shizutaka Sugahara	Shingo Irie	Masaki Ōzora	February 23, 2026
While dozing off on the train, Sugimoto recalls how he met Kikuta and became the "Immortal" Sugimoto. After seeing an impoverished youth fighting with a group of army officer cadets, Kikuta recruits him to impersonate Yuusaku Hanazawa, the son of 7th Division Commander Hanazawa, who is betrothed to Kaneko Kaeko. The Commander wants his son to become a flag bearer, a highly dangerous position, but his wife arranges the engagement so he will lose his virginity and become ineligible. After discovering her plan, the Commander asks Kikuta to find a substitute. Meanwhile, Army 1st Division Commander General Okuda Hidenobu tasks Tsurumi with finding the rumored Ainu gold for the central government and informs him of the Hanazawa family situation. Just as Sugimoto is about to be seduced by Kaneko, Tsurumi bursts in to stop it.
58	9	"Starting Gun of Resolve"; Transliteration: "Ketsui no Gōhō" (決意の号砲)	Hiroshi Ishiodori	Noboru Takagi	Masaki Ōzora	March 2, 2026
As Sugimoto fights off Tsurumi and his men, Kikuta arrives and helps Sugimoto escape, although Tsurumi shoots and wounds him. Kaneko Kaeko never marries but becomes a financial titan in her own right. Later, General Okuda Hidenobu assigns Kikuta to the 7th Division to keep an eye on Tsurumi and assigns Hyakunosuke Ogata independently to the same task. Back in the present, Tsurumi claims to have solved the riddle of the gold's location and promptly shoots Kikuta, revealing that he knew the officer was a spy. Meanwhile, as their train arrives at Hakodate, Asirpa solves the puzzle of the tattooed skins and identifies the location of the gold as the nearby star-shaped Fort Goryōkaku. When Hijikata's group arrives at the fort, they are attacked by a few 7th Division soldiers sent on ahead by Tsurumi, who has also solved the puzzle. Hijikata tells Sugimoto that he has arranged for Sofia and her Yulbars revolutionaries to support them.
59	10	"Our Kamuy"; Transliteration: "Watashitachi no Kamui" (私たちのカムイ)	Shizutaka Sugahara	Noboru Takagi	Masaki Ōzora	March 9, 2026
Hijikata prepares to defend Fort Goryōkaku against the 7th Division as Sofia arrives with her revolutionaries. As they search the storerooms for the gold, Asirpa finds a box buried underground, but instead of gold it contains only a book. Nagakura explains that the book contains a list of deeds to land in Hokkaido that had been purchased by the Ainu with half of the gold as part of a treaty between the Ainu and the Ezo Republic. This means that the remaining half of the gold is still hidden. At that moment, battleships requested by Tsurumi drop anchor in the harbor and begin bombarding the fort. Meanwhile, Nagakura leaves the fort to tell Tsurumi that the gold is not there, hoping to convince him to withdraw. Tsurumi refuses to believe him, but Nagakura escapes before Tsurumi can kill him. Hijikata's group continues digging until they uncover a hidden well containing bags of Ainu gold dust.
60	11	"The Battle of Goryōkaku"; Transliteration: "Goryōkaku Kōi-sen" (五稜郭攻囲戦)	Shizutaka Sugahara	Noboru Takagi	Masaki Ōzora	March 16, 2026
Nagakura explains to Hijikata's group that in 1870, the Ainu secretly negotiated with Enomoto Takeaki to purchase land in Hokkaido. The negotiations and transfer of the gold payment to the Ezo Republic took place at the then-abandoned Fort Goryōkaku. Around that time, a wounded Hijikata was taken in and cared for by the Ainu. As government forces prepared to seize the fort, the Ainu decided to hide both the deed book and the remaining gold within its grounds. Back in the present, the fort comes under attack from the battleships, which bombard its elevated defenses. Tsurumi explains that the frontier of Manchuria is on the verge of collapse and believes Russia will soon threaten both Manchuria and Hokkaido. He argues that military rule must be restored and financed with the Ainu gold, proposing the cultivation of opium poppies to fund expansion. Tsurumi launches his assault on the fort but is met with fierce resistance from Sofia's Yulbars entrenched around the defenses. Meanwhile, Nagakura leads three men to a shrine on Mount Hakodate to retrieve the Shinsengumi's hidden cannon, Kaitenmaru. They disable three of the four battleships before enemy fire strikes their position.
61	12	"Bushido"; Transliteration: "Bushidō" (武士道)	Shizutaka Sugahara	Daishirō Tanimura	Kazuhiko Shibuya	March 23, 2026
Tsurumi's forces fight their way inside the walls of Goryōkaku with both sides suffering heavy casualties. Nagakura leaves his three wounded companions on Mount Hakodate and returns to join Hijikata. Kōhei attacks Sugimoto, leading to a brutal hand-to-hand struggle. Kōhei pulls out a grenade, but Sugimoto shoves him into a well where the grenade explodes, killing him. As the 7th Division gradually gains the upper hand, Shiraishi attempts to help Asirpa escape, but they are surrounded. Asirpa nearly falls into enemy hands before Sugimoto rescues her on horseback. Sugimoto and Shiraishi ride toward the fort's northern exit in an attempt to break through.
62	13	"Daughter of Wilk"; Transliteration: "Uiruku no Musume" (ウイルクの娘)	Shizutaka Sugahara	Aya Yoshinaga	Risako Yoshida	March 30, 2026
Sofia finds herself alone, with all of her Yulbars dead, but refuses to flee with Sugimoto and Shiraishi. Instead, she stays behind to delay their pursuers and help save Asirpa. Sofia and Tsurumi confront one another, and after she momentarily hesitates upon recognizing him from the past, he shoots her dead. Sugimoto's horse is shot from under him, but Asirpa is saved from falling into the moat by Tanigaki, who has arrived after hearing about the fighting at Goryōkaku. Tanigaki escapes with Asirpa and Sugimoto while Tsurumi and several of his key men pursue them. Hidden in a tree, Ogata realizes the Russian sniper may still be stalking him. He fires at the sniper's presumed position and wounds him, but the sniper returns fire, striking Ogata in the leg. Meanwhile, Tanigaki and Sugimoto catch up with Hijikata and Ushiyama, who have also escaped the fort. Together, they board a train bound for Hakodate, only to discover that it is filled with 7th Division reinforcements. While Hijikata, Ushiyama, and Sugimoto battle through the soldiers, Ogata reaches the locomotive and forces the crew off the train, sending it hurtling toward Hakodate Station at full speed.

== Home media release ==
=== Japanese ===
NBCUniversal Entertainment Japan (Japan – Region 2/A)
Volume	Episodes	Release date	Ref.
13	50–52	April 29, 2026	
14	53–55	May 27, 2026	
15	56–59	June 24, 2026	
16	60–62	July 29, 2026	
