= Golden Kamuy season 4 =

Season of television series

Golden Kamuy
- Season 4
- Cover of the tenth home media volume as released by NBCUniversal Entertainment Japan
- No. of episodes: 13

Release
- Original network: Tokyo MX
- Original release: October 3, 2022 – June 26, 2023

Season chronology
- ← Previous; Season 3 Next → Season 5

The fourth season of the Golden Kamuy anime television series is based on Satoru Noda's manga series of the same name and adapts from the 21st volume to the beginning of the 25th volume (chapters 171–172; 201–244). In December 2021, it was announced that the anime series would receive a fourth season. Brain's Base produced the season, replacing Geno Studio. Shizutaka Sugahara replaced Hitoshi Nanba as chief series director, while Takumi Yamakawa replaced Kenichi Ōnuki as character designer. Noboru Takagi returned to write the scripts. The season aired from October 3, 2022, to June 26, 2023.

The opening theme is "Never Say Goodbye", performed by ALI featuring Mummy-D, while the ending theme is "Subete ga Soko ni Arimasu You Ni", which is performed by The Spellbound. On November 7, 2022, it was announced that the season's broadcast from episode 7 and beyond would be postponed following the unexpected death of a main production staff member. The season restarted broadcasting from the first episode on April 3, 2023, with the seventh episode airing on May 15.

== Episodes ==
No. overall	No. in season	Title (Note: English translated titles are taken from Crunchyroll.)	Directed by	Written by	Storyboarded by	Original release date
37	1	"Rushin' Outta Russia"; Transliteration: "Aba yo Roshia" (Japanese: あばよロシア)	Shizutaka Sugihara	Noboru Takagi	Minoru Ohara	October 3, 2022
Sugimoto's party leave the Nivkh village in Russia on dog sleds, crossing back into Japanese territory. They arrive in the coastal town of Shisuka where they are observed by an unknown person. Sugimoto sends a telegram to Lt. Tsurumi announcing that they are heading towards Toyohara. Suddenly, Shiraishi is shot in the leg by a sniper who then keeps the group pinned down. Sugimoto returns from shopping for supplies and attacks the sniper from a different direction. Sugimoto discovers that he is the Russian sniper seeking revenge on Ogata for killing his comrades. The Russian then follows the group at a distance and they arrive at Lake Akan. Meanwhile, the former Head Jailer Kadokura and Kirawus, search for Ushiyama and Hijikata. They question a local Ainu boy who tells them he saw the men they are seeking with another stranger. After finding a silkworm cocoon, Kadokura deduces that their target, the tattooed escapee Sekiya Waichiro, had used his knowledge of toxins to immobilize them. Meanwhile, a disguised Sekiya offers Kirawus some fish laced with lethal amounts of tetrodotoxin, but Kadokura saves them when he accidentally drops the fish into an ice hole, blaming his bad luck.
38	2	"Cocoon"; Transliteration: "Mayu" (Japanese: 繭)	Tomio Yamauchi	Noboru Takagi	Minoru Ohara	October 10, 2022
Ushiyama regains some level of consciousness while buried in a coffin, but is still effected by Sekiya's combined fugu and datura poisons. He breaks out, and outdoors he rescues Chiyotarou, the Ainu skating boy of a wealthy family who had been tied to a tree by bullies. Meanwhile, Sekiya sends Hijikata's katana to Kadokura with a provocative message stating that he has kidnapped Hijikata who is still in a coma caused by fugu poison. Kadokura and Kirawus hatch a plan to exchange some tattooed skins with Sekiya for Hijikata and capture him during the exchange in the center of an iced-covered river. However, the plan is foiled when Ushiyama bursts through the ice after earlier falling into the water. Together they track down Sekiya, but he proposes a type of Russian roulette to Kadokura, played with poison-filled silkworm cocoons in exchange for Hijikata. Kadokura's bad lack continues when he chooses a cocoon containing wolfsbane which quickly takes effect, but he swallows two more cocoons to reduce his suffering. When Sekiya digs up Hijikata, the old man jumps up and attacks him, inflicting a fatal injury. Kadokura recovers because two subsequent doses he swallowed consisted of fugo which cancelled out the wolfsbane. Sekiya dies from his injury enabling Hijikata and Kadokura to collect his tattooed skin.
39	3	"The Smell of Sulfur"; Transliteration: "Iō no Nioi" (Japanese: 硫黄のにおい)	Tomio Yamauchi	Noboru Takagi	Minoru Ohara	October 17, 2022
While Privates Nikaido and Usami of the 7th Division are recuperating at the Noboribetsu Hell Valley hot springs they meet Warrant Officer Kikuta. He introduces them to Private Ariko, an Ainu, who tells of recently seeing a stranger who appears to be wearing a strangely marked coat higher up the mountain. Kikuta asks Nikaido about the tattoos on the escaped Abashiri prisoners, suspecting the stranger may be one of them. Meanwhile at another sulfurous hot spring up in the hills, escapee Anji Toni and his associates plot to get rid of the suspicious Kikuta and Ariko. However Kikuta finds them first, prepared for fighting in the darkness after wearing an eyepatch since sunset to increase his night vision in that eye. He and Ariko are joined by Nikaido and Usami who are also seeking the tattooed escapee. After a violent encounter, they follow Toni into an abandoned mine, where both Usami and Toni are wounded in a gunfight. Toni exits the mine but is followed by Ariko who uses gunshots to cause an avalanche which kills Toni. Ariko strips of Toni's skin and is later joined by Kikuta, planning to take it to Tsurumi together.
40	4	"Spoiled Rich Kid"; Transliteration: "Bonbon" (Japanese: ボンボン)	Takafumi Fujii	Aya Yoshinaga	Minoru Ohara	October 24, 2022
In a flashback to Kagoshima many years earlier, the young Otonoshin Koito, a naval cadet and second son of the wealthy Naval commander Heiji Koito, crashes into Tsurumi with his new motorized tricycle. Tsurumi chases Koito and teaches the young man a lesson in humility. Koito then reveals the remorse he feels about his older brother's death during the Sino-Japanese War and they strike up a friendship. Later, the Koito family move to Hakodate where Koito is kidnapped and coincidentally the soldier brought in to rescue him is Tsurumi. Tsurumi deduces that Koito was captured by Russians who intend to immobilize the Japanese Oominato Torpedo Group and Fort Hakodate. After locating the kidnappers at the abandoned army base of Goryoukaku some kilometers away, Commander Heiji and Tsurumi race there and manage to free him, with Tsurumi killing his captors. Koito attends the army officer's school with his father's blessing, and after graduation he joins Tsurumi in 7th Division. Koito briefly encounters Hyakunosuke Ogata who refers to him as a "barchonok", Russian for a spoiled rich kid.
41	5	"Cinematograph"; Transliteration: "Shinematogurafu" (Japanese: シネマトグラフ)	Tomio Yamauchi	Shingo Irie	Masahiko Murata	October 31, 2022
In Toyohara, Sugimoto receives word by telegram that Tsurumi is on his way to Karafuto via Noboribetsu and is planning to meet them on Oodomari in two weeks. While Sugimoto and Asirpa out hunting, they are watched by Tsukishima accompanied by a Russian. Meanwhile, a cinematographer Katsuro Inaba and his operator Gariel, are filming Karafuto Ainu for Lumière when they see Asirpa create a ritual fire without matches and he asks to film it. Suddenly, Inaba ia attacked by the wolverine that Asirpa is tracking. Sugimoto and Asirpa manage to kill it and its mate while Gariel films the event. Later, while watching some of Inaba's film footage, Asirpa is inspired to act out some traditional Ainu stories for posterity, becoming both writer and director with Sugimoto's group acting out the character roles. During the screening of the film, Katsuro shows footage he filmed over 10 years earlier in Otaru, and Asirpa sees her father Wilk and then her mother for the first time, but the arc lamp ignites the nitrate film, consuming it in flames. Asirpa realizes that nothing lasts forever, and confronts Sugimoto about what the future holds for her and the Ainu culture. Sugimoto reveals to her that, before he died, her father told him that he raised Asirpa to be someone who could lead the Ainu. He then curses Wilk and Kiroranke for burdening Asirpa with that huge responsibility and suggests that she abandon the race for the gold.
42	6	"Sweet Lies"; Transliteration: "Amai Uso" (Japanese: 甘い嘘)	Takeyuki Sadohara	Daishiro Tanimura	Masahiko Murata	November 7, 2022
Tsurumi realizes that Anji Toni was pretending to be a masseur while spying on their movements. Tsurumi suspects that Ariko is working for Hijikata as the skin he returned with was not Toni's, but that of Sekiya, because he already knew what was on Toni's tattoo. Tsurumi pressures Ariko into working for him as a double-agent, and after beating him up sends him off with all the fake skins made by Yasaku Edogai to give to Hijikata. Ariko arrives with the skins, but Hijikata suspects they are fakes and that Ariko is being used by Tsurumi. Sugimoto's group leaves their dog sled and Cikapasi with Enonoka and Henke, and continue on to Oodomari. Based on what Ogata told him, Koito suspects that Tsurumi was involved in the suicide death of General Hanazawa Koujirou, former commander of the 7th Division, to facilitate construction of the Manchurian Railway which helped keep Manchuria under Japanese control. He questions Tsukishima about this, but Tsukishima just explains that Tsurumi is a ruthless man who will use any means, from murder to sweet lies, to achieve his objectives and he warns Koito to keep his concerns to himself. This makes Koito even more enamored of Tsurumi. Elsewhere, after a night out, a drunken Shiraishi tells Sugimoto that Asirpa has grown while in Karafuto and is no longer a little girl, and she may want to lead the Ainu.
43	7	"Fleeing Karafuto"; Transliteration: "Karafuto Dasshutsu" (Japanese: 樺太脱出)	Tomio Yamauchi	Noboru Takagi	Masahiko Murata	May 15, 2023
Tsurumi's destroyer reaches the port of Karafuto where he approaches Asirpa's group and offers to protect her. He proposes to send Sugimoto and Shiraishi on the morning ferry to Wakkanai but Asirpa mistrusts his motives. Taking the initiative, Asirpa fires a volley of arrows into the air, causing everyone to scatter and enabling her to flee with Sugimoto. They are caught and come under fire but as Tsurumi's men surround them, Sugimoto lashes out, wounding them and escaping again. With the aid of the unknown "Mister Hood", Asirpa, the wounded Sugimoto and Shiraishi reach the ferry before it sails, leaving Tanigaki and Tsurumi behind with his men. A short while later, Tsurumi's destroyer steams after the ferry and take control. However, Asirpa, Sugimoto, Shiraishi and Mister Hood had descended onto an ice floe and escaped by using white sheets to conceal their movements. A short while later, local fishermen take them aboard their small boat and head back towards Hokkaido, while the disguised Ogata boards the ferry back to Hokkaido.
44	8	"Brown Bear Man"; Transliteration: "Higuma Otoko" (Japanese: ヒグマ男)	Seiya Ishida	Shingo Irie	Isamu Imakake	May 22, 2023
Asirpa's group relax with the local Ainu and plan to get the tattoed skins while Hijikata and Tsurumi are preoccupied with fighting each other. While talking, they learn that there is a reward for catching a legendary wankamuy, a bear that has killed someone. While out hunting, Sugimoto and Asirpa save the man called Heita who then tells them the best method to search for gold, but also that he has made more money from panning for "white", specks of platinum worth as much as gold. When Asirpa sees that he has a carved Ainu tobacco case with a bear motif Heita slowly reveals that he panned for gold with the Ainu and that he became both obsessed and terrified by the wankamuy legend. He wore a bear skin when he murdered members of his family and ended up in prison where he was tattooed. When Asirpa and Sugimoto discover that he has a bear skin, he attacks them with uncontrolled ferocity, and is only stopped when he is accidentally shot dead by the poisoned arrow from a deer trap.
45	9	"Partner in Crime"; Transliteration: "Kyōhan-sha" (Japanese: 共犯者)	Takeyuki Sadohara	Aya Yoshinaga	Masayuki Miyaji	May 29, 2023
Genjiro Tanigaki attempts to quit, but Tsurumi reveals that Inkarmat is pregnant with Tanigaki's child and instead sends him on a mission to get rid of Sugimoto. As Asirpa's group dry Heita's tattooed skin, they examine his labelled gold samples and Shiraishi suggests that if the sample from "Boutarou the Pirate" was retrieved from Lake Shikotsu where Noppera-bo lost some when his boat capsized, it may provide a clue to the gold's location. Elsewhere, Ogata rejoins Hijikata's group and reveals that Sofia Goldenhand is after Asirpa whom he suspects has discovered the key to unlocking the code on the skins. In Sapporo, Ishikawa Takuboku writes articles for the local newspapers about a series of brutal killings of prostitutes. This news causes Hijikata to suspect the killer is another escaped convict while Tsurumi come to the same conclusion. Tsurumi sends Warrant Officer Kikuta to investigate along with Private Usami. A flashback to many years earlier shows how Usami became Tsurumi's acolyte - he killed another student in a fit of jealousy and Tsurumi helped cover it up.
46	10	"Perfect Mother"; Transliteration: "Kanpekina Haha" (Japanese: 完璧な母)	Shizutaka Sugahara	Daishiro Tanimura	Hiroshi Ishidori	June 5, 2023
Tanigaki abandons his mission to kill Sugimoto and capture Asirpa. Instead he visits the heavily pregnant Inkarmat, planning to escape with her. He is caught by Tsukishima but Doctor Ienaga injects him with a sedative so that they can escape, however Tsukishima shoots her before he collapses. Koito allows the couple to escape but Tsukishima recovers enough to fire a shot, hitting Tanigaki as he rides off with Inkarmat. They reach Huci's cottage on foot, but Tsukishima catches up with them, followed by Koito, who stops Tsukishima from killing Tanigaki. Inkarmat starts giving birth so everything is paused so that Huci can deliver the baby. A baby girl is born, and Koito convinces Tsukishima to let the couple leave with the baby. He convinces Tsukishima of his loyalty to Tsurumi even though he still does not know what his commander's ultimate objective is.
47	11	"Steamship"; Transliteration: "Jōki-sen" (Japanese: 蒸気船)	Takafumi Fujii	Noboru Takagi	Hiroshi Ishidori	June 12, 2023
Asirpa gets information from a local man that a strange tattooed peddler was seen at the Utashinai coal mines, selling candy, but after investigating him and another stranger, they decide leave by paddle boat for Sapporo. The boat is attacked and captured by a former prisoner, Fusataro Osawa known as Botaro the pirate, who is also searching for the Ainu gold. He and Sugimoto fight to a standstill while Mister Hood's trailing boat carrying the horses becomes separated. Botaro explains how Wakayama, an escaped convict and former yakuza boss, said the skins were worthless and did not bother to copy or take Botaro's skin. As the boat reaches Ebetsu, Botaro decides to just take the money from the postman's registered mail, but he is taken aback when he sees Heita's carved Ainu tobacco case with the bear motif in Asirpa's belongings.
48	12	"Discharge"; Transliteration: "Hassha" (Japanese: 発射)	Takeyuki Sadohara	Shingo Irie	Masayuki Miyaji	June 19, 2023
After seeing the contents of Heita's tobacco case, Botaro the Pirate realizes that Sugimoto is also after the Ainu gold. During a struggle they are both thrown overboard and Botaro tries to drown Sugimoto, but he breaks free and captures Botaro. Sugimoto then declares that they will work together, sharing information to gain an advantage over Tsurumi and Hijikata's groups. In Sapporo, Usami uses an unconventional method to track the prostitute killer, but he escapes from Usami and Kikuta and kills another two women that night. Kikuta meets Rikimatsu Ariko, now mistrusted by both Tsurumi and Hijikata, and asks him to work for the government to help Tsurumi find the gold before disposing of him. Ishikawa Takuboku reports to Hijikata the Sapporo killer is following exactly the pattern as the notorious Jack the Ripper indicating that he intends to disappear after the fifth murder which will occur in 40 days time. Meanwhile, a newspaper article about children disappearing, points to the escaped prisoner Keiji Ueji heading towards Sapporo. His description matches the candy seller Asirpa saw near the Utashinai coal mines. All three groups begin to converge on Sapporo.
49	13	"The Vanished Kamuy"; Transliteration: "Kieta Kamui" (Japanese: 消えたカムイ)	Takafumi Fujii	Noboru Takagi	Masayuki Miyaji	June 26, 2023
Usami tells Kikuta that Ogata killed his half-brother, Lieutenant Yuusaku Hanazawa, during the Battle of Hill 203 to determine if his father, General Hanazawa, really loved him (see Episode 30). Usami then reminisces about how he and Ogata were both Tsurumi's pawns, with Ogata killing his father for Tsurumi, but this just made Usami more jealous of Ogata's closeness to Tsurumi. Meanwhile, Asirpa speculates that the Ainu name that her mother gave to her father, Aca, is somehow embedded in the code, but fears that if she finds the gold, Sugimoto will leave her. Suddenly, they are caught in a tree-felling operation by the local Ainu and are trapped beneath a fallen tree prompting them both to think about their future. Botaro has deduced that Asirpa is Noppera-bo's daughter and so Shiraishi tells him to show her the gold coin he found in Lake Shikotsu with tattoo-like Ainu markings. After examining it, Asirpa becomes convinced that her father did not kill the other Ainu and clarifies what she must do for the Ainu people.

== Home media release ==
=== Japanese ===
NBCUniversal Entertainment Japan (Japan – Region 2/A)
Volume	Episodes	Release date	Ref.
10	37–40	July 26, 2023	
11	41–44	August 30, 2023	
12	45–49	September 27, 2023	
