= Golden Kamuy season 1 =

Season of television series

Golden Kamuy
- Season 1
- Cover of the first home media volume as released by NBCUniversal Entertainment Japan
- No. of episodes: 12

Release
- Original network: Tokyo MX
- Original release: April 9 – June 25, 2018

Season chronology
- Next → Season 2

The first season of the Golden Kamuy anime television series is based on Satoru Noda's manga series of the same name and adapts from the 1st volume to the 7th (chapters 1–62). The anime was announced in July 2017 in Weekly Young Jump. The series was directed by Hitoshi Nanba and written by Noboru Takagi, with music by Kenichiro Suehiro, art direction by Atsushi Morikawa, and CG direction by Yuuko Okumura and Yasutaka Hamada. Kenichi Ohnuki is adapting the character designs for animation, while Koji Watanabe designs firearms, Shinya Anasuma designs the props, and Ryō Sumiyoshi designs the animals. Like with the manga, Hiroshi Nakagawa, an Ainu language linguist from Chiba University, works on the anime as an Ainu language supervisor. The series aired from April 9 to June 25, 2018, on Tokyo MX, ytv, STV, and BS11, and ran for 12 episodes. The series' opening theme is "Winding Road" performed by Man with a Mission while the ending theme is "Hibana" performed by The Sixth Lie.

The series is simulcast on Crunchyroll, and an English dub started streaming on Funimation starting on April 30, 2018. The series was also released across three DVD and Blu-ray volumes in Japan, starting in July 2018; they had originally been planned to release starting in June, but were delayed one month to allow for improvements to the footage compared to the TV broadcast version. The Japanese home video volumes would include the Golden Dōga Gekijō shorts, including four episodes that are exclusive to the first volume.

== Episodes ==
No. overall	No. in season	Title (Note: English translated titles are taken from Crunchyroll.)	Directed by	Written by	Storyboarded by	Original release date
1	1	"Wenkamuy"; Transliteration: "Wenkamui" (Japanese: ウェンカムイ)	Takahiro Kawakoshi	Noboru Takagi	Namimi Sanjo	April 9, 2018
Saichi "Immortal" Sugimoto, a Russo-Japanese War veteran, pans for gold in Hokkaido to provide for the widow of his dead comrade Toraji. His acquaintance Gotō drunkenly tells him the story of Nopperabo, a man who killed a group of Ainu and stole their trove of gold, hiding its location in a map tattooed across twenty-four escaped prisoners. Sugimoto doubts the story, until a sober Gotō attempts to kill him. In the ensuing fight, Gotō is killed by a bear, and Sugimoto sees Gotō has tattoos like those described in the story. Asirpa, an Ainu girl, and Retar, a Hokkaido wolf, save Sugimoto. Sugimoto tells her the story, and Asirpa reveals that her father was among the Ainu people killed. Sugimoto and Asirpa agree to join forces to find the gold.
2	2	"Nopperabo"; Transliteration: "Nopperabō" (Japanese: のっぺら坊)	Shigeki Awai	Noboru Takagi	Namimi Sanjo	April 16, 2018
Sugimoto and Asirpa search the nearby city of Otaru for tattooed prisoners, capturing one when he follows them back into the woods. While Asirpa is copying his tattoo, he reveals that someone has been killing the prisoners, and is shot from a distance. Sugimoto fights the shooter – Hyakunosuke Ogata, a private in the Japanese Army's 7th Division – who falls into a river and is recovered by the 7th. Sugimoto and Asirpa capture a second prisoner, Shiraishi Yoshitake, a master escape artist who cuts off his bonds. Sugimoto gives chase but they fall into a freezing river, and agree to work together to avoid hypothermia. Yoshitake reveals that the leader of the prisoners is Hijikata Toshizō.
3	3	"Kamuy Mosir"; Transliteration: "Kamui Moshiri" (Japanese: カムイモシㇼ)	Shigeru Fukase	Noboru Takagi	Soji Ninomiya	April 23, 2018
Sugimoto and Asirpa are pursued by soldiers from the 7th Division. Private Genjirō Tanigaki finds Asirpa, but is fought off by Retar. Sugimoto evades capture after diving into a bear cave, whose occupant charges and kills the soldiers before succumbing to its wounds. Sugimoto and Asirpa take a baby bear found in the cave to Asirpa's village, and visit Asirpa's grandmother ("Huci"). Lieutenant Tokushirou Tsurumi, the leader of the 7th, mounts a search effort for the missing soldiers. Meanwhile, at a brothel in Otaru, Hijikata ambushes the tattooed prisoner Ushiyama Tatsuma, and offers to work with him to collect the tattooed skins.
4	4	"Grim Reaper"; Transliteration: "Shinigami" (Japanese: 死神)	Yūsuke Onoda	Shingo Irie	Miyana Okita	April 30, 2018
Sugimoto leaves the village and returns to Otaru alone, where he learns of the incident with Ushiyama. He is captured by Tsurumi, who accuses him of killing the soldiers. Asirpa and Retar track Sugimoto and find Shiraishi, who tells her Sugimoto's location.
5	5	"Race"; Transliteration: "Kakeru" (Japanese: 駆ける)	Akira Toba	Sachio Yanai	Akira Toba	May 7, 2018
Sugimoto is tortured by twin brothers Youhei and Kouhei Nikaidō. Shiraishi breaks into Sugimoto's cell and releases his bonds, allowing him to kill Youhei. He fakes a fatal injury using Youhei's intestines, and is able to escape and reunite with Asirpa. While hunting, Asirpa and Sugimoto come across the tracks of two men: Tanigaki and Tetsuzō Nihei, a famous bear hunter.
6	6	"Hunter's Soul"; Transliteration: "Ryōshi no Tamashī" (Japanese: 猟師の魂)	Michita Shiraishi	Aya Yoshinaga	Satoshi Nishimura	May 14, 2018
Nihei tells Tanigaki that he wishes to hunt Retar, the last Hokkaido wolf. Asirpa and Sugimoto are joined by Shiraishi, who tells Asirpa and Sugimoto that Nihei is a tattooed prisoner. Asirpa, Sugimoto and Shiraishi track the hunters and ambush them.
7	7	"Complication"; Transliteration: "Sakusō" (Japanese: 錯綜)	Kiyoshi Egami	Atsuo Ishino	Futoshi Higashide	May 21, 2018
Sugimoto and Shiraishi fight Nihei, while Tanigaki captures Asirpa. Tanigaki is shot by a poisoned arrow after stepping in a deer trap, but is saved by Asirpa. Retar rushes to Asirpa's aid with his mate, a grey wolf, who attacks and kills Nihei. Tanigaki is brought to Asirpa's village to recover, and tells them that Tsurumi intends to use the gold to mount a military coup to form an independent Hokkaido. At a brothel, Ushiyama finds Shiraishi and gives chase.
8	8	"Eyes of a Murderer"; Transliteration: "Satsujinki no Me" (Japanese: 殺人鬼の目)	Kazuomi Koga	Shingo Irie	Namimi Sanjo	May 28, 2018
Caught by Ushiyama, Shiraishi is pressured by Hijikata into acting as his mole in Sugimoto's group. Sugimoto, Asirpa, and Shiraishi hear rumors of Henmi Kazuo, a tattooed prisoner who is also a psychopathic killer. They go whaling and unknowingly rescue Henmi after he falls into the water. Henmi conceals his tattoo, but vows to either kill Sugimoto or die in the attempt.
9	9	"Gleaming"; Transliteration: "Kirameku" (Japanese: 煌めく)	Shigeru Fukase	Aya Yoshinaga	Miyana Okita	June 4, 2018
Hemni and Sugimoto are confronted by 7th Division soldiers. As they flee, Hemni attempts to kill Sugimoto, and they engage in a violent struggle before Sugimoto fatally stabs him. An orca beaches and grabs Hemni's body, though Sugimoto, Shiraishi and Asirpa are able to recover it. Meanwhile, Ogata and Nikaidō find Tanigaki at the Ainu village, and accuse him of killing his companions and deserting the 7th. Tanigaki realizes that there are battling factions within the 7th, and prepares to defend himself.
10	10	"Fellow Traveler"; Transliteration: "Michizure" (Japanese: 道連れ)	Michita Shiraishi	Daishirō Tanimura	Miyana Okita	June 11, 2018
Tanigaki, a Matagi, escapes his pursuers by using his skills in hunting and trapping. Tsurumi arrives, and forces Nikaidō to expose the traitors in the 7th after cutting off Nikaidō's ear, though Ogata evades capture. Elsewhere, Shiraishi is grabbed by a massive huchen after falling in a river, but is saved by Kiroranke, a former friend of Asirpa's father. Kiroranke reveals that Asirpa's father is Nopperabo, and that he is now in Abashiri Prison. They begin to travel towards Abashiri to confront Nopperabo.
11	11	"Everybody, Get Together! It's a Murder Hotel!"; Transliteration: "Satsujin Hoteruda yo zen'in shūgō!!" (Japanese: 殺人ホテルだよ全員集合!!)	Yutaka Hirata	Shingo Irie	Tomohiro Kamitani	June 18, 2018
The group and Ushiyama separately check into a hotel run by Ienaga Kano, a tattooed prisoner who murders and eats her guests. Shiraishi and Ushiyama are held in a basement torture chamber while Ienaga attempts to kill Asirpa, but is thwarted by Sugimoto. A series of events triggers an explosion that destroys the hotel, burying Ushiyama and Ienaga in the rubble. Sugimoto's group continue on to Abashiri Prison.
12	12	"Trickster Fox"; Transliteration: "Taburakasu Kitsune" (Japanese: 誑かす狐)	Akira Toba	Noboru Takagi	Akira Toba	June 25, 2018
Shiraishi meets Ushiyama and Ienaga, who survived the explosion, but does not disclose this to Sugimoto. Sugimoto's group encounter Inkarmat, a traveling Ainu fortune teller who Asirpa does not trust. Shiraishi takes Inkarmat to a horse race, where they win two races on Inkarmat's predictions. Kiroranke meets old friends at the track, who ask him to ride a horse and throw the race at the behest of a yakuza boss. Shiraishi bets all his money on the last race, but it is won by Kiroranke, who defies the yakuza boss. In Barato, Ogata meets with Hijikata and joins his group.

== Home media release ==
=== Japanese ===
NBCUniversal Entertainment Japan (Japan – Region 2/A)
Volume	Episodes	Release date	Ref.
1	1–4	July 27, 2018	
2	5–8	August 29, 2018	
3	9–12	October 6, 2018	
