= Golden Kamuy season 2 =

Season of television series

Golden Kamuy
- Season 2
- Cover of the fourth home media volume as released by NBCUniversal Entertainment Japan
- No. of episodes: 12

Release
- Original network: Tokyo MX
- Original release: October 8 – December 24, 2018

Season chronology
- ← Previous; Season 1 Next → Season 3

The second season of the Golden Kamuy anime television series is based on Satoru Noda's manga series of the same name and adapts from the 8th volume to the 14th (chapters 70–139). At the conclusion of the first season broadcast, a second season was announced and aired from October 8 to December 24, 2018. The staff and cast returned to reprise their roles.

The opening theme is "Reimei" by Sayuri and My First Story while the ending theme is "Tokeidai no Kane" by Eastern Youth.

== Episodes ==
No. overall	No. in season	Title (Note: English translated titles are taken from Crunchyroll.)	Directed by	Written by	Storyboarded by	Original release date
13	1	"Edogai-kun"; Transliteration: "Edogai-kun" (Japanese: 江渡貝くん)	Masato Miyoshi	Noboru Takagi	Miyana Okita	October 8, 2018
While searching for the body of a tattooed prisoner stolen from his grave, Tsurumi encounters Edogai Yasaku, a taxidermist who creates clothing from human skin. Tsurumi wins Edogai's affections by praising his skills, and commissions Edogai to create fake tattooed skins to confuse the other treasure hunters. At Asirpa's village, a recovered Tanigaki promises Huci that he will bring Asirpa home safely. He is joined by Inkarmat, unaware that she is working for Tsurumi.
14	2	"Fakes"; Transliteration: "Magaimono" (Japanese: まがいもの)	Kiyoshi Egami	Aya Yoshinaga	Kiyoshi Egami	October 15, 2018
Sugimoto and Shiraishi track Hajime Tsukishima, a sergeant in the 7th, back to Edogai's workshop, and find it under attack by Ogata. Edogai flees into a mine, where he is caught in a series of explosions; he dies, but is able to relay to Tsukishima how to distinguish the fake skins. Hijikata and Sugimoto's groups meet, and reluctantly agree to cease hostilities now that Tsurumi possesses fake tattooed skins.
15	3	"Let's Talk About the Past"; Transliteration: "Mukashi no Hanashi o Shiyō" (Japanese: 昔の話をしよう)	Satoshi Nakagawa	Noboru Takagi	Takeshi Mori	October 22, 2018
The collected groups search Edogai's workshop for a way to identify the fake tattoos, but are attacked by the 7th. The groups split up, with plans to reunite in Ashibetsu. Elsewhere, Tanigaki and Inkarmat agree to travel with the orphan Cikapasi. Hijikata makes plans to break into Abashiri Prison to question Nopperabo, utilizing Shiraishi's escape skills. After a dream where Sugimoto kills him for his betrayal, Shiraishi flees, but encounters the 7th.
16	4	"The Great Plan to Infiltrate the Asahikawa 7th Division!!"; Transliteration: "Asahikawa Daishichi Shidan Sennyū Daisakusen" (Japanese: 旭川第七師団潜入大作戦!!)	Taketomo Ishikawa	Noboru Takagi	Taketomo Ishikawa	October 29, 2018
Shiraishi is captured by the 7th, though Hijikata and Kiroranke attempt and fail to rescue him. Tsurumi meets his old friend Lt. General Arisaka, a weapon designer who gives Nikaidō a false leg that can fire buckshots. Hijikata introduces his companions to Kiyohiro Suzukawa, a con artist and tattooed prisoner. Suzukawa disguises himself as Shirosuke Inudō, the warden of Abashiri Prison, in an elaborate plan to rescue Shiraishi.
17	5	"Inside the Belly"; Transliteration: "Hara no Uchi" (Japanese: 腹の中)	Shigeru Fukase	Aya Yoshinaga	Miyana Okita	November 5, 2018
The disguised Suzukawa attempts to bribe the 7th for Shiraishi's freedom, but he is killed by Second Lt. Koito Otonoshin, who foils the plot on Tsurumi's behalf. Sugimoto flees with Asirpa, Ogata, and Shiraishi on an experimental hydrogen airship, though they are pursued by Koito. The group manages to throw Koito off the ship and escape the 7th by travelling through the Daisetsuzan mountains.
18	6	"Ani Nekko"; Transliteration: "Ani Nekko" (Japanese: 阿仁根っ子)	Akira Toba	Aya Yoshinaga	Akira Toba	November 12, 2018
Tanigaki receives a telegram informing him that Huci is near death. He reflects on his friendship with Kenkichi, a fellow Matagi who married and later murdered Tanigaki's sister; he vowed revenge, and joined the 7th after hearing a rumor that Kenkichi had joined the army. He later encountered a dying and blinded Kenkichi at the Battle of 203 Hill, who told Tanigaki that he euthanized his sister after she caught smallpox. In the present, Tanigaki's group finds Asirpa, Sugimoto, Ogata and Shiraishi.
19	7	"Kamuy Hopunire"; Transliteration: "Kamui Hopunire" (Japanese: カムイホプニレ)	Takuo Suzuki	Aya Yoshinaga	Miyana Okita	November 19, 2018
Tanigaki informs Asirpa of Huci's failing health, though Asirpa wishes to continue the search for the gold. They are joined by Nihei's dog Ryu, who has followed the scent of his former master's gun, now carried by Tanigaki. Meanwhile, Tsurumi tells Koito the truth behind the death of Lt. General Kōjirō Hanazawa, former commander of the 7th. Hanazawa abandoned Ogata, his illegitimate son, rendering his mistress neurotic. Ogata poisoned his mother, killed his half-brother (Hanazawa's legitimate son) at the Battle of 203 Hill, and murdered his father, staging his death to resemble a ritual suicide in penance for the loss at 203 Hill. Tsurumi exploited Hanazawa's death to motivate the 7th against the Japanese government.
20	8	"Blue Eyes"; Transliteration: "Aoi Me" (Japanese: 青い眼)	Futoshi Higashide	Shingo Irie	Futoshi Higashide	November 26, 2018
A locust swarm separates Asirpa and Inkarmat from the group, where Asirpa questions Inkarmat about her father. Inkarmat says that Asirpa's father is Wilk, a Polish-Ainu man with blue eyes who was killed by Kiroranke. Elsewhere, the men cook sea otter meat given to Inkarmat and Tanigaki, and become aroused from its aphrodisiac effects. Reunited, Kiroranke denies Inkarmat's accusation. Despite mounting distrust, the group agrees to continue on to Abashiri. In Abashiri, Inudō attempts to kill Usami, a new guard feeding information about Nopperabo to the 7th, but is unsuccessful.
21	9	"The Sound of an Ambush"; Transliteration: "Kishū no Ne" (Japanese: 奇襲の音)	Shigeru Fukase	Aya Yoshinaga	Kanta Kamei	December 3, 2018
At a village near Lake Kussharo, Sugimoto's group learn about a group of blind bandits led by a man with strange tattoos. Shiraishi identifies him as Toni Anji, an Abashiri prisoner. The group is attacked by the bandits while the men are bathing in an onsen, but are rescued by Hijikata and Ushiyama, who are seeking Anji's tattoo. Mid-escape, Inkarmat has a premonition that she will die after falling underwater, but is saved by Tanigaki. Meanwhile, Usami reports to Lt. Tsurumi that Inudō is stockpiling weapons.
22	10	"On the Night of the New Moon"; Transliteration: "Shingetsu no Yoru Ni" (Japanese: 新月の夜に)	Kiyoshi Egami	Daishirō Tanimura	Kiyoshi Egami	December 10, 2018
Sugimoto's and Hijikata's groups secretly tunnel into Abashiri Prison and link up with Chief Kadokura, an associate of Hijikata's. On a moonless night, they launch the escape plan: Inkarmat, Cikapasi, Nagakura and Ienaga wait behind; Ogata stands lookout; Kiroranke, Ushiyama and Hijikata stand by; and Sugimoto, Asirpa, Shiraishi, and Anji enter the prison. They find a substitute in Nopperabo's cell, who screams and raises the alarm. Amid the chaos, Tsurumi and 7th Division attack the prison from the river in warships, seeking both Nopperabo and Asirpa.
23	11	"Overwhelmed"; Transliteration: "Jūrin" (Japanese: 蹂躙)	Masato Miyoshi, Taketomo Ishikawa	Noboru Takagi	Takeshi Mori	December 17, 2018
Under the guise of quelling a prison riot, Tsurumi leads an assault on Abashiri Prison. Tsurumi corners Sugimoto in Nopperabo's cell, but Kadokura releases the master prison lock to save himself, freeing all of the prison's inmates. Hijikata and Anji take Asirpa and follow Inudou to a chapel where Wilk is being held, but Asirpa flees. Sugimoto escapes, but is badly wounded by Nikaidō. As Sugimoto drags himself away, he encounters a crippled man with blue eyes.
24	12	"Call Out"; Transliteration: "Koō" (Japanese: 呼応)	Shigeru Fukase	Noboru Takagi	Namimi Sanjo	December 24, 2018
The blue-eyed man confirms he is Wilk after seeing Asirpa's makiri, (Note: A traditional knife of the Ainu with a wooden handle and scabbard which are hung from a belt by a lanyard.) but says he will only reveal the location of the gold to Asirpa. Wilk tells Sugimoto that he wished to raise Asirpa to be the guerrilla leader of the Ainu, and that he did not kill the Ainu to acquire the gold. Sugimoto and Wilk are suddenly shot in the head by Ogata, and Wilk dies. Tanigaki pulls them out of the line of fire, then finds Inkarmat stabbed and she warns him that Kiroranke has betrayed them. Shiraishi flees with Asirpa, where they are joined by Kiroranke and Ogata, who tells them that Wilk and Sugimoto are both dead. Sugimoto awakens heavily bandaged, while Inkarmat recovers nearby, watched by Tsurumi. Assuming that Kiroranke is taking Asirpa to his associates in Karafuto, Tsurumi sends Tsukishima and Koito with Sugimoto and Tanigaki to intercept them. Asirpa has a dream in which Sugimoto tells her that he is still alive.

== Home media release ==
=== Japanese ===
NBCUniversal Entertainment Japan (Japan – Region 2/A)
Volume	Episodes	Release date	Ref.
4	13–16	January 30, 2019	
5	17–20	February 28, 2019	
6	21–24	March 27, 2019	
