= List of Golden Kamuy characters =

A selection of the characters from the series

The manga series Golden Kamuy features an extensive cast of characters created by Satoru Noda.

== Sugimoto's group ==
Saichi Sugimoto (杉元 佐一, Sugimoto Saichi)
Voiced by: Chikahiro Kobayashi (Japanese); Ian Sinclair (English)
Portrayed by: Kento Yamazaki
A demobilized soldier and veteran of the Russo-Japanese War. He served a private first class in the 1st Division of the Imperial Japanese Army, and fought in the battle of 203 Hill. He was feared for his savage fighting style and amazing toughness on the battlefield, gaining the nickname "Immortal Sugimoto" (不死身の杉元, Fujimi no Sugimoto). He seeks the gold to provide for Umeko (梅子), the blind wife of his dead comrade Toraji (寅次).
Asirpa (Ainu: アシㇼパ)
Voiced by: Haruka Shiraishi (Japanese); Monica Rial (English)
Portrayed by: Anna Yamada
A young Ainu hunter who meets Sugimoto after saving him from a wild bear, and later partners with him to find the gold. She seeks to avenge her father, who she believes was murdered by hunters searching for the gold. Her Japanese name is Asuko Kochoube (小蝶辺 明日子, Kochōbe Asuko).
Yoshitake Shiraishi (白石 由竹, Shiraishi Yoshitake)
Voiced by: Kentarō Itō (Japanese); Ben Phillips (English)
Portrayed by: Yuma Yamoto
A tattooed Abashiri convict and master escape artist. He is initially captured by Sugimoto, and later agrees to a truce after they need each other's help to survive the bitter cold after they fall in a river. He is based on Yoshie Shiratori.
Genjirō Tanigaki
See Genjirō Tanigaki.
Kiroranke
See Kiroranke.

== Hijikata’s group ==
Toshizō Hijikata (土方 歳三, Hijikata Toshizō)
Voiced by: Jouji Nakata, Yuichi Nakamura (young) (Japanese); Greg Dulcie (English)
Portrayed by: Hiroshi Tachi
A fictionalized version of the Shinsengumi commander of the same name who fought against the Meiji Restoration. Assumed to have been dead for decades, he was held in secret as a political prisoner before escaping alongside the tattooed convicts. He forms a group to search for the gold, which he plans to use to fund the secession of Hokkaido and creation of a second Republic of Ezo.
Shinpachi Nagakura (永倉 新八, Nagakura Shinpachi)
Voiced by: Takayuki Sugō, Kazuya Nakai (young) (Japanese); Kent Williams (English)
Portrayed by: Katsumi Kiba
A fictionalized version of the Shinsengumi captain of the same name. Loyal to Hijikata, he learns he is still alive while working as the swordsmanship instructor for the guards at Kabato Prison.
Tatsuuma Ushiyama (牛山 辰馬, Ushiyama Tatsuuma)
Voiced by: Kenji Nomura (Japanese); Christopher R. Sabat (English)
Portrayed by: Katsuya
A muscled judoka who killed his master. He allies himself with Hijikata in pursuit of the gold, but does not share his nationalistic ambitions.
Kadokura
See Kadokura.
Anji Toni (都丹 庵士, Toni Anji)
Voiced by: Yū Mizushima (Japanese); Kenny Green (English)
A blind, elderly prisoner who uses echolocation to find his victims.
Kantarō Okuyama (夏太郎, Okuyama Kantarou)
Voiced by: Wataru Hatano
Hidoro's minion who later joins Hijikata's group.
Kirawus (Ainu: キラウㇱ)
Voiced by: Tomoaki Maeno (Japanese); Chris Gardner (English)
An Ainu hunter. He works with Kadokura to support Hijikata's group.
Kano Ienaga
See Kano Ienaga.
Hyakunosuke Ogata
See Hyakunosuke Ogata.

== The Hokkaido 7th Division ==
Tokushirō Tsurumi (鶴見 篤四郎, Tsurumi Tokushirō)
Voiced by: Hōchū Ōtsuka (Japanese); David Wald (seasons 1–4), Robert McCollum (season 5) (English)
Portrayed by: Hiroshi Tamaki
A first lieutenant, platoon leader and military intelligence officer in the 7th Division of the Imperial Japanese Army. Harboring a grudge against the Japanese government for their failure to extract remuneration from Russia for Japanese veterans of the Russo-Japanese War, he seeks to use the Ainu gold to lead a coup d'état to form an independent Hokkaido. His forehead is covered by a ceramic plate, due to a head injury he sustained from an artillery bombardment during the Russo-Japanese War. Consequently, he suffers from the after effects of severe brain damage, including mood swings and sudden outbursts of violence.
Hyakunosuke Ogata (尾形 百之助, Ogata Hyakunosuke)
Voiced by: Kenjiro Tsuda (Japanese); Orion Pitts (English)
Portrayed by: Gordon Maeda
A superior private and sniper in the 7th Division. He is the illegitimate son of Kojirō Hanazawa (花沢 幸次郎, Hanazawa Kojirō), a lieutenant general who was the commander of the 7th during the Russo-Japanese War. Ogata tried unsuccessfully to corrupt Yuusaku Hanazawa, his virtuous younger half-brother and legitimate son of Kojirō, but eventually shoots him during the Battle of Hill 203. He is skeptical about Tsurumi's ambitions and deserts the army, initially joining Hijikata's group. He later joins the Sugimoto group, however he eventually colludes with Kiroranke to find the gold.
Genjirō Tanigaki (谷垣 源次郎, Tanigaki Genjirō)
Voiced by: Yoshimasa Hosoya (Japanese); David Matranga (English)
Portrayed by: Ryohei Otani
A Matagi and a private first class of the 7th Division who joined the army to find the matagi Kenkichi Aoyama (青山 賢吉, Aoyama Kenkichi) who killed his sister Fumi (フミ). After an extended stay in a kotan (Ainu village) to recover from an injury, he joins Sugimoto's group to fulfill a promise to Asirpa's grandmother to bring Asirpa home safely.
Hajime Tsukishima (月島 基, Tsukishima Hajime)
Voiced by: Eiji Takemoto (Japanese); Quinn Angell (English)
Portrayed by: Asuka Kudo
A sergeant in the 7th Division. Stoic and serious, he often acts as the straight man to Tsurumi's and Koito's eccentric personalities. He grew up on the island of Sado where he was persecuted because of his violent and brutal father. He loved a woman called Igogusa, so named because of her seaweed-like hair, but when he returned from the Sino-Japanese War, he found that his father had told Igogusa that Hajime was dead and she apparently threw herself into the sea. Tsurumi approached Tsukishima when he was on death row in prison after killing his father and Tsurumi manipulated him into joining the 7th Division and becoming a Russian interpreter. Tsukishima became so loyal to Tsurumi that he risked his own life to save Tsurumi during a Russian artillery bombardment when Tsurumi lost part of his forehead.
Otonoshin Koito (鯉登 音之進, Koito Otonoshin)
Voiced by: Katsuyuki Konishi (Japanese); Daman Mills (English)
Portrayed by: Taishi Nakagawa
A second lieutenant in the 7th from Satsuma. As a naval cadet and spoiled son of wealthy Commander Heiji Koito, he was kidnapped by Russian agents and saved by Tsurumi to whom he became fiercely loyal. He is intelligent although sheltered and inexperienced, but is an excellent swordsman, trained in Jigen-ryū.
Kōhei Nikaidō (二階堂 浩平, Nikaidō Kōhei)
Voiced by: Tomokazu Sugita (Japanese); Stephen Sanders (English)
Portrayed by: Shuntarō Yanagi
A private first class in the 7th Division. Seeks revenge for his twin brother, Youhei Nikaidou (二階堂 洋平, Nikaidō Yōhei), who was killed by Sugimoto. A running gag in the series is how he continuously loses body parts following his encounters with Sugimoto.
Tokishige Usami (宇佐美, Usami Tokishige)
Voiced by: Yoshitsugu Matsuoka (Japanese); Kyle Igneczi (English)
A superior private in the 7th Division. He is unfailingly loyal to Tsurumi; when Tsurumi turned two moles on Usami's face into stick figures with a fountain pen, Usami had them turned into tattoos.
Mokutarō Kikuta (菊田 杢太郎, Kikuta Mokutarou)
Voiced by: Kenyu Horiuchi (Japanese); Patrick McAllister (English)
A Warrant Officer of the 7th Division who collects rare weapons. His favorite weapon is the Nagant M1895. He was also an older-brother figure to Sugimoto.
Rikimatsu Ariko (有古 力松, Ariko Rikimatsu)
Voiced by: Masaaki Mizunaka (Japanese); Jason Douglas (English)
An Ainu man and a Private First Class of the 7th Division. His Ainu name is Ipopte (イポㇷ゚テ, Ipopte) and his father was one of the men killed by Noppera-bo. Tsurumi discovers that he is secretly working with Hijikata and turns him into a double agent.
Yōhei Nikaidō (二階堂 洋平, Nikaidō Yōhei)
Voiced by: Tomokazu Sugita (Japanese); Stephen Fu (English)
Portrayed by: Shuntarō Yanagi
A private first class in the 7th Division, who attempts to kill Sugimoto together with his twin brother Kōhei, but gets killed by Sugimoto instead.
Yuusaku Hanazawa (花沢勇作, Hanazawa Yuusaku)
Voiced by: Tasuku Hatanaka (Japanese); Josh Grelle (English)
He was the Second Lieutenant of the 7th Division and the Flag-Bearer during Russo-Japanese War and Ogata's younger half-brother.

== The Abashiri Prison ==
Shirosuke Inudō (犬童 四郎助, Inudō Shirosuke)
Voiced by: Takaya Hashi (Japanese); Mark Stoddard (English)
Portrayed by: Kazuki Kitamura
The Abashiri Prison warden, an experienced swordsman.
Kadokura (門倉, Kadokura)
Voiced by: Yoshito Yasuhara (Japanese); David Novinski (English)
The head jailer of Abashiri Prison who collaborates with Hijikata. He tends to have poor luck which he attributes to being born under a bad star, however sometimes his poor choices have a beneficial result.
Tokishige Usami
See Usami.

== The Abashiri Convicts ==
"Noppera-bo" (のっぺら坊, Nopperabō; 'No Face')
Voiced by: Fake Noppera-bo: Kōichi Sōma (Japanese); Travis Mullenix (English)
A pseudonymous prisoner who murdered seven Ainu to steal and hide a large quantity of gold, the location of which is in a treasure map in the form of tattoos painted on the bodies of 24 prisoners. His true identity is Wilk.
Yoshitake Shiraishi
See Yoshitake Shiraishi.
Toshizō Hijikata
See Toshizō Hijikata.
Tatsuuma Ushiyama
See Tatsuuma Ushiyama.
Gotō (後藤, Gotō)
Voiced by: Yutaka Aoyama (Japanese); Charlie Campbell (English)
Portrayed by: Makita Sports
A murderer who drunkenly informed Sugimoto of the existence of the tattooed skins.
Tetsuzō Nihei (二瓶 鉄造, Nihei Tetsuzō)
Voiced by: Akio Ōtsuka (Japanese); Jarrod Greene (English)
Portrayed by: Takahiro Fujimoto
A famous bear hunter who is fixated on killing Retar, one of the last Hokkaido wolves.
Kazuo Henmi (辺見 和雄, Henmi Kazuo)
Voiced by: Toshihiko Seki (Japanese); Austin Tindle (English)
Portrayed by: Masato Hagiwara
A serial killer with masochistic tendencies.
Kano Ienaga (家永 カノ, Ienaga Kano)
Voiced by: Sayaka Ohara (Japanese); Terri Doty (English)
Originally named Chikanobu Ienaga (家永 親宣, Ienaga Chikanobu), a transgender woman and former doctor who feeds on the flesh of her victims to become youthful and beautiful.
Kiichirō Wakayama (若山 輝一郎, Wakayama Kiichirō)
Voiced by: Banjō Ginga (Japanese); Michael Stimac (English)
Portrayed by: Kiyohiko Shibukawa
A yakuza boss, and Nakazawa's lover.
Kiyohiro Suzukawa (鈴川 聖弘, Suzukawa Kiyohiro)
Voiced by: Taiten Kusunoki (Japanese); Charlie Campbell (English)
Portrayed by: Kazuhiro Yamaji
A con man and expert impressionist.
Keiichirō Sakamoto (坂本 慶一郎, Sakamoto Keiichirō)
Voiced by: Koichi Yamadera
A professional thief known as "The Lightning Thief" (稲妻強盗, Inazuma Gōtō), and O-Gin's husband.
Shiton Anehata (姉畑 支遁, Anehata Shiton)
Voiced by: Hideyuki Hōri
A scholar and zoophile. His appearance is based on Ernest Thompson Seton.
Maiharu Gansoku (岩息 舞治, Gansoku Maiharu)
Voiced by: Kenta Miyake (Japanese); Chris Guerrero (English)
A martial artist who escaped north to the island of Sakhalin and specializes in the Russian fighting sport of stenka. He relished his time in prison as an opportunity to indulge in the hand to hand combat through which he sought fulfilment.
Shinzō Doi (土井 新蔵, Doi Shinzō)
Voiced by: Motomu Kiyokawa, Daisuke Ono (young) (Japanese); R. Bruce Elliott (English)
An elderly former assassin (originally named Yōichirō (用一郎)) known as "Manslayer Yōichirō" (人斬り用一郎, Hitokiri Yōichirō). He moved to Nemuro in Hokkaido 30 years earlier and married an Ainu woman, but was sent to Abashiri Prison after killing the man who took his wife hostage.
Waichirō Sekiya (関谷 輪一郎, Sekiya Waichirō)
Voiced by: Yasuyuki Kase (Japanese); Dallas Reid (English)
A veterinarian and expert in poisons. He lost faith in god after his daughter was struck and killed by lightning and he placed his victims in life or death situations which would determine their fate. He is eventually killed by Hijikata who survived one of Sekiya's traps.
Heita Matsuda (松田 平太, Matsuda Heita)
Voiced by: Akira Ishida (Japanese); Derick Snow (English)
A small man with googly eyes and an expert gold panner. He once earned 50 yen a day by catching platinum sand, the price of which was suddenly skyrocketing as a material for the nibs of fountain pens. After Sugimoto saved his life, he teaches him how to pan for gold. He carries an Ainu cigarette case and a brown bear fur. Sugimoto and the others call him "Master Heita". In fact, he has multiple personalities.
Keiji Ueji (上エ地 圭二, Ueji Keiji)
Voiced by: Nobuyuki Hiyama, Mariko Higashiuchi^{Ep. 52 credits} (young) (Japanese); Randy Pearlman (English)
A mentally unstable inmate who multiple tattoos everyone on his body and wears a cloth over his face to hide them. His habit is to trick and prank people, as he loves their looks of disappointment. After a troubled childhood, he started to prank and tell jokes to children, before abducting and burying them in his backyard.
Fusatarō Ōsawa (大沢 房太郎, Ōsawa Fusatarō)
Voiced by: Tomokazu Seki (Japanese); Major Attaway (English)
Also known as Boutarou the Pirate (海賊 房太郎, Kaizoku Bōtarō) due to the different ways the kanji in his name can be read, Ozawa is a charismatic and cunning bandit and swashbuckler with an immense affinity for deep swimming, as he has large feet and webbed hands. Due to his talents, he started pulling people under water in his youth and robbing them, totalling at least 55 confirmed murders.
Michael Ostrog (マイケル・オストログ, Maikeru Osutorogu)
Voiced by: Satoshi Mikami
Michael Ostrog is a man in his fifties with a well-built stature, presumably of European descent, suspected of being the heinous Jack the Ripper, who is responsible for a string of gruesome murders in London, nearly two decades prior to his escape from Abashiri Prison. He is based on the real life Ripper suspect with the same name, Michael Ostrog.

== The Ainu ==
Asirpa
See Asirpa.
Wilk (Ainu: ウイルク, Polish: Wilk, Russian: Вилк)
Voiced by: Hiroki Tōchi (Japanese); Barry Yandell (English)
Asirpa's biological father. He is a mixed Polish and Karafuto Ainu who fled to Hokkaido. He stole the Ainu gold and assumed the pseudonym Noppera-bo, his ultimate goal being to use it to start an Ainu revolution against the Japanese government, with his daughter as their leader.
Kiroranke (Ainu: キロランケ)
Voiced by: Masaki Terasoma (Japanese); Ricco Fajardo (English)
Portrayed by: Hiroyuki Ikeuchi
A friend of Asirpa's father and veteran of the 7th Division. His true identity is Yulbars (ユルバルス) (Russian: Юлбарс), a Tatar with Karafuto Ainu ancestry. A revolutionary and partisan in Russia, he assassinated Alexander II with Wilk at the age of 15, and seeks to use the gold to mount an invasion of Hokkaido.
Inkarmat (Ainu: インカㇻマッ)
Voiced by: Mamiko Noto (Japanese); Felecia Angelle (English)
Portrayed by: Maryjun Takahashi
A sly and cunning Ainu fortune-teller. Though Asirpa calls her "Cironnup" ("fox" in Ainu) and dismisses her as a scam artist, many of her prophecies have proven true. As a child she became acquainted with Wilk, which led to her affection for Asirpa later in life.
Asirpa's grandmother ("Huci") (Ainu: フチ)
Voiced by: Miyuki Ichijo (Japanese); Jessica Cavanagh (English)
Portrayed by: Hisako Okata
An elderly woman who raised Asirpa following the death of her parents.
Cikapasi (Ainu: チカパシ)
Voiced by: Akeno Watanabe (Japanese); Howard Wang (English)
An orphaned Ainu boy who travels with Tanigaki and Inkarmat.
Osoma (Ainu: オソマ)
Voiced by: Ayaka Asai (Japanese); Apphia Yu (English)
Asirpa's cousin.
Makanakkuru (Ainu: マカナックル)
Voiced by: Atsushi Ono (Japanese); Jim Johnson (English)
Asirpa's uncle and Osoma's father.
Enonoka (Ainu: エノノカ)
Voiced by: Kana Ichinose (Japanese); Sarah Wiedenheft (English)
A Karafuto Ainu girl.

== Others ==
Retar (Ainu: レタㇻ)
One of the last surviving Hokkaido wolves.
Ryū (リュウ)
Nihei's Hokkaido dog.
Vasily Pavlichenko (ヴァシリ パヴリチェンコ, Vashiri Pavurichenko) (Russian: Василий Павличенко)
Voiced by: Yūichirō Umehara (Japanese); Josh Grelle (English)
A Russian sniper pursuing Wilk and Kiroranke. During his pursuit, he is caught in a sniper duel with Ogata, during which he ends up shot in the mouth. He starts pursuing Ogata after this, continuously following Sugimoto's group to catch Ogata.
Sofia Golden Hand (ソフィア・ゴールデンハンド, Sofia Gōruden Hando) (Russian: София Золотая Рука))
Voiced by: Kimiko Saitō, Atsuko Yuya (young) (Japanese); Emily Fajardo (English)
A descendant of Russian aristocracy, and leader of the Russian partisans. Inspired by the con artist of the same name.
Yasaku Edogai (江渡貝 弥作, Edogai Yasaku)
Voiced by: Yuma Uchida (Japanese); Brandon McInnis (English)
Portrayed by: Yuki Furukawa
A taxidermist who secretly preserves the bodies of humans. He is employed by Tsurumi to create fake tattooed skins.
Tatsuya Nakazawa (仲沢 達弥, Nakazawa Tatsuya)
Voiced by: Hideyuki Tanaka
Portrayed by: Tomoki Kimura
A yakuza, and Wakayama's lover.
Chōan Kumagishi (熊岸 長庵, Kumagishi Chōan)
Voiced by: Toshio Furukawa
Portrayed by: Yu Tokui
A counterfeit painter, and Shiraishi's former cellmate at Kabato Prison.
O-Gin (お銀)
Voiced by: Kotono Mitsuishi
A professional thief known as "Viper O-Gin" (蝮のお銀, Mamushi no O-Gin), and Keiichirō's wife.
Takuboku Ishikawa (石川 啄木, Ishikawa Takuboku)
Voiced by: Kohsuke Toriumi (Japanese); Landon McDonald (English)
A fictionalized version of the poet of the same name. A journalist.
Kenzō Tamoto (田本 研造, Tamoto Kenzō)
Voiced by: Eizō Tsuda
A fictionalized version of the photographer of the same name. An old friend of Hijikata.
Niheiji Nozawa (野沢 仁平治, Nozawa Niheiji)
Voiced by: Rikiya Koyama
Hanaeko Kaneko (金子 花枝子, Kaneko Hanaeko)
Voiced by: Shizuka Itō
Hanaeko is the daughter of a wealthy Tokyo socialite who was conspiring with Hanazawa's mother to seduce and marry him, in order to save him from the dangers of being a flag bearer.
