= Sonya Golden Hand =

Russian con artist

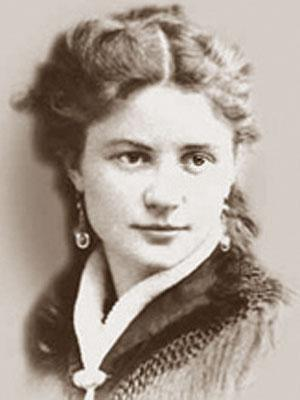
Sonya Golden Hand, c. 1870

Sofia Ivanovna Blyuvshtein (also spelled as Bluvstein, Bluvsztejn; better known as Sonia (Son'ka) the Golden Hand; 1846–1902), was a female con artist who lived in the Russian Empire and was eventually convicted of theft. She committed several carefully planned robberies, and was eventually captured and exiled to the Sakhalin penal colony. She became the basis of several books and films, in which she is romanticized as a Robin Hood figure, who never killed, and who stole only from the rich.

In 1890, she met Anton Chekhov, who was visiting Sakhalin during his investigations into prison reform; he subsequently described the incident in his book Sakhalin Island.

A headless statue by an unmarked grave in Moscow's Vagankovo Cemetery is used as a shrine to Sonia; worshippers, who believe Sonya to be buried there, ask for her spiritual assistance in their own crimes.

== Origin ==
Little is known of her life and origin for certain as she never provided real information about herself. She was married several times. She was born as Sheindlia-Sura Leibovna Solomoniak in 1846 (or perhaps in 1859) in Povozki in the Warsaw district.

== Famous cases ==
=== The robbery of the jeweler Karl von Mel ===
During May 1883 a beautiful and well-dressed young lady entered the von Mel jewelry store and introduced herself as the wife of well-known psychiatrist. She had expensive tastes and selected a variety of items worth thirty thousand rubles. She asked for the jewelry to be hand-delivered by the owner to her home address where her rich husband would pay for the items. At the appointed time, the jeweler with the collection of diamonds arrived at the doctor's residence. The beautiful wife met him and took the box of jewels explaining that she wished to wear them that night. She invited him to wait in her husband's office. Later the doctor arrived and asked the jeweler what he wanted. When the jeweler made a compliment on the sophisticated taste of his gorgeous wife and persistently insisted to be paid for the items he had just delivered, medical orderlies captured him and took him away to a mental hospital. As it was later revealed, the lady had arrived just before the time assigned for the jewelry to be delivered and presented herself to the doctor as a wife of von Mel. She said that her elderly husband had gone crazy over buying diamonds, and paid for his treatment upfront. Of course, the con artist had disappeared with all the treasure and no one saw it ever again.

=== Banker Dogmarov's robbery ===
During October 1884 in Odessa at cafe "Fanconi" the banker Mr. Dogmarov noticed quite a beautiful lady who identified herself as Mrs. Sofia San Donato. After some pleasant conversation she asked him to change a thousand rubles bill. Soon the banker learned that she was leaving for Moscow by evening train, the same as he. The banker suggested that he accompany her. In the sleeping compartment they politely conversed, laughed, and ate chocolate candies. In the morning, after having a good sleep, the banker found neither his money nor securities for the sum of 43,000 rubles.

=== The robbery of Khlebnikov jewelry store in Petrovka Street ===
During August 1885 the manager of a jewelry store T. recommended a collection of adornments for 22,300 rubles to a Courland baroness, Sofia Buxhoeveden. When the treasures were picked and nicely packed, the honorable lady recalled that she forgot all her money at home. She took the jewelry and left in a hurry after the requested amount, leaving as the guarantee accompanying her relatives – gray haired father and a little baby girl on governess' hands. She promised she would return very shortly and pay for the jewelry. When two hours later the owner of the store reported the robbery to the police station they found out that these "relatives" were hired on Khitrovka market by an advertisement published in a newspaper.

The public was excited over Son'ka's tricks. The popularity of Golden Hand among the people was so great that in the epoch of the absence of television news she was recognized on the street. At first this even helped her - the excited crowd could push aside the police. But soon her reputation began to seriously interfere with Son'ka's shady business. Moreover, with the years Sofia Blyuvshteyn became sentimental. She returned 5,000 rubles to a widow robbed by her, who had two daughters. To the actor of a small theater in the impulse of feelings she sent to the scene a gold watch just stolen from someone in the theater's lobby. After seeing in the hotel room a sleeping young man near whom laid the gun and the letter to the mother with the acknowledgement about spending of 300 rubles given out to the treatment of his sister, Son'ka took out of her purse 500 ruble bill, put it in young man's hand and slipped out from the room. Furthermore, she spent the enormous amount of money on her two daughters' education, who, inheriting the artistic talent of the mother, came out subsequently on the musical-comedy scene, but thoroughly hid their origin.

== Meeting with Anton Chekhov ==
When Anton Chekhov met Sonya in 1890, she was being held in solitary confinement, clamped in leg irons, in Alexandrovsk. Chekhov wrote: "Looking at her, it is impossible to believe that not long ago she was beautiful to such a degree that she charmed her prison guards, as she did in Smolensk, for example, where the overseer helped her to escape and himself ran away with her."

By the time of this meeting, Blyuvshtein—perhaps in her mid-40s—was a "small, skinny, already graying woman with a crumpled, old-womanish face," Chekhov wrote. She had lived freely in exile on Sakhalin but was moved to solitary confinement after escaping from the island dressed as a soldier. She managed to carry out several crimes before being recaptured.

There are two movies that are based on this story which are called Sonya Golden Hand and Sonya and the Legend Continued, which is about her younger daughter committing theft together with her mother.

== Adaptations ==
- 1915 Six-episode silent melodrama, jointly directed by Iurii Iurevskii and Vladimir Kasianov, produced by Alexander Drankov
- 1936 in the film Desire, Marlene Dietrich plays a glamorous jewel thief whose crime mimics the Karl von Mel robbery.
- 2001 The first episode of the 2001 Sonka Golden Hand miniseries, which was broadcast by Rossiya the same day that Boris Yeltsin died, was watched by 29% of Russian viewers.
- 2006 Viktor Merezhko's novel, Son'ka—Zolotaia ruchka, published by Amfora
- 2007 Viktor Merezhko's TV movie series Son'ka Golden-Hands (Son'ka—Zolotaia ruchka)
- 2018 Golden Kamuy
