= List of Golden Kamuy chapters =

Golden Kamuy volume 1 cover, featuring Sugimoto

Golden Kamuy is a Japanese manga series written and illustrated by Satoru Noda. It is set in Hokkaido, Japan, and follows Saichi "Immortal" Sugimoto, a Japanese soldier surviving the Russo-Japanese War, trying to provide for his dead comrade's wife, and Asirpa, an Ainu girl searching for her father's murderer. The two search for a hidden stash of Ainu gold, stolen by a criminal group, which also is targeted by the 7th Division of the Imperial Japanese Army.

The manga was serialized in Shueisha's seinen manga magazine Weekly Young Jump from 2014 to 2022. Its chapters have been collected in 31 tankōbon volumes, published by Shueisha in Japan from 2015 to 2022 and by Viz Media in North America from 2017 to 2024.

== Volume list ==
No.	Original release date	Original ISBN	English release date	English ISBN
1	January 19, 2015	978-4-08-890082-7	June 20, 2017	978-1-4215-9488-0
1. "Immortal Sugimoto" (不死身の杉元, Fujimi no Sugimoto); 2. "Wenkamuy" (ウェンカムイ, Wenkamui); 3. "Trap" (罠, Wana); 4. "Noppera-bo" (のっぺら坊, Nopperabō); 5. "Hokuchin Unit" (北鎮部隊, Hokuchin butai); 6. "Persecution" (迫害, Hakugai); 7. "The Escape King" (脱獄王, Datsugoku-ō)
2	February 19, 2015	978-4-08-890105-3	September 19, 2017	978-1-4215-9489-7
8. "Flight" (逃走, Tōsō); 9. "Cornered Rat" (窮鼠, Kyūso); 10. "Gamble" (博打, Bakuchi); 11. "Ainu Kotan" (アイヌコタン, Ainu Kotan); 12. "Kamuy Mosir" (カムイモシリ, Kamui Moshiri); 13. "Guardian Spirit" (憑き神, Tsuki-gami); 14. "Howling" (遠吠え, Tōboe); 15. "Scent" (におい, Nioi); 16. "Shinigami" (死神, Shinigami); 17. "Trackers" (追跡者, Tsuiseki-sha)
3	May 19, 2015	978-4-08-890192-3	December 19, 2017	978-1-4215-9490-3
18. "Rescue Operation" (救出作戦, Kyūshutsu sakusen); 19. "Race" (駆ける, Kakeru); 20. "Disagreement" (喰い違い, Kui-chigai); 21. "Ghost" (亡霊, Bōrei); 22. "The Legendary Bear Hunter" (伝説の熊撃ち, Densetsu no kumauchi); 23. "Hunter's Spirit" (猟師の魂, Ryōshi no tamashī); 24. "What Lives On" (生き抜いた価値, Ikinuita kachi); 25. "Yuk" (ユク, Yuku); 26. "The Law of the Mountain" (山の掟, Yama no okite); 27. "The Scent of Killing" (殺しの匂い, Koroshi no nioi)
4	August 19, 2015	978-4-08-890240-1	March 20, 2018	978-1-4215-9491-0
28. "Complication" (錯綜, Sakusō); 29. "The Old Man and the Mountain" (老人と山, Rōjin to yama); 30. "Legend" (言い伝え, Iitsutae); 31. "203 Meter Hill" (二〇三高地, Ni hyaku san kōchi); 32. "Attack of the Mysterious Giant Bird" (怪奇！謎の巨大鳥, Kaiki! Nazo no kyodai tori); 33. "Run Like Hell" (呪的逃走, Juteki tōsō); 34. "Contact" (接触, Sesshoku); 35. "Courtship" (求愛, Kyūai); 36. "Useless" (役立たず, Yakutatazu); 37. "The Start of Spring" (初春, Hatsuharu); 38. "Humpe" (フンペ, Funpe)
5	December 18, 2015	978-4-08-890325-5	June 19, 2018	978-1-4215-9492-7
39. "Fishing for a Killer" (ニシン漁と殺人鬼, Nishin-ryō to satsujinki); 40. "Herring Mansion" (ニシン御殿, Nishin goten); 41. "Shine" (煌めく, Kirameku); 42. "Repunkamuy" (レプンカムイ, Repunkamui); 43. "Sinna Kisar" (シンナキサラ, Shin'nakisara); 44. "Sniper" (狙撃, Sogeki); 45. "Tanigaki the Matagi" (マタギの谷垣, Matagi no Tanigaki); 46. "Punishment" (刑罰, Keibatsu); 47. "Huchen Flower" (イトウの花, Itō no hana); 48. "Kiroranke" (キロランケ, Kiroranke)
6	March 18, 2016	978-4-08-890372-9	September 18, 2018	978-1-4215-9493-4
49. "Companion" (道連れ, Michidzure); 50. "Spring Thunder" (春雷, Shunrai); 51. "Let's All Stay at the Murder Hotel!" (殺人ホテルだよ全員集合！！, Satsujin hoteru dayo zen'in shūgō!!); 52. "Selfish Longing" (無い物ねだり, Naimono nedari); 53. "Ushiyama the Undefeated" (不敗の牛山, Fuhai no Ushiyama); 54. "Message" (ことづて, Kotodzute); 55. "Nanjuro Nishin" (鰊七十郎, Nishin Nanjūrō); 56. "Matsumae Domain" (松前藩, Matsumae-han); 57. "Bubble" (水泡, Suihō); 58. "Barato Showdown" (茨戸の烏合, Barato no ugō); 59. "Bodyguard of the Snow-Swept Plains" (雪原の用心棒, Setsugen no yōjinbō)
7	April 19, 2016	978-4-08-890451-1	December 18, 2018	978-1-4215-9494-1
60. "Ikatkar Cironnup, the Trickster Fox" (イカッカラ・チロンヌプ 誑かす狐, Ikakkara chiron'nupu taburakasu kitsune); 61. "The Ezo Derby" (蝦夷地ダービー, Ezo-chi dābī); 62. "Kiroranke, the Substitute Jockey" (替え玉騎手キロランケ, Kaedama kishu kiroranke); 63. "Monster" (モンスター, Monsutā); 64. "Osoma in the Forest of Demons" (悪魔の森のオソマ, Akuma no mori no osoma); 65. "Immortal Beast" (不死身の赤毛, Fujimi no akage); 66. "The House Where Fear Dwells" (恐怖の棲む家, Kyōfu no sumu ie); 67. "Chou-Han" (丁半, Chōhan); 68. "Intrusion" (侵入, Shin'nyū); 69. "Escape" (脱出, Dasshutsu)
8	August 19, 2016	978-4-08-890493-1	February 19, 2019	978-1-4215-9495-8
70. "The Man from Amur River" (アムール川から来た男, Amūru-gawa kara kita otoko); 71. "An Exemplary Artisan" (職人の鑑, Shokunin no kagami); 72. "Edogai" (江渡貝くん, Edogai-kun); 73. "Season of Women" (女の季節, On'na no kisetsu); 74. "Cikapasi" (チカパシ, Chikapashi); 75. "Roots in Ani" (阿仁根っ子, Ani Nekko); 76. "Kane Mochi" (カネ餠, Kane Mochi); 77. "Fake" (まがいもの, Magaimono); 78. "Yubari Coal Mine" (夕張炭鉱, Yūbari tankō); 79. "Great Emergency" (大非常, Dai-hijō); 80. "Message" (伝言, Dengon)
9	November 18, 2016	978-4-08-890554-9	April 16, 2019	978-1-9747-0447-7
81. "Destruction" (隠滅, Inmetsu); 82. "Nikaido" (二階堂, Nikaidō); 83. "Love Fortune" (恋占い, Koi uranai); 84. "Imprisoned" (獄中, Gokuchū); 85. "The Long Road of Love" (恋路いくとせ, Koiji ikutose); 86. "Let's Talk About the Past" (昔の話をしよう, Mukashi no hanashi o shiyou); 87. "Manners" (お行儀, O gyōgi); 88. "The Long-Eared Monster Cometh" (耳ながお化けがやって来る!, Miminaga obake ga yattekuru!); 89. "Silent Kotan" (沈黙のコタン, Chinmoku no Kotan); 90. "Artist" (芸術家, Geijutsuka)
10	March 17, 2017	978-4-08-890589-1	June 18, 2019	978-1-9747-0448-4
91. "Turep" (トゥレプ, Twurepu); 92. "Disguise" (変装, Hensō); 93. "Kamuy Kotan" (カムイコタン, Kamui Kotan); 94. "Functional Beauty" (機能美, Kinō-bi); 95. "Look-Alikes" (似ているもの, Nite iru mono); 96. "Clairvoyance" (千里眼, Senrigan); 97. "Asahikawa 7th Division Infiltration Plan" (旭川第七師団潜入大作戦, Asahikawa Dai shichi shidan sennyū Dai-sakusen!!); 98. "Satsuma Hayato" (薩摩隼人, Satsuma Hayato); 99. "Airship" (飛行船, Hikōsen); 100. "Mount Daisetsu" (大雪山, Daisetsuzan)
11	August 18, 2017	978-4-08-890639-3	August 20, 2019	978-1-9747-0449-1
101. "Second Lieutenant Koito Gets Scolded" (鯉登少尉叱られる, Koito shōi shikarareru); 102. "The Lightning Thief and Viper O-Gin" (稲妻強盗と蝮のお銀, Inazuma gōtō to mamushi no o-gin); 103. "Anglerfish Hot Pie" (あんこう鍋, Ankō nabe); 104. "The Giant Serpent of the Hokkaido Wilderness! A Battle Against Fatal Poison!" (恐怖の猛毒大死闘！北海道奥地に巨大蛇は存在した!, Kyōfu no mōdoku dai shitō! Hokkaidō okuchi ni kyodai hebi wa sonzai shita!); 105. "The Bugs of Summer" (夏の虫, Natsu no mushi); 106. "Faster than Bullets" (弾より速く, Tama yori hayaku); 107. "Sleep" (眠リ, Nemuri); 108. "Great Wetlands" (大湿原, Dai-shitsugen); 109. "Kamuynomi" (カムイノミ, Kamuinomi); 110. "Shiton Animal Record" (支遁動物記, Shiton Dōbutsu-ki)
12	December 19, 2017	978-4-08-890779-6	October 15, 2019	978-1-9747-0450-7
111. "Keepsake" (忘れ形見, Wasuregatami); 112. "Ukochanupkor" (ウコチャヌプコロ, Ukochanupukoro); 113. "Sayonara, Anehata" (さよなら姉畑先生, Sayonara Anehata sensei); 114. "Echinke" (エチンケ, Echinke); 115. "Locust Plague" (蝗害, Kōgai); 116. "Blue Eyes" (青い目, Aoi me); 117. "Onward to Abashiri" (網走へ, Abashiri e); 118. "Cleaning Up a Mess" (尻拭い, Shirinugui); 119. "Kotan-Kor-Kamuy" (コタンコロカムイ, Kotan koro kamui); 120. "The Sound of a Surprise Attack" (奇襲の音, Kishū no oto)
13	March 19, 2018	978-4-08-890888-5	December 17, 2019	978-1-9747-0500-9
121. "In the Dark" (暗中, Anchū); 122. "Inkarmat the Seer" (インカラマツ 見る女, Inkarmat miru on'na); 123. "Turning the Tables" (形勢逆転, Keisei Gyakuten); 124. "A Photograph for Memory's Sake" (思い出の写真, Omoide no Shashin); 125. "The Bountiful Season" (実りの季節, Minori no Kisetsu); 126. "Chief Guard Kadokura" (門倉看守部長, Kadokura Kanshu Buchō); 127. "Real Citatap" (本当のチタタプ, Hontō no Chitatapu); 128. "On the Night of the New Moon" (新月の夜に, Shingetsu no Yoru ni); 129. "The Panopticon" (五翼放射状平屋舎房, Goyoku hōshajō hiraya shabō); 130. "Guiding Lights" (誘導灯, Yūdō-tō)
14	June 19, 2018	978-4-08-891048-2	February 18, 2020	978-1-9747-0784-3
131. "Appetite for Destruction" (破壊欲, Hakai yoku); 132. "Overrun" (蹂躙, Jūrin); 133. "Seven Hundred Violent Men" (700人の凶悪犯, Nana hyaku nin no kyōaku-han); 134. "The Lecture Hall" (教誨堂, Kyōkaidō); 135. "Chain Death Match" (鎖デスマッチ, Kusari Desumatchi); 136. "The Last Samurai" (最後の侍, Saigo no Samurai); 137. "Confirmation" (呼応, Koō); 138. "Loss" (喪失, Sōshitsu); 139. "Onward to Karafuto" (樺太へ, Karafuto e); 140. "Ainu Girl" (アイヌの女の子, Ainu no on'nanoko)
15	September 19, 2018	978-4-08-891098-7; 978-4-08-908315-4 (limited edition)	April 21, 2020	978-1-9747-0785-0
141. "Karafuto Ainu" (樺太アイヌ, Karafuto Ainu); 142. "Resident Russian Village" (在留ロシア人の村, Zairyū Roshiajin no Mura); 143. "Stenka" (スチェンカ, Suchenka); 144. "Whamma! Wall Death Match!" (激突！壁デスマッチ, Gekitotsu! Kabe Desumatchi); 145. "Mister No Control" (ミスター制御不能, Misutā Seigyo Funō); 146. "Banya: Russian Steam Bath" (ロシア式蒸し風呂バーニャ, Roshia-shiki Mushiburo Bānya); 147. "Don't Kill the Sea Lions" (トドを殺すな！, Todo o korosu na!); 148. "Roots" (ルーツ, Rūtsu); 149. "Igogusa" (いご草, Igogusa); 150. "Remains" (遺骨, Ikotsu)
16	December 19, 2018	978-4-08-891176-2	June 16, 2020	978-1-9747-0956-4
151. "Musk Deer" (ジャコジカたち, Jako-jika tachi); 152. "Assassin" (人斬り, Hitokiri); 153. "Kyoto" (京都, Kyōto); 154. "The Time Left" (残り時間, Nokori jikan); 155. "Yamada Circus" (ヤマダ曲馬団, Yamada kyokubadan); 156. "Immortal Sugimoto's Hara-Kiri Show" (不死身の杉元ハラキリショー, Fujimi no Sugimoto Harakiri Shō); 157. "An Amazing Circus on Karafuto Island" (樺太島大サーカス, Karafuto-tō Dai-sākasu); 158. "Main Event" (大トリ, Ōtori); 159. "The Uilta People" (ウイルタ民族, Uiruta minzoku); 160. "The Border" (国境, Kokkyō)
17	March 19, 2019	978-4-08-891229-5	August 18, 2020	978-1-9747-1489-6
161. "Kamuy Renkayne" (カムイ レンカイネ, Kamui Renkaine); 162. "A Good Sniper" (狙撃手の条件, Sogekishu no jōken); 163. "Wanted List" (指名手配書, Shimei tehai sho); 164. "Ill Omen" (悪兆, Akuchō); 165. "Standard-Bearer" (旗手, Kishu); 166. "Request" (頼み, Tanomi); 167. "Whiteout" (白くらみ, Shiro kurami); 168. "The Elderly Lighthouse Keepers" (灯台守の老夫婦, Tōdaimori no rōfūfu); 169. "Mekooyashi" (メコオヤシ, Meko oyasi); 170. "The Female Inmate of Ako Prison" (亜港監獄の女囚, A-kō kangoku no joshū)
18	June 19, 2019	978-4-08-891334-6	October 20, 2020	978-1-9747-1490-2
171. "Karafuto Ainu Punishment" (樺太アイヌの刑罰, Karafuto Ainu no keibatsu); 172. "Around Lake Akan" (阿寒湖のほとりで, Akanko no hotori de); 173. "My Monster" (僕の怪人, Boku no Kaijin); 174. "Running Across the Lake" (湖の中心で突っ走る, Mizuumi no chūshin de tsuppashiru); 175. "Cocoons" (繭, Mayu); 176. "Various Gods" (それぞれの神様, Sorezore no kamisama); 177. "Hasegawa Photography" (長谷川写真館, Hasegawa shashin-kan); 178. "Revolutionaries" (革命家, Kakumeika); 179. "Mamiya Strait" (間宮海峡, Mamiya kaikyō); 180. "Ako Prison Break" (亜港監獄, A-kō kangoku)
19	September 19, 2019	978-4-08-891368-1; 978-4-08-908315-4 (limited edition)	December 15, 2020	978-1-9747-1706-4
181. "Siberian Tiger" (アムールトラ, Amūru Tora); 182. "The Father I Never Knew" (私の知らない父のこと, Watashi no shiranai chichi no koto); 183. "To Catch Up with Wolves" (狼に追いつく, Ōkami ni oitsuku); 184. "Ice Floes" (流氷原, Ryūhyōgen); 185. "Reunion" (再会, Saikai); 186. "Things Left Behind" (忘れ物, Wasuremono); 187. "Sin and Impurity" (罪穢れ, Tsumi kegare); 188. "To Live" (生きる, Ikiru); 189. "Bloodstains" (血痕, Kekkon); 190. "For Tomorrow" (明日のために, Ashita no tame ni)
20	December 19, 2019	978-4-08-891437-4	February 16, 2021	978-1-9747-1873-3
191. "Water From Home" (故郷の水, Kokyō no mizu); 192. "Contract Renewal" (契約更新, Keiyaku kōshin); 193. "Noboribetsu Hot Springs" (登別温泉, Noboribetsu onsen); 194. "The Smell of Sulfur" (硫黄のにおい, Iō no nioi); 195. "Ariko's Garden" (有古の庭, Ariko no niwa); 196. "Mos" (モス, Mosu); 197. "Spoiled Brat" (ボンボン, Bonbon); 198. "Otonoshin's Tricycle" (音之進の三輪車, Otonoshin no sanrinsha); 199. "The Russian Consolate on the Hill" (坂の上のロシア領事館, Saka no ue no roshia ryōjikan); 200. "Someone with Tsukisappu Anpan" (月寒あんぱんのひと, Tsukisamu anpan no hito)
21	March 19, 2020	978-4-08-891501-2	April 20, 2021	978-1-9747-1997-6
201. "Farewell, Russia" (あばよロシア, Abayo Roshia); 202. "A Sniper's Nightmare" (狙撃手の悪夢, Sogeki-shu no akumu); 203. "Portraits" (似顔絵, Nigao e); 204. "What Must Remain" (残したいもの, Nokoshitai mono); 205. "Cinematograph" (シネマトグラフ, Shinematogurafu); 206. "The Distance Between Them" (二人の距離, Futari no kyori); 207. "The Moon Visible from the Trenches" (塹壕から見えた月, Zangō kara mieta tsuki); 208. "Gray Infinitely Close to Black" (限りなく黒に近い灰色, Kagirinaku kuro ni chikai haiiro); 209. "Kesorap" (ケソラプ, Kesorapu); 210. "Sweet Lies" (甘い嘘, Amai uso); 211. "Shiraishi's Wrath" (怒りのシライシ, Ikari no Shiraishi)
22	June 19, 2020	978-4-08-891582-1	June 15, 2021	978-1-9747-2182-5
212. "Hackles Raised" (怒り毛, Ikari ke); 213. "Escape from Karafuto" (樺太脱出, Karafuto dasshutsu); 214. "Ikazuchi-class Destroyer vs. Karafuto Ferry" (雷型駆逐艦VS樺太連絡船, Kaminari gata kuchiku kan vs. Karafuto renraku sen); 215. "Ice Floe Angels" (流氷の天使, Ryūhyō no tenshi); 216. "The Mysterious White Bear" (謎の白い熊, Nazo no shiroi kuma); 217. "To Hokkaido" (北海道にて, Hokkaidō nite); 218. "Gold Diggers" (砂金掘り師たち, Sakin horishi tachi); 219. "Master Heita" (平太師匠, Heita shishō); 220. "Pelt" (毛皮, Kegawa); 221. "Bear Man" (ヒグマ男, Higuma otoko)
23	September 18, 2020	978-4-08-891704-7; 978-4-08-908375-8 (limited edition)	August 17, 2021	978-1-9747-2185-6
222. "Tattooed Human Skins" (刺青人皮, Shisei ni kawa); 223. "Nikaido Gets High" (二階堂 元気になる, Nikaidō genki ni naru); 224. "Near Lake Shikotsu" (支笏湖のほとりで, Shikotsu ko no hotori de); 225. "The Slums" (貧民窟, Hinmin kutsu); 226. "Holy Ground" (聖地, Seichi); 227. "Accomplices" (共犯, Kyōhan); 228. "Long-Tailed Tit" (シマエナガ, Shima Enaga); 229. "Perfect Mother" (完璧な母, Kanpeki na haha); 230. "Kano Ienaga" (家永カノ, Ienaga kano); 231. "Childbirth" (出産, Shussan)
24	December 18, 2020	978-4-08-891737-5	December 21, 2021	978-1-9747-2521-2
232. "Family" (家族, Kazoku); 233. "Candy Seller" (飴売り, Ameuri); 234. "Steamship" (蒸気船, Jōki-sen); 235. "The Mailman from Hell" (地獄の郵便配達人, Jigoku no Yūbin Haitatsunin); 236. "The King" (王様, Ōsama); 237. "Underwater Breath-Holding Competition" (水中息止め合戦, Suichū Ikidome Gassen); 238. "To the One You Love" (好きな人に, Sukinahitoni); 239. "Discharge" (発射, Hassha); 240. "Special Sergeant Major Kikuta" (菊田特務曹長, Kikuta Tokumu Sōchō)
25	March 18, 2021	978-4-08-891813-6	February 15, 2022	978-1-9747-2722-3
241. "The Missing Kamuy" (消えたカムイ, Kieta Kamui); 242. "Taking Turns" (交互に, Kōgo ni); 243. "Superior Privates" (上等兵たち, Jōtō-hei-tachi); 244. "Landing at Otaru" (小樽上陸, Otaru Jōriku); 245. "Reunion Town" (再会の街, Saikai no Machi); 246. "Ainu Icon" (アイスの偶像, Aisu no Gūzō); 247. "The Pattern" (決まり事, Kimariji); 248. "Church" (教会, Kyōkai); 249. "Various Dreams" (それぞれの夢, Sorezore no Yume); 250. "Skyrocket" (打ち上げ花火, Uchiage Hanabi)
26	June 18, 2021	978-4-08-892011-5	May 17, 2022	978-1-9747-3108-4
251. "Sapporo Brewery" (札幌ビール工場, Sapporo Bīru Kōjō); 252. "The Beer Storage Room" (貯酒室, Choshu-shitsu); 253. "Her Father's Sullied Name" (父の汚名, Chichi no Omei); 254. "Cornered Rat" (窮鼠, Kyūso); 255. "Sugimoto the Ripper" (切り裂き杉元, Kirisaki Sugimoto); 256. "Tokushirou's Number One" (篤四郎さんの一番, Tokushirō-san no Ichiban); 257. "Disappointed Face" (がっかりした顔, Gakkari Shita Kao); 258. "Burden" (がっかりした顔, Omoni); 259. "Making a Homeland" (放郷を作る, Hō Gō o Tsukuru); 260. "Guard at Any Cost" (死守, Shishu)
27	September 17, 2021	978-4-08-892074-0	September 20, 2022	978-1-9747-3247-0
261. "Fire Brigade" (消防組, Shōbō-gumi); 262. "The Sapporo Beer Car Chase" (札幌麦酒宣伝車追跡劇, Sapporo Bīru Senden-sha Tsuiseki Geki); 263. "Oosawa Fusatarou, Also Known as Boutarou the Pirate" (海賊房太郎こと大沢房太郎, Kaizoku Fusatarō Koto Ōsawa Fusatarō); 264. "The Woman He Saw at the Hospital in Otaru" (小樽の病院で見た女, Otaru no Byōin de Mita On'na); 265. "Keyhole" (鍵穴, Kagiana); 266. "Pinky Finger Bones" (小指の骨, Koyubi no Hone); 267. "Severed" (断絶, Danzetsu); 268. "A Single Poison Arrow" (一本毒矢, Ippon Dokuya); 269. "Wilk's Way of Doing Things" (ウイルクのやり方, Uiruku no Yarikata); 270. "The Cause of It All" (全ての元凶, Subete no Genkyō); 271. "A Mottled Gold Coin" (まだら模様の金貨, Madara Moyō no Kinka)
28	December 17, 2021	978-4-08-892162-4	February 21, 2023	978-1-9747-3476-4
272. "Ipopte" (イポㇷ゚テ, Ipopte); 273. "The Tsurumi Theater" (鶴見劇場, Tsurumi Gekijō); 274. "Obsession" (だわり, Kodawari); 275. "Tokyo Love Story" (東京愛物語, Tōkyō Aimonogatari); 276. "Fried Shrimp" (エビフライ, Ebifurai); 277. "Operation Defend Hanazawa Yuusaku's Virginity" (花沢勇作童貞防衛作戦, Hanazawa Yūsaku Dōtei Bōei Sakusen); 278. "Lady Kaeko and Swinging-Dick Vargant Boy" (花枝子お嬢様とふりちんノラ坊, Kaeko Ojōsama to Furi-chin Nora bō); 279. "My Achievement" (俺の手柄, Ore no Tegara); 280. "Signal Gun of Determination" (決意の号砲, Ketsui no Gōhō)
29	April 19, 2022	978-4-08-892243-0	June 20, 2023	978-1-9747-3653-9
281. "People of Hakodate" (函館のひと, Hakodate no Hito); 282. "Moment" (一刻, Ikkoku); 283. "The "God" Tattoo" (神の刺青, Kami no Irezumi); 284. "Our Kamuy" (私たちのカムイ, Watashitachi no Kamui); 285. "The Final Battle" (最終決戦, Saishū Kessen); 286. "Time Limit" (タイムリミット, Taimu Rimitto); 287. "Kadokura's Horse" (門倉の馬, Kadokura no Uma); 288. "Fresh Man" (爽やかな男, Sawayakana Otoko); 289. "Siege of Goryoukaku" (五稜郭攻囲戦, Goryōkaku kōi-sen); 290. "The Statue of Kannon" (観音像, Kan'non-zō)
30	June 17, 2022	978-4-08-892294-2	October 17, 2023	978-1-9747-4061-1
291. "Antique" (骨董品, Kotsutōhin); 292. "Hakodate Bay Naval Battle" (函館湾海戦, Hakodatewan Kaisen); 293. "Intruder" (侵入者, Shin'nyū-sha); 294. "Silence" (静寂, Shijima); 295. "The Two" (ふたり, Futari); 296. "Bushido" (武士道, Bushidō); 297. "Escape from Goryokaku" (五稜郭脱出, Goryōkaku Dasshutsu); 298. "Wilk's Daughter" (ウイルクの娘, Uiruku no Musume); 299. "Forgiveness" (許し, Yurushi); 300. "Extra Overtime" (再延長戦, Sai enchō-sen); 301. "Second Group" (第二陣, Dainijin); 302. "Mayhem on the Train" (車内暴力, Shanai Bōryoku)
31	July 19, 2022	978-4-08-892370-3	January 16, 2024	978-1-9747-4179-3
303. "Runaway Train" (暴走列車, Bōsō Ressha); 304. "History" (歴史, Rekishi); 305. "Doubt" (迷い, Mayoi); 306. "Suicide Attack" (特攻, Tokkou); 307. "Professor Penis" (ちんぽ先生, Chinpo Sensei); 308. "Two of a Kind" (似た者同士, Nitamono Dōshi); 309. "Drenched in Blood" (血濡れ事, Chinuregoto); 310. "Blessed" (祝福, Shukufuku); 311. "Asirpa's Choice" (アシㇼパの選択, Ashiripa no Sentaku); 312. "Share" (分け前, Wakemae); 313. "Last Stop" (終着, Shūchaku); 314. "Finale" (大団円, Daidanen)
