= Golden Kamuy =

Japanese manga series

- First tankōbon volume cover, featuring Saichi Sugimoto

ゴールデンカムイ (Gōruden Kamui)
- Genre: Adventure; Historical; Japanese-style Western
- Manga
- Written by: Satoru Noda
- Published by: Shueisha
- English publisher: NA: Viz Media
- Imprint: Young Jump Comics
- Magazine: Weekly Young Jump
- Original run: August 21, 2014 – April 28, 2022
- Volumes: 31
- Anime television series
- Directed by: Hitoshi Nanba (S1–3); Shizutaka Sugahara (S4–5) (Note: Credited as Chief Director (チーフディレクター, Chīfu Direkutā).)
- Produced by: Ryousuke Mori; Kazuaki Takahashi; Naokado Fujiyama; Toshihiro Suzuki; Shunsuke Hasegawa (S1); Satoshi Tanaka (S1–3); Rie Ukai (S1–3); Yukitoshi Suyama (S2); Rei Kudou (S3–4); Kenji Kuroda (S4); Mai Tani (Note: The Kanji spelling is 谷舞, which may be Japanese "Mai Tani" (or another reading), or Chinese "Wu Gu".) (S4)
- Written by: Noboru Takagi
- Music by: Kenichiro Suehiro
- Studio: Geno Studio (S1–3); Brain's Base (S4–5)
- Licensed by: Crunchyroll; SEA: Muse Communication
- Original network: Tokyo MX, ytv, STV, BS11
- English network: SEA: Animax Asia
- Original run: April 9, 2018 – March 30, 2026
- Episodes: 62 + 5 OVAs
- Original net animation

Golden Dōga Gekijō
- Directed by: Kenshirō Morii
- Studio: DMM.futureworks; W-Toon Studio
- Released: April 16, 2018 – June 27, 2023
- Episodes: 47 + 6 OVAs
- Live-action
- Golden Kamuy (2024 film); Golden Kamuy: The Hunt of Prisoners in Hokkaido (2024 TV series); Golden Kamuy: The Abashiri Prison Raid (2026 film); Golden Kamuy: Karafuto Pursuit Arc (2027 TV series)
- icon

Golden Kamuy (Japanese: ゴールデンカムイ, Hepburn: Gōruden Kamui) is a Japanese manga series written and illustrated by Satoru Noda. It was serialized in Shueisha's seinen manga magazine Weekly Young Jump from August 2014 to April 2022, with its chapters collected in 31 tankōbon volumes. The story follows Saichi Sugimoto, a veteran of the early twentieth-century Russo-Japanese War, and Asirpa, a young Ainu girl. Together, they embark on a journey to search for a vast fortune in gold that once belonged to the Ainu. The Ainu language in the story was supervised by Hiroshi Nakagawa, an Ainu language linguist from Chiba University.

An anime television series adaptation produced by Geno Studio aired with two seasons from April to December 2018. A third season aired from October to December 2020. A fourth season produced by Brain's Base aired from October 2022 to June 2023. A fifth season, adapting most of the manga's final arc, aired from January to March 2026, and a sequel adapting the remainder has been announced for Q4 2026. A live-action film adaptation opened in Japanese theaters in January 2024, with its story continuing as a live-action television series that released in October 2024 and a sequel film that premiered in March 2026. The manga has been licensed for an English-language release by Viz Media since 2016.

By July 2024, the Golden Kamuy manga had over 29 million copies in circulation. The manga won the ninth Manga Taishō in 2016 and the 22nd Tezuka Osamu Cultural Prize in 2018.

== Synopsis ==
=== Background ===
Golden Kamuy takes place in the aftermath of the Russo-Japanese War, primarily in Hokkaido and the surrounding regions. Detailing the many real-life political, technological, and cultural developments of Japan at the time; several key parts of the series are fictionalized versions of real-life people and events. Specific focus is given to the indigenous Ainu people and their culture, such as exploring their language and the way they respectfully use natural resources to thank the Kamuy they believe provide them. Later parts of the story also explore the different subcultures within the Ainu and the hardships they suffered by being caught in Japanese-Russian territorial conflicts. The plot also explores the severe struggles of soldiers and war veterans, with moral ambiguity, survivor's guilt, honour, penance, and virtue ethics being common themes.

The central MacGuffin comes from an in-universe tall tale of an Ainu mining group, said to have unearthed 20 kan (Note: 112.5 kg or 248 lbs) of gold. (Note: Valued in the 2014 manga at around JP¥800m, approximately US$7.7m) One miner murdered the others and hid the gold, only to be captured by Japanese authorities before he could share the location. Disappeared by the government and hidden in Abashiri Prison, the Ainu miner was isolated, hobbled and tortured for the location. To relay the location outside, the Ainu miner tattooed many parts of a ciphered map onto his fellow prisoners, offering them a cut of the gold for sharing it with his comrades outside. The prison eventually recognized the code, but was unable to read it and attempted to transport the tattooed men elsewhere; the tattoed convicts overpowered and killed their captors, scattering into the night.

=== Premise ===
Saichi Sugimoto, a veteran of the battle of Hill 203, works as a panner in Hokkaido to provide for the widow of his dead comrade. Sugimoto is approached by a drunk old man, who tells him a dubious legend of a huge gold cache; it can only be found by connecting a cyphered map, split into strange tattoos on Abashiri Prison escapees. Sugimoto laughs off the tall tale, only to awaken the next day to find the old man pointing his gun at him, apologizing for saying too much. Overpowering the old man, Sugimoto pursues him into the woods, finding him killed by a bear and with a large, geometric tattoo across his chest, back and shoulders. Saved from the bear by a young Ainu girl named Asirpa, Sugimoto realizes the story is true and suggests they recover the Ainu gold together. Asirpa is uninterested in the gold but wants vengeance for her father, one of the Ainu miners who was killed in the betrayal.

Examining the body, they realize the tattoos have seams, meaning that the prisoners were always intended to be murdered and skinned. Due to her opposition to needless killing, Asirpa suggests they try to co-operate with prisoners they find by simply tracing their tattoos. Soon recruiting Shiraishi, an escape artist and tattooed convict, Sugimoto's group find themselves clashing and co-operating with other parties collecting the tattoos: First Lieutenant Tsurumi, the insane leader of the 7th Division, and Hijikata Toshizō, who is touted as the last living samurai.

== Media ==
=== Manga ===
Written and illustrated by Satoru Noda, Golden Kamuy was serialized in Shueisha's seinen manga magazine Weekly Young Jump from August 21, 2014, to April 28, 2022. Its 314 individual chapters were collected in 31 tankōbon volumes, released between January 19, 2015, and July 19, 2022.

Viz Media announced that they licensed the manga at New York Comic Con 2016, and they released the series in North America from June 20, 2017, to January 16, 2024.

=== Anime ===
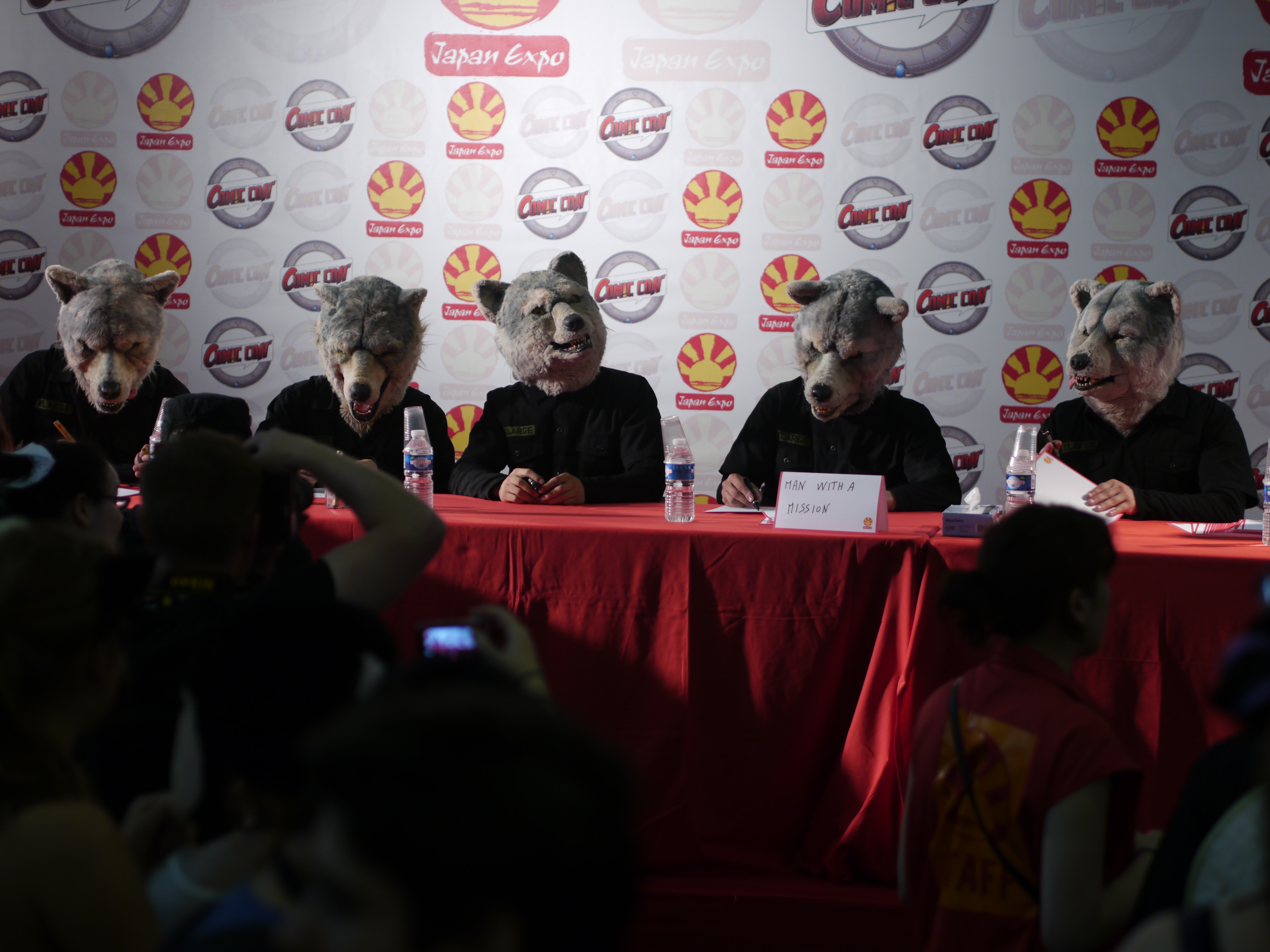
The first opening theme is performed by Man with a Mission

An anime television series adaptation was announced by Weekly Young Jump in July 2017. The series was produced by Geno Studio. It was directed by Hitoshi Nanba and written by Noboru Takagi, with music by Kenichiro Suehiro, art direction by Atsushi Morikawa, and CG direction by Yuuko Okumura and Yasutaka Hamada. Kenichi Ohnuki adapted the character designs for animation, while Koji Watanabe designed firearms, Shinya Anasuma designed the props, and Ryō Sumiyoshi designed the animals. Like with the manga, Hiroshi Nakagawa, an Ainu language linguist from Chiba University, works on the anime as an Ainu language supervisor.

It aired for 12 episodes from April 9 to June 25, 2018, on Tokyo MX, ytv, STV, and BS11. The series' opening theme is "Winding Road", performed by Man with a Mission, while the ending theme is "Hibana", performed by The Sixth Lie. Golden Dōga Gekijō (ゴールデン道画劇場; 'Golden Travelogue Theater'), a series of 25-second animated shorts based on extras included in the Golden Kamuy manga volumes and Weekly Young Jump, was directed by Kenshirō Morii and produced at DMM.futureworks and W-Toon Studio. It premiered online on April 16, 2018.

At the conclusion of the first season broadcast, a second season was announced. It aired for 12 episodes from October 8 to December 24, 2018. The second season's opening theme is "Reimei" (レイメイ), performed by Sayuri and My First Story, while the ending theme is "Tokeidai no Kane" (時計台の鐘; lit. 'The Clock Tower Bell'), performed by Eastern Youth.

On July 7, 2019, it was announced that the series would receive a third season. On March 13, 2020, it was announced that the third season would premiere in October 2020. It aired for 12 episodes from October 5 to December 21, 2020. The third season's opening theme is "Grey", performed by Fomare, while the ending theme is "Yūsetsu" (融雪; lit. 'Snow Melt'), performed by The Sixth Lie.

On December 5, 2021, it was announced that the series would receive a fourth season. Brain's Base produced the season, replacing Geno Studio. Shizutaka Sugahara served as the chief director, and Takumi Yamakawa designed the characters. Noboru Takagi is returning to write the scripts. The season premiered on October 3, 2022. The opening theme is "Never Say Goodbye", performed by ALI featuring Mummy-D, while the ending theme is "Subete ga Soko ni Arimasu You Ni" (すべてがそこにありますように。; lit. 'May Everything Be There'), performed by The Spellbound. On November 8, 2022, it was announced that the seventh episode of the season and beyond would be postponed due to the passing of a main staff member. The season restarted broadcasting from the first episode on April 3, 2023, and concluded on June 26, running for thirteen episodes.

On June 26, 2023, after the conclusion of the fourth season, a final season adapting the manga's final arc was announced to be in production. Preceded by a two-part prologue film, titled Golden Kamuy: Sapporo Beer Kōjō-hen (ゴールデンカムイ 札幌ビール工場編), which premiered theatrically in Japan on October 10 and 31, 2025, the fifth season aired from January 5 to March 30, 2026. The opening theme is "Kogane no Kanata" (黄金の彼方; lit. 'Beyond the Gold'), performed by Awich and ALI (credited as Awich × ALI), while the ending theme is "The Ballad" by Ken Yokoyama.

On March 30, 2026, after the conclusion of the fifth season, it was announced that the anime will continue with an adaptation of the "Runaway Train" arc, set to premiere in Q4 2026.

The series has been released on DVD and Blu-ray in Japan, starting in July 2018. The Japanese home video volumes include the Golden Dōga Gekijō YouTube shorts, including episodes that are exclusive to the video release. An original video animation (OVA) based on the manga's "Barato" arc was released on DVD in a bundle with the manga's 15th Japanese volume on September 19, 2018. A second OVA was released with the manga's 17th Japanese volume on March 19, 2019. A third OVA based on the "Monster" arc was released with the manga's 19th Japanese volume on September 19, 2019. A fourth OVA based on the "Shiton Animal Record" arc was bundled with the 23rd manga volume on September 18, 2020. A fifth OVA, based on the "Lightning and O-Gin" arc, was bundled on Blu-ray with the novel Golden Kamuy: Tokushirou Tsurumi no Shukugan on October 17, 2025.

The TV series is simulcast on Crunchyroll, and an English dub started streaming on Funimation starting on April 30, 2018. Crunchyroll streamed the third season in North America, Central America, South America, Europe, Africa, Oceania, the Middle East, and the Commonwealth of Independent States. Funimation streamed the third season with an English dub later. Crunchyroll began streaming the first three OVAs on December 13, 2024.

=== Live-action ===
On April 19, 2022, it was announced that a live-action film adaptation had been greenlit. The film is produced by Credeus and directed by Shigeaki Kubo, with Tsutomu Kuroiwa writing the screenplay, Yutaka Yamada composing the music, and Hiroshi Nakagawa and Deko Akibe credited for Ainu supervision. The film stars Kento Yamazaki and Anna Yamada as Saichi Sugimoto and Asirpa respectively. It premiered in Japanese theaters on January 19, 2024. Netflix released the film worldwide on May 19 of that same year.

On March 4, 2024, Wowow announced a continuation of the film's story in the form of a live-action television series. The cast and staff from the film returned, with Kenji Katagiri, Ken Ochiai and Yōsuke Satō joining Kubo as directors, and Yoshiaki Dewa joining Yamada as a composer. Titled Golden Kamuy: The Hunt of Prisoners in Hokkaido, the nine-episode series premiered on Wowow on October 6, 2024. It features a different ending theme song in each episode, with the contributing musical acts being Acidman (two songs), Alexandros, &Team, Glim Spanky, Nanashi no Tarō, Kami wa Saikoro o Furanai, Straightener, and The Spellbound. The series premiered worldwide on Netflix on February 6, 2025.

A sequel film, Golden Kamuy: The Abashiri Prison Raid (ゴールデンカムイ：網走監獄襲撃編, Golden Kamuy: Abashiri Kangoku Shūgeki-hen), was announced on December 1, 2024. It premiered in Japanese theaters on March 13, 2026. Netflix released the film worldwide on July 13 of the same year.

A sequel television series, Golden Kamuy: Karafuto Tsuiseki-hen (ゴールデンカムイ ―樺太追跡編―; 'Golden Kamuy: Karafuto Pursuit Arc'), is set to premiere on Wowow on January 25, 2027.

== Reception ==
=== Manga ===
Golden Kamuy won the ninth Manga Taishō award in 2016. It was nominated for the 20th and 21st annual Tezuka Osamu Cultural Prize in 2016 and 2017; and won the 22nd in 2018 in the Grand Prize category. It was also nominated for the 40th Kodansha Manga Award in the general category; and for an Eisner Award for Best U.S. Edition of International Material—Asia. It was ranked second in the 2016 edition of the Kono Manga ga Sugoi! list for male readers. The series won the Social Impact Award at the 24th Japan Media Arts Festival in 2021. The series also won the Grand Prize of the 51st Japan Cartoonists Association Awards in 2022. The manga was nominated for the 54th Seiun Award in the Best Comic category in 2023.

The British Museum in London used an image of the character Asirpa to promote The Citi Exhibition: Manga, which ran from May 23 to August 26, 2019.

==== Sales ====
Golden Kamuy had five million copies in print by April 2018. It charted on the Oricon Japanese Comics Rankings for the week of April 18–24, 2016, with volume seven placing eighth place. By June 2019, the manga had 10 million copies in circulation; over 17 million copies in circulation by August 2021; over 18 million copies in circulation by December 2021; over 22 million copies in circulation by June 2022; 23 million copies in circulation by September 2022; over 24 million copies in circulation by March 2023; and over 29 million copies in circulation by July 2024.

=== Live-action film ===
The first live-action film debuted at first at the Japanese box office, earning over ¥534 million on its opening weekend. It ultimately grossed ¥2.99 billion at the box office.
