= Seven Days =

Seven Days or 7 Days may refer to:

- Week, an amount of time

== Film ==
- 7 Days (2010 film) (Les 7 jours du talion), Canadian thriller film
- 7 Days (2021 film), American romantic comedy film
- Seven Days (1925 film), American silent film
- Seven Days (2007 film), South Korean crime thriller film
- Seven Days (2023 film), Singaporean supernatural drama film
- Seven Days, also known as Shiva, 2008 film by Ronit Elkabetz and her brother Shlomi

== Television ==
- 7 Days (Irish TV programme), focusing on current affairs
- 7 Days (New Zealand game show), focusing on comedy
- Seven Days (TV series), an American television series about time travel
- This Hour Has Seven Days, a Canadian television newsmagazine

== Newspapers ==
- Seven Days (newspaper), a Vermont newspaper
- 7 Days (newspaper), a British newspaper
- Zibn teg, a weekly Yiddish literary newspaper

== Magazine ==
- Seven Days (magazine), a left-leaning alternative news magazine, 1976–79
- Seiska (also known as 7 päivää, meaning "seven days"), a Finnish gossip magazine

== Music ==
- 7 Days (mixtape), a mixtape by Krept and Konan
- Seven Days (EP), a 2017 EP by PartyNextDoor

=== Songs ===
- "7 Days" (Craig David song), 2000
- "Seven Days" (Mary J. Blige song), 1998
- "Seven Days" (Sting song), 1993
- "7 Days", a song by Adriana Evans from her album Nomadic (Adriana Evans album)
- "Seven Days", a song by Bob Dylan, which appears on The Bootleg Series Volumes 1–3 (Rare & Unreleased) 1961–1991
- "Seven Days", a song by Chumbawamba on their album Tubthumper
- "Seven Days", a song by Corrosion of Conformity on their album Deliverance
- "Seven Days", a song by Level 42 on the album True Colours (Level 42 album)

== Other ==
- Seven Days (play), a 1909 play by Avery Hopwood and Mary Roberts Rinehart
- 7 Days Inn, Chinese budget hotel chain
- Seven Days (manga), a 2007 Japanese manga series written by Venio Tachibana and illustrated by Rihito Takarai
- 7DAYS, a product line of the Greek bakery company Chipita

== See also ==
- Seven Days Battles, a series of battles during the American Civil War
- Seven Day Jesus, a Contemporary Christian rock band
- Seven Days in May, a 1964 political thriller novel written by Fletcher Knebel and Charles W. Bailey
- "Seven Day Mile", a 1999 song by the Irish band The Frames
- Seven Days... Seven Nights, a 1960 French film
- Seven-Day War (disambiguation)
