= ARCAM =

ARCAM may refer to:

- ARCAM Corporation, a fictional company in the Spriggan manga series
  - ARCAM Private Army
- A&R Cambridge Ltd, a British manufacturer of hi-fi equipment branded ARCAM
- Amsterdam Centre for Architecture, an information center in the Netherlands
- U.S. Army Reserve Components Achievement Medal, United States Armed Forces

== See also ==
- Arcam AB, Swedish company
- Arkham (disambiguation)
