= Ten Count =

Ten Count may refer to:

- Ten Count (manga), a Japanese Boys-Love manga by Rihito Takarai
- Ten Count, the 18th episode of the 7th season of the American police procedural drama Law & Order: Criminal Intent
