= Morikubo =

Morikubo (written: 森久保) is a Japanese surname. Notable people with the surname include:

- Showtaro Morikubo (森久保 祥太郎) (born 1974), Japanese voice actor, actor, and singer

== See also ==
- 6643 Morikubo, main-belt asteroid
