= Rihito =

Rihito is a Japanese given name. Notable people with the given name include:

- Rihito Itagaki (born 2002), Japanese actor and model
- Rihito Takarai, (fl.2004–) Japanese manga artist
- Rihito Yamamoto (born 2001), Japanese soccer player
