= Il gatto sul G =

Japanese manga series

- Il gatto sul G.

G線上の猫 (G Senjō no Neko)
- Genre: Romance
- Manga
- Written by: Tooko Miyagi
- Published by: Taiyoh Tosho Co., Ltd.
- English publisher: NA: Digital Manga Publishing
- Magazine: TaiyoTosyo Anthology Craft
- Original run: 1999 – 2007
- Volumes: 3

Il gatto sul G. (G線上の猫, G Senjō no Neko; translated as "Cat on a G") is a Japanese manga series by Tooko Miyagi. Originally serialized in Taiyo Tosyo Anthology Craft on a quarterly basis in 1999 in Japan, the first volume was published by Taiyo Tosho Co., Ltd. in 2002. Digital Manga Publishing published the English translation of Ill gatto sul G. in 2006.

The story of Il gatto sul G revolves around a talented, but strange, violinist named Riya Narukawa who collapses in front of Atsushi Ikeda's door with bloodied hands. Music may be an escape for many people, but it traps, cages, and controls Riya. Atsushi, a "nice guy" by nature, takes in the weakened Riya the same way he takes in stray cats. Even after Riya regains consciousness, Atsushi feels that he should continue to look after Riya, and he gives Riya a key to his apartment. Little does Atsushi know that he gave the key to Riya's other half. For some reason, Atsushi just can't leave him alone. Riya does not quite know how to respond to Atsushi, but he keeps the key, despite his confusion. However, his confusion over how to regard Atsushi goes much deeper. In fact, the young, privileged musician endures struggles with a certain upperclassman who won't leave him alone and especially with himself—his other self.

ISBN 1-56970-923-8
