= Graineliers =

Japanese manga series

- First tankōbon volume cover

グランネリエ (Gurannerie)
- Genre: Science fantasy
- Manga
- Written by: Rihito Takarai
- Published by: Square Enix
- English publisher: NA: Yen Press
- Magazine: Monthly GFantasy
- Original run: September 18, 2013 – present
- Volumes: 3

Graineliers (Japanese: グランネリエ, Hepburn: Gurannerie) is a Japanese manga series written and illustrated by Rihito Takarai. It started serialization in Square Enix's Monthly GFantasy in September 2013. As of November 2018, the individual chapters have been collected into three volumes.

== Publication ==
The series is written and illustrated by Rihito Takarai, and started serialization in Square Enix's Monthly GFantasy on September 18, 2013. As of November 2018, the individual chapters have been collected into three tankōbon volumes.

At Sakura-Con 2017, Yen Press announced they licensed the series for English publication.

=== Volumes ===
No.	Original release date	Original ISBN	English release date	English ISBN
1	November 27, 2014	978-4-75-754458-1	December 19, 2017	978-0-31-641291-9
2	April 27, 2016	978-4-75-754969-2	March 27, 2018	978-0-31-641599-6
3	November 27, 2018	978-4-75-755928-8	May 21, 2019	978-1-97-535682-8

== Reception ==
Reviewers from Otaku USA, Anime UK News, and The Fandom Post praised the plot and artwork of the first volume, drawing comparisons to Fullmetal Alchemist and Seraph of the End.
