= Craft (Japanese magazine) =

Japanese manga magazine

- Cover of the 44th issue of Craft, published by Taiyō Tosho on April 19, 2010
- Categories: Yaoi
- Frequency: Bimonthly
- Founded: 1999
- Final issue: 2019 (print)
- Company: Taiyoh Tosho
- Country: Japan
- Language: Japanese
- Website: http://www.bs-garden.com/system/craft.php

Craft is a bimonthly Japanese yaoi manga magazine published by Taiyoh Tosho. It was established in 1999. A number of works published in this magazine have been licensed in English, mostly by Digital Manga Publishing.

Originally published on a quarterly basis, on October 19, 2019, Taiyoh Tosho announced that beginning with the December 2019 issue, the magazine would be distributed digitally on a bimonthly basis.

== Licensed titles published in Craft ==
- Butterfly of the Distant Day, Tooko Miyagi
- The Day I Become a Butterfly, Sumomo Yumeka
- I Give to You, Maki Ebishi
- Il gatto sul G, Tooko Miyagi
- Kiss Blue, Keiko Kinoshita
- New Beginnings, Kotetsuko Yamamoto
- No Touching At All, Kou Yoneda
- The Paradise on the Hill, Momoko Tenzen
- Same Cell Organism, Sumomo Yumeka
- Seven Days, Rihito Takarai and Venio Tachibana
- You and Harujion, Keiko Kinoshita
