= Tomoaki Maeno =

Japanese voice actor (born 1982)

- 前野 智昭
- Born: May 26, 1982 (age 44); Shimotsuma, Ibaraki, Japan
- Occupation: Voice actor
- Years active: 2001–present
- Agent: Arts Vision
- Notable work: Kobato as Kiyokazu Fujimoto; Amagami SS as Junichi Tachibana; Maken-Ki! as Takeru Minezawa; Uta no Prince-sama as Camus; Brothers Conflict as Natsume Asahina; Yowamushi Pedal as Juichi Fukutomi; Akatsuki no Yona as Son Hak; Death Parade as Decim; Aoharu x Machinegun as Masamune Matsuoka; Hitorijime My Hero as Kousuke Ooshiba; The King of Fighters as Kyo Kusanagi; Code:Realize ~Sousei no Himegimi~ as Arsène Lupin; Cells at Work! as White Blood Cell (Neutrophil) U-1146; That Time I Got Reincarnated as a Slime as Veldora Tempest
- Height: 176 cm (5 ft 9 in)
- Spouse: Mikako Komatsu (m. 2020)
- Children: 2

Tomoaki Maeno (前野 智昭, Maeno Tomoaki; born May 26, 1982) is a Japanese voice actor. He was the second main character in Cells at Work! as White Blood Cell (Neutrophil) U-1146.

== Career ==
He attended the Amusement Media Academy and the Japan Narration Actors Institute. He worked as a part-time assistant and experienced three years of custody, recruiting registration and six years of laying down. In 2010, Maeno won the New Actor Award at the 4th Seiyu Awards.

== Personal life ==
In 2020, Maeno announced that he had married voice actress Mikako Komatsu. On 17 August 2022, they announced that Komatsu was pregnant with their first child. On 15 January 2023, they welcomed their first child. On 18 September 2024, the couple announced that they are expecting their second child and that Komatsu is due around winter next year. On 14 February 2025, they welcomed their second child.

== Filmography ==
=== Anime series ===
Year	Title	Role
2008	Ga-rei -Zero-	Tōru Kanze
2008	Hell Girl: Three Vessels	Tsukio
2008	Naruto: Shippuden	Young Nagato
2008	Persona: Trinity Soul	Caster
2008	Someday's Dreamers: Summer Skies	Gota Midorikawa
2008	Toshokan Sensō	Atsushi Dōjō
2009	Bakugan Battle Brawlers: New Vestroia	Volt Luster
2009	Kobato	Kiyokazu Fujimoto
2009	K-On	Clerk
2009	Miracle Train: Ōedo-sen e Yōkoso	Reiji Higashi-Shinjuku
2009	Nyan Koi!	Kota Kawamura
2009	Sora no Manimani	Saku Oyagi
2009	White Album	Tōya Fujii
2010	Amagami SS	Junichi Tachibana
2010	B Gata H Kei	Keiichi Kanejō
2010	HeartCatch PreCure!	Myoudouin Satsuki
2010	Maid Sama!	Kanade Maki
2011	Danball Senki Wars	Haruki Izumo
2011	Fractale	Dias
2011	Inazuma Eleven GO	Yuuichi Tsurugi
2011	Maken-ki!	Takeru Oyama
2011	Sekai-ichi Hatsukoi	Kō Yukina
2011	Sekai-ichi Hatsukoi 2	Kō Yukina
2011	Uta no Prince-sama	Camus
2011	Yu-Gi-Oh! Zexal	Orbital 7, Ukyo Kitano
2012	Amagami SS+ plus	Junichi Tachibana
2012	Another	Naoya Teshigawara
2012	Ginga e Kickoff!!	Akira Kagerua
2012	Katayoku no Khronos Gear	Musashi Miyamoto
2012	Suki-tte Ii na yo.	Kai Takemura
2012	The Ambition of Oda Nobuna	Joaqim "Ryuusa Konishi" Konishi
2012	The Familiar of Zero F	Madderf
2012	Yu-Gi-Oh! Zexal II	Orbitial 7, Ukyo Kitano
2013	Ace of Diamond	Masatoshi Harada
2013	Brothers Conflict	Natsume Asahina
2013	Death Billiards	Decim
2013	Hakkenden: Touhou Hakken Ibun	Genpachi Inukai
2013	Karneval	Kiharu
2013	Log Horizon	Naotsugu
2013	Pretty Rhythm: Rainbow Live	Hiro Hayami
2013	Uta no Prince-sama Maji Love 2000% (Season 2)	Camus - Quartet Night
2013	Yowamushi Pedal	Juichi Fukutomi
2014	Akatsuki no Yona	Son Hak
2014	Baby Steps	Ryō Ōbayashi
2014	Black Butler: Book of Circus	Charles Phipps
2014	Dragonar Academy	Raymond Kirkland
2014	Haikyū!!	Makoto Shimada
2014	Log Horizon 2	Naotsugu
2014	Lord Marksman and Vanadis	Gerard Augre
2014	M3: The Dark Metal	Iwato Namito
2014	Maken-ki! Two	Takeru Oyama
2014	Tokyo ESP	Tōru Kanze
2014	World Trigger	Reiji Kizaki
2015	Aoharu x Machinegun	Masamune Matsuoka
2015	Baby Steps Season 2	Ryō Ōbayashi
2015	Death Parade	Decim
2015	Durarara!!x2	Nagura
2015	Gangsta.	Yang
2015	God Eater	Brendan Bardell
2015	Mobile Suit Gundam: The Origin	Lino Fernandez
2015	Q Transformer: Saranaru Ninkimono e no Michi	Drift
2015	Seraph of the End	Kureto Hiiragi
2015	Star-Myu: High School Star Musical	Shu Kuga
2015	Uta no Prince-sama Maji Love Revolutions (Season 3)	Camus - Quartet Night
2016	Classicaloid	Franz Schubert
2016	Endride	Gidro
2016	Haven't You Heard? I'm Sakamoto	Morita
2016	Kiznaiver	Hajime Tenga
2016	Mobile Suit Gundam: Iron-Blooded Orphans S2	Isurugi Camich
2016	Occultic;Nine	Takaharu Minase
2016	Saiki Kusuo no Psi-nan	Makoto Teruhashi
2016	Shōnen Maid	Keiichirō Shinozaki
2016	Super Lovers	Haru Kaidou
2016	Tales of Zestiria the X	Oscar Dragonia
2016	The Morose Mononokean	Haruitsuki Abeno
2016	Time Travel Girl	Alexander Graham Bell
2016	Touken Ranbu: Hanamaru	Yamanbagiri Kunihiro
2016	Tsukiuta. The Animation	Haru Yayoi
2016	Twin Star Exorcists	Ryougo Nagitsuji
2016	Uta no Prince-sama Maji Love Legend Star (Season 4)	Camus - Quartet Night
2016	Yuri!!! on Ice	Michele Crispino
2017	ACCA: 13-ku Kansatsu-ka	Not
2017	Blend S	Dino
2017	Code:Realize ~Sousei no Himegimi~	Arsène Lupin
2017	Drifters	Banzelmashin Shylock VIII
2017	Hitorijime My Hero	Kousuke Ooshiba
2017	Kabukibu!	Tsurani Toomi
2017	Kado - The Right Answer	Satoshi Tsukai
2017	Katsugeki/Touken Ranbu	Yamanbagiri Kunihiro
2017	Kenka Bancho Otome: Girl Beats Boys	Houou Onigashima
2017	Monster Hunter Stories: Ride On	Cryo
2017	Nana Maru San Batsu	Kunimitsu Ōkura
2017	Recovery of an MMO Junkie	Homare Koiwai
2017	Room Mate	Takumi Ashihara
2017	Sengoku Night Blood	Nagahide Niwa
2017	Star-Myu: High School Star Musical 2	Shu Kuga
2017	Super Lovers 2	Haru Kaidou
2017	The King of Fighters: Destiny	Kyo Kusanagi
2017	TsukiPro the Animation	Haru Yayoi (Ep. 6)
2017	Tsurezure Children	Takeru Gouda
2017	Yowamushi Pedal: New Generation	Juichi Fukutomi
2018	After the Rain	Ryosuke Kase
2018	Butlers: Chitose Momotose Monogatari	Akira Tachibana
2018	Caligula	Izuru Minesawa (replacing Yūichirō Umehara from episode 9 to 12)
2018	Cells at Work!	White Blood Cell(Neutrophil)U-1146
2018	Citrus	Shō Aihara
2018	Dame x Prince Anime Caravan	Theo Colton
2018	Doraemon	Condorman, Police Officer
2018	Fairy Tail	Invel Yura
2018	Gakuen Babysitters	Yoshihito Usaida
2018	Gintama.	Enshou (replacing Yuichiro Umehara)
2018	Golden Kamuy 2	Kirawus
2018	Hakata Tonkotsu Ramens	José Martínez
2018	Hakyuu Houshin Engi	Bunchuu
2018	Last Hope	Leon Lau
2018	Mr. Tonegawa: Middle Management Blues	Odagiri
2018	Pazudora	Andō
2018	Rokuhōdō Yotsuiro Biyori	Yakyō Higashigo
2018	The Thousand Musketeers	Ieyasu (replacing Yuichiro Umehara for episodes 1 & 2 only)
2018	That Time I Got Reincarnated as a Slime	Veldora Tempest
2018	Touken Ranbu: Hanamaru 2	Yamanbagiri Kunihiro
2019	Ascendance of a Bookworm	Mark
2019	Dr. Stone	Kinro
2019	Ensemble Stars!	Hokuto Hidaka (replacing Yoshimasa Hosoya)
2019	Fairy Gone	Free Underbar
2019	Fire Force	Konro Sagamiya
2019	JoJo's Bizarre Adventure: Golden Wind	Squalo
2019	Kochoki: Wakaki Nobunaga	Mudai Sadakatsu
2019	Midnight Occult Civil Servants	Kyōichi Sakaki
2019	Namu Amida Butsu!: Rendai Utena	Bonten
2019	Saint Seiya: Saintia Shō	Southern Cross Georg
2019	Stand My Heroes: Piece of Truth	Daisuke Seki
2019	Star-Myu: High School Star Musical 3	Shu Kuga
2019	The Case Files of Lord El-Melloi II: Rail Zeppelin Grace Note	Wills Pelham Codringtion
2019	The Morose Mononokean II	Haruitsuki Abeno
2020	Ascendance of a Bookworm Season 2	Mark
2020	Aware! Meisaku-kun	Announcement, Kappa A, Old Clock
2020	Bungou to Alchemist: Shinpan no Haguruma	Naoya Shiga
2020	Detective Conan	Sunglasses Brother
2020	Dragon Quest: The Adventure of Dai	Crocodine
2020	Drifting Dragons	Mika
2020	Fire Force Season 2	Konro Sagamiya
2020	Haikyu!! To The Top	Makoto Shimada
2020	If My Favorite Pop Idol Made It to the Budokan, I Would Die	Kumasa
2020	Sorcerous Stabber Orphen	Forte
2020	Strike the Blood	Shafrial Ren
2020	Tsukiuta. The Animation 2	Haru Yayoi
2020	Uchitama?! Have you seen my Tama?	Buru Kuramochi
2021	6 Lovers	Riku Kurose
2021	Cells at Work Season 2	Neutrophil (White Blood Cell)
2021	Doraemon	Alien 1 from Dorayaki Planet (Doraemon Birthday Special 2021)
2021	Dr. Stone: Stone Wars	Kinro
2021	HeartCatch Pretty Cure!	Myoudouin Satsuki
2021	I-Chu: Halfway Through the Idol	Issei Todoroki
2021	Log Horizon: Destruction of the Round Table	Naotsugu
2021	My Next Life as a Villainess: All Routes Lead to Doom! X	Cyrus Lanchester
2021	Night Head 2041	Suguru Kakitani
2021	Platinum End	Hajime Sokotani
2021	Sorcerous Stabber Orphen: Battle of Kimluck	Forte
2021	Skate-Leading Stars	Itsuki Kiriyama
2021	Tesla Note	Ryūnosuke Takamatsu
2021	That Time I Got Reincarnated as a Slime Season 2	Veldora Tempest
2021	The Slime Diaries: That Time I Got Reincarnated as a Slime	Veldora Tempest
2021	The Case Study of Vanitas	Olivier
2021	Tsukimichi: Moonlit Fantasy	Tsukuyomi-no-Mikoto
2021	WAVE!! Surfing Yappe!!	Masaki Hinaoka
2021	World Trigger Season 2	Reiji Kizaki
2021	World Trigger Season 3	Reiji Kizaki
2021	Yusei High School Astronomy Club	Eiji Fujisaki
2022	Aoashi	Kōji Satake
2022	Ascendance of a Bookworm Season 3	Mark
2022	Bibliophile Princess	Rei
2022	Bleach: Thousand-Year Blood War	NaNaNa Najahkoop
2022	Delicious Party Pretty Cure	Rosemary
2022	Dr. Stone: Ryusui	Kinro
2022	Golden Kamuy Season 4	Kirawus
2022	In the Land of Leadale	Elineh
2022	Love of Kill	Hou
2022	Miss Shachiku and the Little Baby Ghost	"Cute" voice of the week (episode 1)
2022	Orient	Tatsuomi Uesugi
2022	RWBY: Ice Queendom	Sun Wukong
2022	Salaryman's Club	Tooru Usuyama
2022	Shinobi no Ittoki	Hayato Goshogawara
2022	Shoot! Goal to the Future	Ryū Sahara
2022	Skeleton Knight in Another World	Arc
2022	The Yakuza's Guide to Babysitting	Tōichirō Aoi
2022	Tomodachi Game	Sergeant Manabu
2022	Ultraman Season 2	Tar/Kotaro Higashi/Ultraman Taro
2022	Uncle from Another World	Ricardo Markfeld
2022	Vazzrock the Animation	Haru Yayoi
2022	Yowamushi Pedal: Limit Break	Juichi Fukutomi
2023	Bleach: Thousand-Year Blood War - The Separation	NaNaNa Najahkoop
2023	Captain Tsubasa: Junior Youth Arc	Commentator
2023	Chronicles of an Aristocrat Reborn in Another World	Seth
2023	Dr. Stone: New World	Kinro
2023	Nier: Automata Ver1.1a	Watts
2023	Ragna Crimson	Isaac Stern
2023	Rurouni Kenshin: Meiji Kenkaku Romantan	Dankichi Asahiyama
2023	Saint Cecilia and Pastor Lawrence	Gieselbert
2023	Stand My Heroes: Warmth of Memories	Daisuke Seki
2023	Sugar Apple Fairy Tale	Hugh Mercury
2023	The Great Cleric	Grulga
2023	The Marginal Service	Eddie Snow
2023	Ultraman Final	Kotaro Higashi
2023	You Were Experienced, I Was Not: Our Dating Story	Shūgo Sekiya
2024	A Terrified Teacher at Ghoul School!	Makoto Yamazaki
2024	As a Reincarnated Aristocrat, I'll Use My Appraisal Skill to Rise in the World Season 2	Ruper Louston
2024	Bleach: Thousand-Year Blood War - The Conflict	NaNaNa Najahkoop
2024	Chillin' in Another World with Level 2 Super Cheat Powers	Gholl
2024	Fluffy Paradise	Shinki, Mori Oni, Hobgoblin
2024	Quality Assurance in Another World	Yamanaka
2024	Tales of Wedding Rings	The Abyss King, Ghost
2024	That Time I Got Reincarnated as a Slime Season 3	Veldora Tempest
2024	The Unwanted Undead Adventurer	Wilfried Rucker
2024	The Weakest Tamer Began a Journey to Pick Up Trash	Barksby
2024	Tokyo Override	Spoke
2024	Touken Ranbu Kai: Kyoden Moyuru Honnōji	Yamanbagiri Kunihiro
2024	Viral Hit	Mangi Hwang
2024	Why Does Nobody Remember Me in This World?	Alfreya
2025	A Wild Last Boss Appeared!	Megrez
2025	Binan Kōkō Chikyū Bōei-bu Haikara!	Sutoreito Domeki
2025	Black Butler: Emerald Witch Arc	Charles Phipps
2025	Catch Me at the Ballpark!	Mitsuteru Tsubaki
2025	Detective Conan	Akito Haga
2025	Dr. Stone: Science Future	Kinro
2025	Fate/Grand Order: You've Lost Ritsuka Fujimaru Season 3	Taigong Wang
2025	Fire Force Season 3	Konro Sagamiya
2025	My Happy Marriage	Mukadeyama
2025	Onmyo Kaiten Re:Birth Verse	Kunihito
2025	Sakamoto Days	Joichiro Kaji
2025	See You Tomorrow at the Food Court	Game Character
2025	Solo Leveling: Arise from the Shadow	Kenzo Tanaka
2025	Star Wars: Visions Volume 3	Master
2025	Tales of Wedding Rings Season 2	The Abyss King, Ring King
2025	The Apothecary Diaries 2nd Season	Sazen
2025	The Dark History of the Reincarnated Villainess	Yamato Hydrangea
2025	UniteUp! Uni:Birth	Yuuhi Tamiya
2025	Who Made Me a Princess	Claude de Alger Obelia
2025	Wind Breaker Season 2	Saku Mizuki
2025	With Vengeance, Sincerely, Your Broken Saintess	Thallid Zied-Crown
2025	Yaiba: Samurai Legend	Goemon Ishikawa
2026	Ascendance of a Bookworm: Adopted Daughter of an Archduke	Mark
2026	Dead Account	Korekiyo Nanzou
2026	Fire Force Season 3 Part 2	Konro Sagamiya
2026	Golden Kamuy Final Season	Kirawus
2026	Red River	Ilbani
2026	Skeleton Knight in Another World Season 2	Arc
2026	That Time I Got Reincarnated as a Slime Season 4	Veldora Tempest
2026	The Daily Life of a Part-time Torturer	Isua
2026	The Other World's Books Depend on the Bean Counter	Aresh Indrak
2027	A Pen, Handcuffs, and a Common-Law Marriage	Eiji Kirisame
2027	The Remarried Empress	Sovieshu
TBA	A Wild Last Boss Appeared! Season 2	Megrez
TBA	Yona of the Dawn Season 2	Hak

=== Anime films ===
Year	Title	Role
2010	Metal Fight Beyblade vs the Sun: Sol Blaze, the Scorching Hot Invader	Helios
2012	Library War: The Wings of Revolution	Atsushi Dōjō
2013	Death Billiards	Decim
2014	Yowamushi Pedal Re:RIDE	Juichi Fukutomi
2014	Kuro no Su - Chornus	Shinobu Tōjō
2015	Cyborg 009 Vs. Devilman	Jet Link/002
2015	Yowamushi Pedal Re:Road	Juichi Fukutomi
2016	King of Prism by PrettyRhythm	Hiro Hayami
2016	Yowamushi Pedal Spare Bike	Juichi Fukutomi
2017	Fairy Tail: Dragon Cry	Invel Yura
2017	Black Butler: Book of the Atlantic	Charles Phipps
2017	King of Prism: Pride the Hero	Hiro Hayami
2018	K: Seven Stories SIDE:BLUE ~Tenrō no Gotoku~	Gen Shioutsu
2019	Trinity Seven: Heavens Library & Crimson Lord	Abyss Trinity
2019	King of Prism: Shiny Seven Stars	Hiro Hayami
2019	Uta no Prince Sama Maji Love Kingdom	Camus
2019	Trinity Seven the Movie: The Eternal Library and the Alchemist Girl	Abyss Trinity
2020	King of Prism All Stars: Prism Show Best 10	Hiro Hayami
2020	Hataraku Saibō!! Saikyō no Teki, Futatabi. Karada no Naka wa "Chō" Ōsawagi!	Neutrophil (White Blood Cell)
2020	WAVE!! Surfing Yappe!!	Masaki Hinaoka
2022	Eiga Delicious Party♡Precure Yume Miru ♡ Okosama Lunch	Rosemary
2022	That Time I Got Reincarnated as a Slime the Movie: Scarlet Bond	Veldora Tempest
2022	Toku Touken Ranbu: Hanamaru ~Setsugetsuka~ Yuki no Maki	Yamanbagiri Kunihiro
2022	Toku Touken Ranbu: Hanamaru ~Setsugetsuka~ Tsuki no Maki	Yamanbagiri Kunihiro
2022	Toku: Touken Ranbu: Hanamaru ~Setsugetsuka~ Hana no Maki	Yamanbagiri Kunihiro
2024	Haikyu!! Movie: Battle of the Garbage Dump	Makoto Shimada
2024	Inazuma Eleven the Movie: Prologue to the New Heroes	Tomobe Jin
2024	King of Prism: Dramatic Prism.1	Hiro Hayami
2024	Rabbits Kingdom The Movie	Haru Yayoi
2024	Touken Ranbu Dо̄den -Chikashi Samuraira Umonora-	Yamanbagiri Kunihiro
2025	King of Prism: Your Endless Call - Mi~nna Kirameki! Prism☆Tours	Hiro Hayami
2025	Uta no☆Prince-sama♪ Movie: Maji Love Quartet Night-hen	Camus
2026	That Time I Got Reincarnated as a Slime the Movie: Tears of the Azure Sea	Veldora Tempest

=== Tokusatsu ===
Year	Title	Role	Episode
2010	Tensou Sentai Goseiger	Luview Alien Kurasunīgo of 5000 °C	10
2010	Kamen Rider OOO	Kamakiri Yummy	1
2019	Kishiryu Sentai Ryusoulger	Gunjoji	43 -

=== Live-action film ===
Year	Title	Role
2018	The Travelling Cat Chronicles	Toramaru (voice)

=== Video games ===
Year	Title	Role
2004	Empire Thousand Wars	Shiroreijin
2009	VitaminZ	Fuwa Chise
2010	Clock Zero ~ One Second to the End ~	Riichiro Kano / Wanderer
2010	Nise no Chigiri	Shuuya
2010	VitaminZ Revolution	Fuwa Chise
2011	Akazukin to Mayoi no Mori	Nightmare
2011	Clock Zero ~ One Second of the End ~ Portable	Riichiro Kano / Wanderer
2011	Hanaoni ~Koi Someru Toki Towa no Shirushi~	Kaki Kitou
2011	Nise no Chigiri Beyond Memories	Shuuya
2012	Street Fighter X Tekken	Hwoarang
2012	Brothers Conflict: Passion Pink	Natsume Asahina
2012	Uta No Prince-Sama Debut!	Camus
2013	Brothers Conflict: Brilliant Blue	Natsume Asahina
2013	Ken ga Kimi	Mitsuaki Kurobane
2013	Seishun Hajimemashita!	Amane Usaki
2013	Shin Megami Tensei IV	Issachar
2013	Uta No Prince-Sama All Star	Camus
2013	Uta No Prince-Sama Music 2	Camus
2013	VitaminZ Graduation	Fuwa Chise
2013	VitaminZ Revolution	Fuwa Chise
2014	Code:Realize ~Sousei no Himegimi~	Arsène Lupin
2014	Code: Realize ~ Sousei no Utahime ~	Arsène Lupin
2014	Lost Dimension	Zenji Maeda
2014	Majou Ou	Atlas Leavis
2014	Senjou no Waltz	Abel
2015	100 Sleeping Princes	Rubell
2015	Clock Zero ~ One Second of the End ~ ExTime	Riichirou Kanou/Wanderer
2015	Dragon Ball Xenoverse	Time Patroller (Male 4)
2015	Dame x Prince	Theo
2015	Exist Archive: The Other Side of the Sky	Todoroki Namero
2015	I-Chu	Issei Todoroki
2015	Possession Magenta	Otosei
2015	Taisho x Alice	Akazukin (Red Riding Hood)
2015	Touken Ranbu ONLINE	Yamanbagiri Kunihiro
2016	Bungo to Alchemist	Naoya Shiga
2016	Dragon Ball Xenoverse 2	Time Patroller
2016	Onmyōji	Ōtengu
2016	Stand My Heroes	Daisuke Seki
2016	Tales of Berseria	Oscar Dragonia
2016	The King of Fighters XIV	Kyo Kusanagi
2016	Uta No Prince-Sama Music 3	Camus
2016	Collar × Malice	Keisuke Sanjou
2017	Akane-sasu Sekai de Kimi to Utau	Nakatomi no Kamatari
2017	Code: Realize ~ The Miracle of Silver ~	Arsène Lupin
2017	Xenoblade Chronicles 2	Gorg
2017	Diabolic Lovers Lost Eden	Kino
2017	Ensemble Stars!	Hokuto Hidaka
2017	Fire Emblem Heroes	Lif
2017	King of Prism Prism Rush! Live	Hiro Hayami
2017	Sengoku Night Blood	Niwa Nagahide
2017	The Cinderella Contract	Prince Asena Bin Talip Al-Sultan (Asena)
2017	The Legend of Heroes: Trails of Cold Steel III	Ash Carbide
2017	Twin Star Exorcists	Ryogo Nagitsuji
2017	Tsukitomo. -TSUKIUTA.12 memories-	Haru Yayoi
2017	Uta no Prince-Sama Shining Live	Camus
2017	Xenoblade Chronicles 2	Yuo
2018	Food Fantasy	Cassata, Beer
2018	Granblue Fantasy	Wulf
2018	The King of Fighters All Star	Kyo Kusanagi, Luke
2018	The Legend of Heroes: Trails of Cold Steel IV	Ash Carbide
2018	Collar × Malice Unlimited	Keisuke Sanjo
2019	Diabolik Lovers: Chaos Lineage	Kino
2019	Saint Seiya Awakening	Kraken Issak
2019	SinoALICE	Hamelin
2019	The King of Fighters for Girls	Kyo Kusanagi
2020	Dragon Quest: The Adventure of Dai: Cross Blade	Crocodine
2020	Ensemble Stars !! Basic / Music	Hokuto Hidaka
2020	Genshin Impact	Zhongli
2020	The Legend of Heroes: Trails into Reverie	Ash Carbide
2021	Dragon Quest: The Adventure of Dai: -The Bonds of the Soul-	Crocodine
2021	Lover Pretend	Riku Nishijima
2021	That Time I Got Reincarnated as a Slime: The Demon King & The Founding Dragon	Veldora Tempest
2021	The Thousand Musketeers	Fall
2021	Wave!! Wave Riding Boys	Masaki Hinaoka
2021	Street Fighter V	Luke
2021	Fate/Grand Order	Jiang Ziya
2022	Atelier Sophie 2: The Alchemist of the Mysterious Dream	Olias Enders
2022	Cookie Run: Kingdom	Wildberry Cookie
2022	Dream Meister and the Recollected Black Fairy	Daste
2022	Sentimental Photography	Emperor Enjoji
2022	Atelier Sophie 2: The Alchemist of the Mysterious Dream	Orias Enders
2022	The King of Fighters XV	Kyo Kusanagi
2022	Touken Ranbu Musou	Yamanbagiri Kunihiro
2022	Xenoblade Chronicles 3	Isurd
2022	Tactics Ogre: Reborn	Denam Pavel
2023	Street Fighter 6	Luke
2023	Persona 5 Tactica	Toshiro Kasukabe
2023	Fate/Samurai Remnant	Zheng Chenggong
2023	TEVI	Cyril
2026	Arknights: Endfield	Wulfgard

=== Drama CDs ===
Year	Title	Role
2007	Yume Musubi Ko Musubi	Shunpei
2008	Café Latte Rhapsody	Bartender/Bookstore Clerk
2009	Elektel Delusion	Shunpei
2009	Rush!	Hideki Kondo
2009	Punch Up! 2	Yuuya Fukatsu
2009	TV-kun no Kimochi	Michitaka Murayama
2009	Wonderful Days?	Ray
2010	Yandere Heaven	Sakae
2010	Yuuutsu na Asa	Shouichirou Ishizaki
2010	Punch Up! 3	Yuuya Fukatsu
2010	Elektel Delusion: Oubosha Zen'in Service	Shunpei
2010	Me wo tojite 3 byou	Hiroto Kaji
2010	Nessa no Rakuen	Hakim
2010	Koisuru Bambino	Iba
2010	Steal! Series 1: 1st Mission	Ryouichi Nikaidou
2010	Steal! Series 2: 2nd Mission	Ryouichi Nikaidou
2011	Boku no Senpai	Chihaya Najima
2011	Ameiro Paradox	Kaburagi Motoharu
2011	Samejima-kun to Sasahara-kun	Samejima
2011	Steal! Series 3 Part 1: Koisuru	Ryouichi Nikaidou
2011	Steal! Series 3 Part 2: Aisare White Day	Ryouichi Nikaidou
2011	Punch Up! 4	Yuuya Fukatsu
2011	Yuuutsu na Asa 2	Shouichirou Ishizaki
2012	Yuuutsu na Asa 3	Shouichirou Ishizaki
2012	Yoromeki Banchou	Narumi
2012	Yume no You na Hanashi	Kazuya Sawamura
2012	Elektel Delusion 3	Shunpei
2012	Iberiko Buta to Koi to Tsubaki	Genji
2012	Ameiro Paradox 2	Kaburagi Motoharu
2012	Sekai-ichi Hatsukoi	Kō Yukina
2012	Ringo ni Hachimistsu	Komano
2013	Risou no Koibito	Riku Kiuchi
2013	NightS - Reply	Takami
2013	Brothers Conflict	Natsume Asahina
2013	Puchitto Hajiketa	Noshiro
2014	Ten Count 1	Kurose Riku
2015	Kuroneko Kareshi no Askbikata	Kagami Keichi
2016	Ameiro Paradox 3	Kaburagi Motoharu
2016	Code:Realize ~Sousei no Himegimi~	Arsène Lupin
2016	Escape Journey	Taichi Hase
2016	Ten Count 3	Kurose Riku
2016	Ten Count 4	Kurose Riku
2016	Yuuutsu na Asa 4	Shouichirou Ishizaki
2017	Ten Count 5	Kurose Riku
2017	Yuuutsu na Asa 5	Shouichirou Ishizaki
2017	Kashikomarimashita, Destiny (side:Butler)	Kudo Yuuto
2018	Kashikomarimashita, Destiny -Answer-	Kudo Yuuto
2018	Ten Count 6	Kurose Riku
2019	Yuuutsu na Asa 5	Shouichirou Ishizaki
?	Hakuu Series 3: Awayuki	Takai

=== Dubbing ===
==== Live-action ====
Voice Dub For	Title	Role	Original date
Andrew Garfield	The Amazing Spider-Man	Peter Parker/Spider-Man	2012
Andrew Garfield	The Amazing Spider-Man 2	Peter Parker/Spider-Man	2014
Andrew Garfield	Hacksaw Ridge	Desmond Doss	2016
Andrew Garfield	The Eyes of Tammy Faye	Jim Bakker	2021
Andrew Garfield	Spider-Man: No Way Home	Peter Parker/Spider-Man	2021
Colin Hanks	11:14	Mark	2003
Paul Dano	Being Flynn	Nick Flynn	2012
Ben Milliken	Blue Crush 2	Tim	2011
Lee Hong-gi	Bride of the Century	Choi Kang-joo	2014
Douglas Spain	Brothers & Sisters	Brian Garcia	2011
Sam Claflin	Charlie's Angels	Alexander Brok	2019
Ben Whishaw	Cloud Atlas	Robert Frosbisher	2012
Nicholas Irons	The Conclave	Prospero Colonna	2006
	Code 46	Nabil	2003
James Kirk	Confessions of a Sociopathic Social Climber	Sebastian	2005
Jeremy Rowley	Cougar Club	Karl	2007
Kim Jung-hyun	Crash Landing on You	Gu Seung-jun	2019-2020
Travis Brorsen	Days of Darkness	Steve	2007
Ivaylo Geraskov	Dragon Storm	Gelmaro	2004
Myles Pollard	Drift	Andy Kelly	2013
Blake Jenner	The Edge of Seventeen	Darian	2016
Cameron Dallas	Expelled	Felix O'Neil	2014
Eli Brown	Gossip Girl	Otto Bergmann IV	2021-2023
Alexander Ludwig	Guy Ritchie's The Covenant	Staff Sgt. Declan O'Brady	2023
Greg Fleet	The Hard Word	Tony	2002
Jamison Jones	He Was a Quiet Man	Scott Harper	2007
Sam Claflin	The Hunger Games: Catching Fire	Finnick Odair	2013
Sam Claflin	The Hunger Games: Mockingjay – Part 1	Finnick Odair	2014
Sam Claflin	The Hunger Games: Mockingjay – Part 2	Finnick Odair	2015
Drew Roy	iCarly	Griffin	2009-2010
Jessie Usher	Independence Day: Resurgence	Dylan Hiller	2016
Carlos Cuevas	Leonardo	Salaì	2021
Bradley James	Merlin	Arthur Pendragon	2008-2012
Jack Reynor	Midsommar	Christian Hughes	2019
Freddie Stroma	Peacemaker	Adrian Chase / Vigilante	2022-2025
Azim Rizk	Power Rangers Megaforce	Jake Holling	2013
Kip Martain	Pray for Morning	Rand	2006
Edward Yankie	Punisher: War Zone	Mike	2008
Henry Hopper	Restless	Enoch Brae	2011
Logan Miller	Scouts Guide to the Zombie Apocalypse	Carter Grant	2015
Rogelio Ramos	Sex and the City	Paulo	2008
Stephen Graham	Snatch (2017 Blu-Ray edition)	Tommy	2000
Alden Ehrenreich	Solo: A Star Wars Story	Han Solo	2018
	Species	Matt	1995
Chris Schellenger	They Found Hell	Peter	2015
Tom Brooke	Thorne: Scaredy Cat	Martin Palmer	2010
Choi Woo-shik	Train to Busan	Yong-guk	2016
George MacKay	True History of the Kelly Gang	Ned Kelly	2000
Yang Yang	Vanguard	Lei Zhenyu	2020
Christopher B. Duncan	Veronica Mars	Clarence Wiedman	2005-2007
Tom Hughes	Victoria	Prince Albert	2016-2019
Jonathan Levit	War of the Worlds 2: The Next Wave	Gorman	2008

==== Animation ====
Title	Role	Original date
All Saints Street	Damao	2022
Randy Cunningham: 9th Grade Ninja	Randy Cunningham	2012-2015
RWBY	Sun Wukong	2013-2024
Seoul Station	Ki-woong	2016
Total Drama	Duncan (Total Drama Action–Total Drama All-Stars)/Geoff (Total Drama Island–Total Drama World Tour; Total Drama Presents: The Ridonculous Race)	2007-2014; 2023-present
Vic the Viking	Raif	2013-2014
Young Justice	Wally West/Kid Flash	2010-2013; 2019-2022
