= Chihiro Amano =

Japanese film director and screenwriter

- Born: July 30, 1982 (age 43); Japan
- Occupations: Film director Screenwriter
- Years active: 2009 –
- Website: http://chihiroamano.web.fc2.com/home.html

Chihiro Amano (天野千尋, Amano Chihiro) is a Japanese film director and screenwriter.

== Life and career ==
Amano was born on July 30, 1982. After five years working in the corporate world, she turned to film and made her debut with the 2009 Sayonara Muffler which was shown at the Cineastes Organization Osaka EX and other festivals. Her second film Cast the Die! competed at the 2010 PIA Film Festival. Amano's 2011 film Snipping Girl made its international premier at the 12th Japan Filmfest Hamburg in May 2011 and competed at the 2011 PIA Film Festival.

In 2012, she released the short The Confessions of Figaro about four junior high school boys curious about sex. The film won the Grand Prize Award and the Audience Award at the Shitamachi Comedy Film Festival in Tokyo and the Runner-up Prize at the 2012 Aichi International Women's Film Festival. It was also screened at the 15th International Women's Film Festival in Seoul, South Korea. Amano's 2012 short fantasy Neverland in Gamagori about an eleven-year-old boy's adventure debuted at the 4th Okinawa International Movie Festival.

Her 2013 film depicting a family drama, All Is Vanity, was shown at the Yubari International Fantastic Film Festival.

Amano is one of only a handful of women directors in Japan. In a 2012 interview she said that she has had to take a part-time job to support her filmmaking but her "Striving to get ahead professionally" is probably the best way to "pave the way for more female directors in Japan." Amano made her commercial film debut with the May 2014 No Touching At All based on Kou Yoneda's "boys' love" manga of the same name.

== Filmography ==
- Sayonara Muffler (さよならマフラー, Sayonara mafurā), 44 min. (2009)
- Cast the Die (賽ヲナゲロ, Sai onagero), 66 min. (2009)
- Snipping Girl (チョッキン堪忍袋, Chokkin kanninbukuro), 33 min. (2011)
- Confessions of Figaro (フィガロの告白, Figaro no kokuhaku), 22 min. (2012)
- Yuku hito, kuru hito (ゆく人、くる人), 56 min. (2012)
- Koi wa parēdo no yō ni (恋はパレードのように), 50 min. (2012)
- Neverland in Gamagori (ガマゴリ・ネバーアイランド, Gamagori nebāairando), 35 min. (2012)
- All Is Vanity (色即是空, Shikisokuzekū), 22 min. (2013)
- No Touching At All (どうしても触れたくない), 84 min. (May 2014)
- Hokago Lost (放課後ロスト, Hokago Rosuto), "Little Trip" segment of a 3-part film (August 2014)
- Mrs. Noisy (2019)
- Sato and Sato (2025)
- Magical Secret Tour (2026)
