= No Touching At All =

Japanese manga by Kou Yoneda

- Cover of the Japanese version, first released on September 18, 2008

どうしても触れたくない (Dōshitemo Furetakunai)
- Genre: Boys' love, romance, drama
- Manga
- Written by: Kou Yoneda
- Published by: Taiyoh Tosho
- English publisher: NA: Digital Manga Publishing
- Imprint: Million Comics Craft Series
- Magazine: Craft
- Original run: 2007 – 2008
- Volumes: 1
- Manga

Even So, I Will Love You Tenderly
- Written by: Kou Yoneda
- Published by: Taiyoh Tosho
- English publisher: NA: Digital Manga Publishing
- Imprint: Million Comics Craft Series
- Magazine: Craft
- Original run: 2008 – 2013
- Volumes: 1
- Live-action film
- Directed by: Chihiro Amano
- Produced by: Takeshi Katayama; Mika Nakamura
- Written by: Natsuko Takahashi
- Music by: Swich
- Released: May 31, 2014
- Runtime: 84 minutes

No Touching At All (Japanese: どうしても触れたくない, Hepburn: Dōshitemo Furetakunai) is a Japanese manga written and illustrated by Kou Yoneda. No Touching At All was serialized in the quarterly boys' love manga magazine Craft from 2007 to 2008. The book was followed up with a one-volume sequel spin-off titled Even So, I Will Love You Tenderly (それでも、やさしい恋をする, Soredemo, Yasashii Koi o Suru). A live-action film adaptation of No Touching At All was released on May 31, 2014.

== Plot ==
On the first day of his new job, Toshiaki Shima becomes trapped in an elevator with a hungover man, who turns out to be his new boss, Yosuke Togawa. Togawa's brash and flippant behavior irritates Shima, but he soon becomes drawn to him when Togawa becomes supportive of him. However, Shima is reluctant to act on his feelings after his previous relationship with a male co-worker, which resulted in him quitting after his workplace discovered his secret. Meanwhile, Togawa must confront the traumatic past of his family.

== Characters ==
Toshiaki Shima (嶋俊亜紀, Shima Toshiaki)
Voiced by: Kenji Nojima (drama CD); portrayed by: Kosuke Yonehara (film)
Shima is a 26-year-old office employee who identifies as gay. He was ostracized by his previous co-workers after they discovered he was in a relationship with another male colleague, and because of this, he keeps to himself.
Yosuke Togawa (外川陽介, Togawa Yōsuke)
Voiced by: Hideo Ishikawa (drama CD); portrayed by: Masashi Taniguchi (film)
Togawa is a 29-year-old section manager and Shima's boss, who is also straight. While brash and outspoken, he is seen as friendly and reliable by his peers, and he acts as Shima's confidant. As a child, his family died from a fire.
Ryo Onoda (小野田良, Onoda Ryō)
Voiced by: Toshiyuki Morikawa (drama CD); portrayed by: Sho Tomita (film)
Onoda is a 28-year-old office employee and Shima's co-worker, who eventually gets promoted to section manager after Togawa is transferred. He is supportive towards Shima and questions himself when he falls in love with him. After accepting Shima and Togawa's relationship, he starts falling in love with his friend, Deguchi, and they begin a relationship.

== Media ==
=== Manga ===
No Touching At All is written and illustrated by Kou Yoneda. It was serialized in the quarterly boys' love manga magazine anthology Craft from 2007 to 2008. The chapters were later released in one bound volume by Taiyoh Tosho under the Million Comics Craft Series imprint. A drama CD adaptation by B's-Garden, a division of Taiyoh Tosho, was released on March 27, 2009.

In October 2009, Digital Manga Publishing announced at Yaoi-Con that they were distributing the book in English under the Juné imprint. Digital Manga Publishing restocked the book in 2015 and 2016 under a print-on-demand model that resulted a misprint. They plan to re-release the book with a new English translation in Q3 2023.

No.	Title	Original release date	English release date
1	No Touching At All; Dōshitemo Furetakunai (どうしても触れたくない)	September 15, 2008; 978-4-8130-5147-3	November 30, 2010; 978-1-5697-0185-0
1. Chapter 1; 2. Chapter 2; 3. Chapter 3; 4. Chapter 4; 5. Chapter 5; 6. Chapter 6; 7. "Weekend" (週末, Shūmatsu); 8. "Section Manager Onoda is Depressed" (小野田課長は憂鬱, Onoda-kachō wa Yūutsu); 9. "Before Dawn" (夜明け前, Yoake Mae)

==== Sequel ====
The series was followed up with a one-volume spin-off titled Even So, I Will Love You Tenderly (それでも、やさしい恋をする, Soredemo, Yasashii Koi o Suru), which focused on side characters Onoda and Deguchi. In 2014, Digital Manga Publishing distributed the book in English under the Juné imprint and also reprinted No Touching At All to help readers understand the story's background. A drama CD adaptation was released on October 31, 2014.

No.	Title	Original release date	English release date
1	Even So, I Will Love You Tenderly; Soredemo, Yasashii Koi o Suru (それでも、やさしい恋をする)	April 1, 2014; 978-4-8130-3045-4	October 1, 2015; 978-1-56970-342-7
1. Chapter 1; 2. Chapter 2; 3. Chapter 3; 4. Chapter 4; 5. Chapter 5; 6. Chapter 6; 7. "After 9 Hours"; 8. "After 10 Hours"; 9. "A World With Color" (色のある世界, Iro no Aru Sekai); 10. "A World With Color 2" (色のある世界2, Iro no Aru Sekai 2); 11. "Kind Lies Don't Bear Fruit" (やさしいうそはみのらない, Yasashii Uso wa Minoranai)

=== Film adaptation ===
In January 2014, vol. 59 of Craft announced a live-action film adaptation starring Kosuke Yonehara from Run&Gun and Masashi Taniguchi. The film was directed by Chihiro Amano as her first feature film, with the script supervised by Natsuko Takahashi. The film was shot in five days. It was released on May 31, 2014. The film was released on DVD and Blu-ray on October 21, 2015, with a special CD featuring artwork by Kou Yoneda.

== Reception ==
No Touching At All was ranked #3 as one of the best boys love stories in Kono BL ga Yabai! 2009 Fujoshi Edition.
