= Kiss Blue =

Japanese manga series

キスブルー (Kisuburū)
- Genre: Romance, Yaoi
- Manga
- Written by: Keiko Kinoshita
- Published by: Taiyoh Tosho
- English publisher: NA: Digital Manga Publishing
- Magazine: Craft
- Original run: April 1, 2006 – July 2, 2007
- Volumes: 2

Kiss Blue (キスブルー, Kisuburū) is a Japanese manga written and illustrated by Keiko Kinoshita. The manga is licensed in English by Digital Manga Publishing, which released the first volume in July 2008 and the second volume in November 2010.

== Reception ==
Leroy Douresseaux, writing for Comic Book Bin, enjoyed the pacing of the first volume, feeling it permitted "the reader to get to know the characters" well. He described Kinoshita's art as "soft and evocative". Patricia Beard appreciated that the book was "angst-free", instead going for an "understated" mood. Holly Ellingwood, writing for Active Anime, described the story as "poignant", and stated that although she had to get used to Kinoshita's art style when reading You and Harujion, Ellingwood now appreciated Kinoshita's "clean art and its unique expressiveness".
