= ARCAM Corporation =

Fictional company in the Spriggan manga series

- Spriggan organization

In-universe information
- Other names: ARCAM Foundation; Rockefeller II
- Type: International research foundation
- Founded: In-universe
- Location: New York City, United States
- Leader: Tea Flatte
- Purpose: Protection and containment of ancient artifacts
- Affiliations: ARCAM Private Army; Spriggans
- Native name: アーカム財団

The ARCAM Corporation (アーカム・財団, Aakamu Saitan) or AC, by its initials in the Spriggan manga series, is a fictional international company with its main headquarters in New York in the United States with numerous facilities worldwide, whose mission is to ensure that certain powerful ancient artifacts are protected and sealed off, so that no nation or group in the world can take advantage of them. It maintains its own para-military force called the ARCAM Private Army and has secret agents known as Spriggans (or Strikers).

It is officially known as the ARCAM Foundation. It was also called the Rockefeller II in the Berseker Arc story.

== Fictional history ==
In the manga, ARCAM is founded by Tea Flatte (ティア・フラット), also known as Tea Flatte Arcam, as part of a mission entrusted to her by Merlin. To conceal her identity and connection to the foundation from other ARCAM members and allies, she uses "Tea Flatte" as an alias rather than her full family name.

== Inventions ==
ARCAM has created the following objects for use by their operatives:

- Armored Muscle Suit

- Created by Professor Mayzel after he recently discovered the Omihalcon metal.

- Yu's Omihalcon combat knife

- Professor Mayzel made it on Yu's request, which included an Omihalcon blade and a knuckle guard

- J-15 pistol rounds

- Its ceramic bullet heads can penetrate hard surfaces, like wood, concrete and metal.

== Known ARCAM facilities ==
=== North America ===
==== United States ====
- Main Headquarters - High-risk out-of-place artifacts are stored in their underground safes in New York.
- Research Facility - R&D facility for ARCAM. Was invaded by Program YAMA, turning its personnel against Yu and an ARCAM Special Private Army (ASPA) raiding party.

=== Europe ===
==== Turkey ====
- ARCAM Mt. Ararat Research Facility - Created by ARCAM in order to excavate and study Noah's Ark. The facility was half-destroyed during the raids by Machiner's Platoon troopers.

=== Asia ===
==== India ====
- ARCAM New Delhi Hospital - A survivor of an ASPA unit was treated after they were attacked by a COSMOS squad.
- ARCAM India Research Facility - A Berserker robot was brought into the building before it was activated and attacked many of the establishment's personnel. The complex has been destroyed after its self-destruct mechanism was used, its status unknown if the research facility has been relocated.

==== Japan ====
- ARCAM Japan Branch - Yu Ominae and Oboro are stationed here. The branch includes living quarters for Spriggans and ARCAM's guests and working offices. The facility had been attacked twice before. Both were perpetrated by US Armored Corp. and COSMOS forces.
- ARCAM Tokyo Hospital - Yu was treated here after receiving critical wounds from a COSMOS raid on ARCAM's Japanese branch.

==== Pakistan ====
- ARCAM Islamabad Hospital - Yu was briefed here with several ARCAM Special Private Army operatives after recent attacks on their personnel were reported in Pakistan.

== Known ARCAM Personnel ==
=== Employees ===
- Professor Mayzel
- Ms. Margaret
- Steve Foster
- Henry Garnum
- Eva McMahon
- Akiha Ominae
- Percup Ramdi
- Rie Yamabishi
- Yamamoto

=== ASPA agents ===
- Hudler
- Jimmy Max
- Jack
- John
- Pauel
- Paredes
- Ray

=== Spriggans ===
- Yu Ominae
- Jean Jacquemonde
- Tea Flatte (a.k.a. Tea Flatte Arcam)
- Oboro
