= Wave!! =

Japanese mixed-media project

- Wave!!: Let's Go Surfing!!

WAVE!!〜サーフィンやっぺ!!〜 (Wave!!: Sāfin Yappe!!)
- Created by: Mages
- Anime film series
- Directed by: Takaharu Ozaki
- Written by: Kazuyuki Fudeyasu
- Music by: Akio Dobashi
- Studio: Asahi Production
- Released: October 2, 2020 – October 30, 2020
- Films: 3
- Anime television series
- Directed by: Takaharu Ozaki
- Written by: Kazuyuki Fudeyasu
- Music by: Akio Dobashi
- Studio: Asahi Production
- Licensed by: Crunchyroll
- Original network: TV Tokyo
- Original run: January 12, 2021 – March 30, 2021
- Episodes: 12

Wave!!: Let's Go Surfing!! (Japanese: WAVE!!〜サーフィンやっぺ!!〜, Hepburn: Wave!!: Sāfin Yappe!!) is a Japanese mixed-media project created by Mages. An anime film trilogy produced by Asahi Production was released with three films in October 2020. The films were later recut into a 12-episode television series, which aired from January to March 2021. A mobile game for the series was released on March 1, 2021.

== Characters ==
=== Main characters ===
Masaki Hinaoka (陽岡 マサキ, Hinaoka Masaki)
Voiced by: Tomoaki Maeno
Shō Akitsuki (秋月 ショウ, Akitsuki Shō)
Voiced by: Jin Ogasawara
Nalu Tanaka (田中 ナル, Tanaka Nalu)
Voiced by: Yoshiki Nakajima
Kōsuke Iwana (厳名 コウスケ, Iwana Kōsuke)
Voiced by: Takuya Satō
Yūta Matsukaze (松風 ユータ, Matsukaze Yūta)
Voiced by: Yusuke Shirai
Naoya Kido (木戸 ナオヤ, Kido Naoya)
Voiced by: Shun'ichi Toki
Rikō Fuke (フケ 倫道, Fuke Rikō)
Voiced by: Nobuhiko Okamoto
Sōichirō William Mori (森 ウィリアム聡一郎, Mori William Sōichirō)
Voiced by: Showtaro Morikubo

=== Other characters ===
Hayamichi Inada (五洋ハヤミチ, Inada Hayamichi)
Voiced by: Kohsuke Toriumi

== Media ==
=== Films ===
The project was first announced in October 2018. In May 2020, it was revealed the anime project would be a three-part theatrical film series. It was also announced to be created by Mages and produced by Asahi Production, with direction by Takaharu Ozaki, scripts by Kazuyuki Fudeyasu, character designs by Yomi Sarachi, and music by Akio Dobashi. The films were released on October 2, October 16, and October 30, 2021, respectively. The films' main theme is "Densetsu no Surf Prince", performed by the eight main cast members under the name Naminori Boys.

=== TV series ===
In November 2020, it was announced the film trilogy would be recut into a television series, which aired on TV Tokyo for 12 episodes from January 11 to March 30, 2021. The opening theme for the television series is "Shigeki Surfer Boy" and the ending theme is "One More Chance, One Ocean"; both were performed by Naminori Boys. Internationally, the series is licensed by Crunchyroll outside of Asia.

=== Mobile game ===
A mobile game for the series was announced in August 2019 and released on March 1, 2021. The game ended service on April 6, 2021.

== Reception ==
Caitlin Moore from Anime News Network criticized the series, stating it has a nonsensical story, cheap-looking animation, and poor music.
