= Arkham (disambiguation) =

Arkham is a fictional city in Massachusetts, created by H. P. Lovecraft.

Arkham may also refer to:

- Arkham Asylum, a fictional psychiatric hospital in the DC Comics Universe
- Amadeus Arkham, the fictional founder of Arkham Asylum
- Jeremiah Arkham, the fictional current head of Arkham Asylum
- Arkham (Devil May Cry), one of the main antagonists in the Devil May Cry video game series
- Batman: Arkham, a series of video games set in the Batman universe
- "Arkham" (Gotham), a television episode
- Arkham Intelligence, a public blockchain and cryptocurrency data application
