= Showtaro Morikubo =

Japanese voice actor and singer (born 1974)

- 森久保 祥太郎
- Born: February 25, 1974 (age 52); Hachiōji, Tokyo, Japan
- Education: Tama Art University
- Occupations: Voice actor; singer
- Years active: 1996–present
- Agent: Add9th
- Spouses: Yū Asakawa (m. 2007; div. 2009); Unknown (m. 2014)
- Children: 1
- Website: add9th.co.jp

Showtaro Morikubo (森久保 祥太郎, Morikubo Shōtarō; born February 25, 1974) is a Japanese voice actor and singer who has voiced characters in anime, drama CDs, and video games. He was formerly affiliated with I'm Enterprise, Sigma Seven and VIMS. His most notable roles were Shikamaru Nara from Naruto, Souji Okita in the Hakuouki series, X in the Mega Man X series, Yuusuke Makishima from Yowamushi Pedal, and Yosuke Hanamura from Persona 4.

== Biography ==
Morikubo graduated from Third Junior & Senior High School of Nihon University in 1992, and dropped out of Tama Art University. Before becoming a full-fledged voice actor, he worked at a talent agency, and was recruited by people in the voice acting industry who saw a performance by the Onigiri Skippers, a theater troupe he founded with his seniors from the lab party he attended in elementary school. During his first dubbing session, he made sounds out of flipping pages on the script because he had no experience as a voice actor at that time. The script for the first episode had four pages of long dialogues from the first page, and the sound director said that he would never have let him do the role if he had known he would talk so much. He made his voice acting debut in 1996 as a Mini 4 Fighter in Bakusō Kyōdai Let's & Go!!. The show was supposed to finish in a year, but due to its unexpected popularity, it became a long-running production, and he moved from the agency where he had worked as an actor to a voice acting agency. Since then, he has been active in a variety of fields including animation, games, radio personality, music, and stage.

After working at Sigma Seven, Morikubo moved to VIMS, an office affiliated with Arts Vision.

In 1998, he and voice actor Hideo Ishikawa started a music unit called "Anzu" (derived from the only fruit Morikubo could eat), and in 1999, they formed the band "AN's ALL STARS" with other band members. In August of the same year, he formed the band "Mosquito Milk".

In 2001, Morikubo made his solo debut under the Capcom Suleputer label, and in 2008, he debuted again under the Lantis label. In 2010, he formed "Buzzy→Bee" as a solo project, and in January 2015, he became the second DJ of the long-running bayfm program "KEIYOGINKO POWER COUNTDOWN JAPAN HOT 30".

In 2016, he received the Kei Tomiyama Memorial Award at the 10th Seiyu Awards. In 2020, he received the Personality Award at the 14th Seiyu Awards.

On August 31, 2018, Morikubo left VIMS. On September 1 of the same year, he established Add9th and assumed the position of its representative director.

Morikubo married fellow voice actress Yū Asakawa on February 22, 2007. On January 14, 2009, Asakawa announced on her blog that the two had amicably divorced, citing differences in personality as the reason for the separation.

On July 4, 2014, Morikubo announced on his blog that he had gotten married that week, but expressed a desire to keep details of the marriage private, including the identity of his wife due to her being uninvolved in the entertainment industry. On December 28, 2017, he revealed on an episode of his radio show The BAY☆LINE that he and his wife had welcomed a daughter earlier in the year. The same day, he reaffirmed the news via Twitter.

He and Kentarō Itō call each other their best friend. Morikubo has been in charge of the stage music for the K-Show theater company, which Itō presides over, since its inception.

In August 2024, Morikubo, among others including Hiroshi Tsuchida, participated in a stage reading based on Tomomi Shimizu's manga Inochikake no Shōgen (命かけの証言; lit. Life-Risking Testimonies), themed after the persecution of Uyghurs in China. In March 2025, Morikubo was removed from his roles of the characters Ifa in miHoYo's Genshin Impact and Elysium in Arknights, both of which were developed in mainland China; fans speculated whether the dismissal was due to political reasons stemming from his involvement in the live reading.

== Filmography ==
=== Anime television ===
1996

- After War Gundam X – Willis Aramis
- Bakusō Kyōdai Let's & Go!! – Mini Yon Fighter
- VS Knight Ramune & 40 Fire – Mito Natto

1998

- Blue Submarine No. 6 (OVA) – Verg
- Chosoku Spinner – Shunichi Domoto
- Lodoss to Senki: Eiyū Kishi Den – Cecil
- Sorcerous Stabber Orphen – Orphen

1999

- Excel Saga – Norikuni Iwata
- I'm Gonna Be An Angel – Raphael / Fuyuki Suzuhara
- Sorcerous Stabber Orphen Revenge – Orphen

2000

- Dotto Koni-Chan – High

2001

- Captain Tsubasa – Shingo Aoi
- Cyborg 009 (2001 series) – Cyborg 002 / Jet Link
- Rave Master – Hamrio Musica
- Kai Doh Maru (OVA) – Raiko Minamoto
- Kikaider 01: The Animation (OVA) – Kikaider 01 / Ichiro
- Prétear – Gō
- The Prince of Tennis – Akaya Kirihara

2002

- Cheeky Angel – Gakusan Takao
- GetBackers – Ginji Amano
- Naruto – Shikamaru Nara
- Tokyo Underground – Kashin

2003

- Ikki Tousen – Saji Genpō
- The Boy with the Guitar: Kikaider vs Inazuman (OVA) – Kikaider 01 / Ichiro
- Zatch Bell! – Haruhiko
- Matantei Loki Ragnarok – Thor/Narugami
- Papuwa – Sōji Okita, Tezuka, Umigishi

2004

- Major – Honda/Shigeno Goro
- Melody of Oblivion – Hol
- Samurai Champloo – Hankichi
- Samurai Gun – Ichimatsu
- Detective Conan – Seko Kunishige (Ep 361–362)

2005

- Boku wa Imōto ni Koi o Suru (OVA) – Yori
- Fuyu no Semi (OVA) – Seinoshin Aizawa
- Ichigo 100% – Sawayaka (OVA Character episode 3)

2006

- D.Gray-Man – Jasdero
- Nerima Daikon Brothers – Ichirō
- Yamato Nadeshiko Shichi Henge – Kyohei Takano

2007

- Detective Conan – Kanji Kojima (Ep 476–477)
- Hayate the Combat Butler – Fighter
- Naruto: Shippuden – Shikamaru Nara
- Saiunkoku Monogatari Second Series – Riku Seiga

2008

- Amatsuki – Tsuyukusa

2009

- 11 Eyes – Takahisa Tajima
- Asura Cryin' – Reishiro Saeki

2010

- Bakuman – Koji Makaino, A.K.A. Koogy
- Bleach – Tensa Zangetsu
- Hakuōki series – Okita Souji

2011

- Bakuman 2 – Makaino Koji
- Cardfight!! Vanguard – Taishi Miwa
- Hakuōki Sekkaroku (OVA) – Okita Souji
- Nurarihyon no Mago – Akifusa Keikain
- Persona 4: The Animation – Yosuke Hanamura

2012

- Area no Kishi – Goto Goro
- Daily Lives of High School Boys – Takahiro Matsumoto
- Magi: The Labyrinth of Magic – Sharrkan
- The New Prince of Tennis – Akaya Kirihara

2013

- Magi: The Kingdom of Magic – Sharrkan
- Meganebu! – Shinji Hachimine
- Pretty Rhythm: Rainbow Live – DJ. Coo/Rei Kurokawa
- Samurai Flamenco – Souichi Aoshima
- Uta no Prince-sama Maji Love 2000% – Reiji Kotobuki
- Yowamushi Pedal – Yūsuke Makishima

2014

- Bakumatsu Rock – Kogorō Katsura
- Daitoshokan no Hitsujikai – Ikkei Takamine
- Jinsei – Asano
- Love Stage – Kojirō Ryūzaki
- Persona 4: The Golden Animation – Yosuke Hanamura
- Momo Kyun Sword – Sarugami
- One Piece – Bartolomeo
- Yowamushi Pedal: Grande Road – Yūsuke Makishima

2015

- Classroom Crisis – Kaito Sera
- Cute High Earth Defense Club LOVE! – Kou Kinosaki
- Kamisama Hajimemashita◎ – Ookuninushi
- Uta no Prince-sama Maji Love Revolutions – Reiji Kotobuki
- Diamond no Ace Second Season – Umemiya Seiichi
- Star-Myu – Kyoji Akatsuki
- Miss Monochrome The Animation – DJ Colourful
- Diabolik Lovers More, Blood – Shin Tsukinami

2016

- B-Project: Kodou*Ambitious — Hikaru Osari
- First Love Monster — Tomu Kaneko
- JoJo's Bizarre Adventure: Diamond Is Unbreakable — Akira Otoishi, Red Hot Chili Pepper
- Uta no Prince-sama Maji LOVE Legend Star — Reiji Kotobuki
- Saiki Kusuo no Psi-nan — Uryoku "Kouta Nakanishi" Chouno

2017

- Hand Shakers — Makihara
- Star-Myu: High School Star Musical 2 — Kyoji Akatsuki
- Code: Realize − Guardian of Rebirth — Impey Barbicane
- Boruto: Naruto Next Generations – Shikamaru Nara
- Yowamushi Pedal: New Generation – Yūsuke Makishima
- Crayon Shin-chan Gaiden: Omocha Wars — MC (Ep.9)

2018

- Hakyu Hoshin Engi – Seikyo Doutoku Shinkun
- Yowamushi Pedal: Glory Line – Yūsuke Makishima
- Magical Girl Ore – Konami Yamo
- Isekai Izakaya "Nobu" – Nikolaus
- Thus Spoke Kishibe Rohan (OVA) – Akira Otoshi

2019

- B-Project: Zecchō Emotion – Hikaru Osari
- Namu Amida Butsu!: Rendai Utena – Shakanyorai
- Demon Lord, Retry! – Zero Kirisame
- Ensemble Stars! – Makoto Yūki
- Demon Slayer: Kimetsu no Yaiba – Spider Demon (older brother)
- Dr. Stone – Shamil Volkov
- Black Clover – Zagred (Kotodama Magic Devil)

2020

- Sorcerous Stabber Orphen – Orphen

2021

- I-Chu: Halfway Through the Idol – Kururugi Satsuki
- WAVE!! Surfing Yappe!! – Sōichirō William Mori
- Sorcerous Stabber Orphen: Battle of Kimluck – Orphen
- Tokyo Revengers – Tetta Kisaki
- World Trigger Season 3 – Kazuma Satomi

2022

- In the Land of Leadale – Luvrogue
- Shadowverse Flame – Gentleman
- Eternal Boys – Sawao Soda

2023

- Sorcerous Stabber Orphen: Chaos in Urbanrama – Orphen
- Tōsōchū: The Great Mission – Sōya Tomura
- The Great Cleric – Kōun-sensei
- 16bit Sensation: Another Layer - Toyo Ichigaya

2024

- Ishura – Regnejee the Sunset Wings
- Himitsu no AiPri – MC Aimu
- Acro Trip – Baryū Ōmizo
- Dragon Ball Daima – Gomah
- A Terrified Teacher at Ghoul School! – Ranmaru Karasuma
- Fate/strange Fake – Caster

=== Anime films ===
- Spriggan (1998) – Yu Ominae
- Pokémon: The First Movie (1998) – Young Mewtwo
- Final Fantasy VII Advent Children (2005) – Kadaj
- Fairy Tail the Movie: The Phoenix Priestess (2012) – Dyst
- Hakuōki Dai-isshō Kyoto Ranbu (2013) – Okita Souji
- Hakuōki Dai-nishō Shikon Sōkyū (2014) – Okita Souji
- The Last: Naruto the Movie (2014) – Shikamaru Nara
- Boruto: Naruto the Movie (2015) – Shikamaru Nara
- Mazinger Z: Infinity (2018) – Koji Kabuto
- WAVE!! Surfing Yappe!! (2020) – Sōichirō William Mori
- Ensemble Stars!! Road to Show!! (2022) – Makoto Yūki
- Fate/strange Fake: Whispers of Dawn (2023) – Caster
- Nintama Rantarō: Invincible Master of the Dokutake Ninja (2024) – Zatto Konnamon
- Chimney Town: Frozen in Time (2026)

=== Video games ===
1998

- Super Adventure Rockman – Heatman, Quickman

1999

- Spriggan: Lunar Verse – Yu Ominae

2000

- Grandia II – Ryudo
- Rockman X5 – X, Dynamo
- Sorcerous Stabber Orphen – Orphen

2001

- Apocripha/0 – Seles
- Jak and Daxter: The Precursor Legacy (Japanese dubbed version) – Jak
- Rockman X6 – X, Dynamo

2002

- Tokimeki Memorial Girl's Side – Chiharu Aoki

2003

- Rockman X7 – X

2004

- Jak II (Japanese dubbed version) – Jak

2005

- Memories Off 5 The Unfinished Film – Haruto Kawai
- Shining Force Neo – Max

2006

- Mermaid Prism

2007

- Odin Sphere – Ingway

2008

- 11 Eyes – Takahisa Tajima
- Hakuōki series – Okita Souji
- Persona 4 series – Yosuke Hanamura
- White Knight Chronicles – Osmund

2009

- Jak and Daxter: The Lost Frontier (Japanese dubbed version) – Jak

2010

- NieR RepliCant – Tyrann
- Shin Megami Tensei: Devil Children Black and Red – Kai Setsuna

2011

- Final Fantasy Type-0 – Naghi Minatsuchi
- Tales of Xillia – Ivar

2012

- Tales of Xillia 2 – Ivar
- Uta no Prince-sama Debut – Reiji Kotobuki

2013

- Daitoshokan no Hitsujikai – Ikkei Takamine
- JoJo's Bizarre Adventure: All Star Battle – Akira Otoishi
- Uta no Prince-sama All Star – Reiji Kotobuki
- Uta no Prince-sama Music 2 – Reiji Kotobuki

2014

- Bakumatsu Rock – Kogorō Katsura
- Code:Realize ~Sousei no Himegimi~ – Impey Barbicane
- Gakuen Heaven 2: Double Scramble – Eiji Sonoda

2015

- I-Chu – Kururugi Satsuki
- Ensemble Stars! – Makoto Yuuki
- JoJo's Bizarre Adventure: Eyes of Heaven – Akira Otoishi
- Mighty No. 9 – Aviator
- Uta no Prince-sama All Star After Secret – Reiji Kotobuki
- Yowamushi Pedal High Cadence To Tomorrow – Yūsuke Makishima

2016

- World of Final Fantasy – Cid

2017

- Phantasy Star Online 2 – Elmir

2018

- BlazBlue: Cross Tag Battle – Yosuke Hanamura
- Fire Emblem Heroes – Canas
- Granblue Fantasy – Spinnah, Hamsa

2019

- Saint Seiya Awakening – Saggitarus Aiolos
- Arknights – Elysium (until March 15, 2025)
- Super Robot Wars T – Koji Kabuto

2021

- Rune Factory 5 – Lucas
- Super Robot Wars 30 – Koji Kabuto

2022

- Tactics Ogre: Reborn – Oz Moh Glacius

2023

- Master Detective Archives: Rain Code – Aphex Logan

2024

- Genshin Impact - Ifa (until March 12, 2025)

2025

- Rusty Rabbit – Flemy

=== Drama CDs ===
- ... Virgin Love – Kazuki
- Ao no Kiseki series 5: Persona Non Grata – Majera
- Be My Princess – Prince Keith
- Code:Realize ~Sousei no Himegimi~ as Impey Barbicane
- Gaki no Ryoubun series 2–5, Kaoru Nitta
- Hana-Kimi – Shuichi Nakatsu
- Junjou Boy series 1–2, Ritsu Asaka
- Kageki series 1–5, Shikyuriru/Shiki
- Mars – Rei Kashino
- Sakurazawa vs Hakuhou series 2: Houkengo no Nayameru Kankei – Katsumi Hirose
- SEVENTH HEAVEN – Kanade
- Superior – Exa
- WRITERZ – Hyoma Kiritani

=== Tokusatsu ===
- Zyuden Sentai Kyoryuger Returns: Hundred Years After (2014) – Remorseful Knight Arslevan
- Bakuage Sentai Boonboomger (2024-2025) - Disrace

=== Dubbing ===
==== Live-action ====
- Eddie Peng
  - Tai Chi 0 – Fang Zi Jing
  - Tai Chi Hero – Fang Zi Jing
  - The Bodyguard – Cop #2
  - Call of Heroes – Ma Fung
  - Wu Kong – Sun Wukong
  - The Rescue – Gao Qian
- American Assassin – Mitch Rapp (Dylan O'Brien)
- Avengers: Doomsday – Remy LaBeau / Gambit (Channing Tatum)
- The Batman – Thomas Wayne (Luke Roberts)
- Bones – James Aubrey (John Boyd)
- Cinderella – Romesh (Romesh Ranganathan)
- Criminal Activities – Noah (Dan Stevens)
- Criminal Minds – Spencer Reid (Matthew Gray Gubler)
- Deadpool & Wolverine – Remy LaBeau / Gambit (Channing Tatum)
- Final Destination 3 – Ian McKinley (Kris Lemche)
- The Gilded Age – Oscar van Rhijn (Blake Ritson)
- His Dark Materials – Pantalaimon (Kit Connor)
- Houdini & Doyle – Harry Houdini (Michael Weston)
- A Lot like Love – Oliver Martin (Ashton Kutcher)
- Martial Arts of Shaolin – Lin Zhi-ming (Jet Li)
- A Minecraft Movie – Daryl (Jemaine Clement)
- My First Wedding – Nick (Kenny Doughty)
- Nerve – Ian/Sam (Dave Franco)
- Peaceful – Benjamin (Benoît Magimel)
- Peter Rabbit 2: The Runaway – Tom Kitten
- The Roundup: No Way Out – Jang Tae-soo (Lee Beom-soo)
- Shane (New Era Movies edition) – Joe Starrett (Van Heflin)
- Strays – Bug (Jamie Foxx)
- The Time Traveler's Wife – Gomez (Desmin Borges)
- Wonka – Officer Attable (Kobna Holdbrook-Smith)

==== Animation ====
- Generator Rex – Rex
- The Nut Job 2: Nutty by Nature – Surly
- Playmobil: The Movie – Rex Dasher
- The Stolen Princess – Farlaf

== Solo discography ==
=== Albums ===
zui (髄; lit. "marrow) is the first solo album by Showtaro Morikubo, released in 2001. "The Answer" and "Moon Light" were the album's promotional tracks, being used in the video game series Rockman X as the opening themes to Rockman X6. "The Answer" appeared as the album's only single, paired with the B-side "Happy Monday Man". The concert for this album – later released on DVD and included the promotional video for "The Answer" – is entitled "Showtaro Morikubo Live House Tour '01 ~Okubyō Mono no G Kōi~" (臆病者のG行為 lit. "G Conduct of a Coward").

1. Build Up!!! [鍛]
2. Power
3. G Kōi (G行為 lit. "G Conduct")
4. Karada Kensa (身体検査 lit. "Physical Examination")
5. Rainy Day
6. The Answer
7. Hedgehog Peter
8. Okubyō Mono (臆病者 lit. "Coward")
9. Moon Light
10. End of the Sky

kyo (叫〜kyo〜 lit. "exclaim")

1. 叫〜kyo〜
2. Key
3. dizzy candy
4. DoPaMiNe
5. My Destination
6. Crazy night
7. Never surrender
8. Home sweet home
9. Parallel World
10. Catharsis-Dinner
11. Whenever I go
12. UNDER CONSTRUCTION
13. Ride Free
14. never ends...

rin (凛〜rin〜 lit. "frigid)

1. Introduction Rin
2. Let's get started
3. Cloudy sky
4. D.I.G.
5. MIRROR
6. 〜interlude〜 「Detox」
7. Fatboy
8. nothing to lose
9. gravIty
10. Stand down
11. Water in the tub
12. Mr.CLOWN

=== Solo singles ===
- The Answer
- being the TRY
- Lazy Mind
- Ride Free
- Parallel World
- Stand down
- Mr.CLOWN
- CHAIN REACTION
- TRIBALISM ～sunrise side～
- TRIBALISM ～sunset side～
- Focus
- PHANTOM PAIN
- TRUTH

== Other discography ==
=== Albums ===
Hard Spirit is an album released from one of Morikubo's most popular voice actor units, Heart-beat, in which he paired up with fellow voice actor Hiroki Takahashi. The album spawned two singles, "Shootin' Stars" and "Continued". This album was also featured in a three part live action series, "Cross Chord", a drama starring both voice actors as the lead characters. In addition to the main album, both Morikubo and Takahashi released separate albums (titled Show and Hero for each artist, respectively) containing solo versions of the Hard Spirit songs, along with two exclusively solo tracks, each (both of which are also included on "Hard Spirit"). Morikubo sings alone in "Hurry Up Drive" and "Change or Never change", and Takahashi's solos are "Thanks for..." and "Believe me".

1. Cross Chord
2. Shootin' Stars (Movie Version)
3. Continued (Movie Version)
4. Hurry Up Drive
5. Change or Never Change
6. Thanks for...
7. Believe Me
8. Shootin' Stars (Single Version)
9. Continued (Single Version)

=== Singles ===
- CONTINUED
- Shootin' stars

=== Notable songs ===
- "Moon Light", used in Rockman X6 as the main opening theme.
- "The Answer", used as a second opening theme for the aforementioned game.
- "Lazy Mind", used as the ending theme for Rockman X7. It is still heard in the English release of the game, but is instrumental only.
- "Begin the Try" (begin the TRY), used as the second ending theme to the anime Rockman.EXE.

== DVD ==
- Showtaro Morikubo Okubyō Mono no G Kōi Live House Tour '01
- Cross Chord (Volumes 1–3)

== Awards ==
Year	Award	Category	Result
2016	10th Seiyu Awards	Kei Tomiyama Memorial Award	Won
