= Seven Days (manga) =

Japanese manga series

- Cover of the Japanese version of Seven Days: Monday-Thursday, featuring Seryō and Shino.

セブンデイズ (Sebun Deizu)
- Genre: Boys' love
- Manga

Seven Days: Monday-Thursday
- Written by: Venio Tachibana
- Illustrated by: Rihito Takarai
- Published by: Taiyoh Tosho
- English publisher: NA: SuBLime
- Imprint: Million Comics Craft Series
- Magazine: Craft
- Published: 2007
- Volumes: 1
- Manga

Seven Days: Friday-Sunday
- Written by: Venio Tachibana
- Illustrated by: Rihito Takarai
- Published by: Taiyoh Tosho
- English publisher: NA: SuBLime
- Imprint: Million Comics Craft Series
- Magazine: Craft
- Original run: 2008 – 2009
- Volumes: 1
- Live-action film

Seven Days: Monday-Thursday
- Directed by: Takeshi Yokoi
- Written by: Natsuko Takahashi
- Studio: Argo Pictures
- Released: June 6, 2015
- Live-action film

Seven Days: Friday-Sunday
- Directed by: Takeshi Yokoi
- Written by: Natsuko Takahashi
- Studio: Argo Pictures
- Released: July 4, 2015

Seven Days (Japanese: セブンデイズ, Hepburn: Sebun Deizu) is a Japanese manga written by Venio Tachibana and illustrated by Rihito Takarai. Seven Days was serialized in the quarterly boys' love manga magazine Craft from 2007 to 2009. The story was released in two parts: Seven Days: Monday-Thursday and Seven Days: Friday-Sunday. A live-action film duology adaptation for both books was released in 2015.

== Plot ==
Yuzuru Shino, a bored and disillusioned third-year high school student, hears a rumor that Tōji Seryō, a popular student at school, will accept anyone who asks him out at the beginning of the week and end their relationship after seven days of dating. Yuzuru decides to ask Tōji out as a half-hearted joke, but, to his surprise, Tōji accepts their date. Over the course of seven days, Yuzuru's feelings for him grow, and he begins to dread the impending day where they will inevitably end their relationship.

== Characters ==
Yuzuru Shino (篠弓弦, Shino Yuzuru)
Voiced by: Jun Fukuyama (drama CD); portrayed by: Takeshi James Yamada (film)
Tōji Seryō (芹生冬至, Seryō Tōji)
Voiced by: Yuichi Nakamura (drama CD); portrayed by: Tomoki Hirose (film)

== Media ==
=== Manga ===
Seven Days is written by Venio Tachibana and illustrated by Rihito Takarai. It was serialized in the quarterly boys' love manga magazine anthology Craft from 2007 to 2009. The chapters were later released in bound volumes by Taiyoh Tosho under the Million Comics Craft Series imprint. The first volume was released under the title Seven Days: Monday-Thursday in 2007, while the second volume was released as Seven Days: Friday-Sunday in 2009. Drama CD adaptations of both books were released.

In October 2009, Digital Manga Publishing announced at Yaoi-Con that they were distributing the books in English under the Juné imprint. In March 2019, Viz Media took over English distribution rights and published both books as an omnibus titled Seven Days: Monday-Sunday under the SuBLime imprint.

| No. | Title | Original release date | English release date |
|---|---|---|---|
| 1 | Seven Days: Monday-Thursday; Sebun Deizu: Monday→Thursday (セブンデイズ MONDAY→THURSDAY) | September 1, 2007; 978-4813050858 | October 12, 2010 (Juné); December 10, 2019 (SuBLime) (Note: SuBLime reprinted both volumes as an omnibus titled Seven Days: Monday-Sunday.); 978-1569700662 |
| 2 | Seven Days: Friday-Sunday; Sebun Deizu: Friday→Sunday (セブンデイズ FRIDAY→SUNDAY) | June 1, 2009; 978-4-81-305193-0 | November 15, 2011 (Juné); December 10, 2019 (SuBLime); 978-1-56-970229-1 (Juné); ISBN 978-1-97-470927-4 (SuBLime) |

=== Film ===
Two live-action film adaptations were announced in 2015, each adapting both books in the series. Both films are directed by Takeshi Yokoi, with screenplay by Natsuko Takahashi. The films star Tomoki Hirose and Takeshi James Yamada, with Hinako Tanaka, Yūki Hiyori, Rin Ishikawa, Itsuki Sagara, and Yukihiro Takiguchi in supporting roles. The first film, Seven Days: Monday-Thursday, premiered on June 6, 2015, in Humax Cinemas in Tokyo, followed by other theaters in Japan. The second film, Seven Days: Friday-Sunday, premiered on July 4, 2015. Prior to the film's release, a behind-the-scenes DVD of Seven Days: Monday-Thursday was released on May 20, 2015, where it debuted at #73 on the Oricon DVD Weekly Charts. Pony Canyon released both movies as a set on DVD and Blu-ray on December 16, 2015. The DVD peaked at #48 on the Oricon DVD Weekly Charts, while the Blu-ray peaked at #59 on the Oricon Blu-ray Weekly Charts.

== Reception ==
Seven Days was ranked #5 as one of the best boys love stories in Kono BL ga Yabai! 2010 Fujoshi Edition. In 2018, it was selected by visitors of the website Nijimen as one of the best boys' love manga for newcomers to the genre.

Seven Days was part of the inspiration behind the 2019 novel Date Me, Bryson Keller by South African author Kevin van Whye, who wrote the novel out of his critiques on Seven Days and the yaoi genre in general with respect to "actual and realistic LGBT culture."
