= Arcam =

Swedish manufacturer of 3D printers

Arcam Aktiebolag
- Trade name: Arcam AB
- Company type: Subsidiary
- Industry: Manufacturing
- Founded: 1997
- Founder: Ralf Larson & Jarl Assmundson
- Headquarters: Mölndal, Sweden
- Owner: GE Sweden Holdings AB (2016)

Arcam AB manufactures electron beam melting (EBM) systems for use in additive manufacturing, which create solid parts from metal powders. Arcam also produces metal powder through AP&C and medical implants through DiSanto Technologies.

Arcam AB was founded by innovator Ralf Larson and financier Jarl Assmundson, in 1997.

Arcam AB was a publicly traded company listed on the Stockholm Stock Exchange under ARCM but was also commonly quoted as OTC stock under AMAVF. Arcam AB corporate headquarters are in Mölndal, Sweden. EBM has applications in the medical, aerospace and automotive industries.

In September 2016, General Electric announced its plans for acquisition of Arcam AB.

Arcam was delisted from the Stockholm Stock Exchange in January 2018.
