= Zibn teg =

Weekly Yiddish newspaper (1935–1936)

- Type: Weekly newspaper
- Political alignment: Communist
- Language: Yiddish
- Headquarters: Vilnius
- Country: Second Polish Republic

Zibn teg (Yiddish: זיבן טעג, 'Seven Days') was a weekly Yiddish literary newspaper, published in Wilno (then in Second Polish Republic, now Vilnius, Lithuania) in 1935 and the spring of 1936. The newspaper was similar to the banned publication Fraynd, and was printed at the same printing house (Boris Kleckin) in Wilno. The Polish authorities labelled Zibn teg 'crypto-communist'.
