= List of Spriggan characters =

The following is a list of notable and recurring characters featured in the manga series Spriggan written by Hiroshi Takashige and illustrated by Ryōji Minagawa. The story is set during the end of the Cold War, when mysterious OOPArts (out-of-place artifacts) are discovered around the world, leading to a secret war against the ARCAM Corporation, an organization that has placed itself as the guardian of the OOPArts to prevent them from being used as weapons.

== Protagonists ==
=== Yu Ominae ===
Yu Ominae (御神苗優, Ominae Yū) is the series protagonist. Although he is known to his teachers and classmates as a high school delinquent, Yu is secretly a special Spriggan agent for ARCAM. As such, he is often disrupted from his studies as he is called upon by ARCAM to conduct black ops for the company and gets sent on missions in and out of Japan. Yu Ominae is voiced by Showtaro Morikubo in Japanese and Chris Patton in English. In the 2022 ONA adaptation, he is voiced by Chiaki Kobayashi in Japanese and Kyle McCarley in English.

=== Jean Jacquemonde ===
Jean Jacquemonde (ジャン・ジャックモンド, Jan Jakkumondo) is a French Spriggan operator who is able to shapeshift into a werewolf using ancient biotechnology. He actively assists Yu in battling enemies of ARCAM. Jean Jacquemonde is voiced by Takehito Koyasu in Japanese and Andy McAvin in English. In the 2022 ONA adaptation, he is voiced by Yōhei Azakami in Japanese and Xander Mobus in English.

=== Tea Flatte ===
Tea Flatte Arcam, better known as Tea Flatte (ティア・フラット, Tia Furatto), is a British Spriggan operator stationed in ARCAM's British headquarters. She was granted immortality by the wizard Merlin and possesses a special ability allowing her to summon illusions to fool her enemies.

=== Oboro ===
Oboro (朧) is a skilled Qigong martial artist and is capable of dim mak, the ability to paralyze his opponents with a single touch. In the 2022 ONA adaptation, he is voiced by Takehito Koyasu in Japanese and Bill Rogers in English.

== Antagonists ==
=== Iwao Akatsuki ===
Iwao Akatsuki (暁巌, Akatsuki Iwao) appears in Romania to eliminate Yu and other Spriggans, though Iwao's sense of honor eventually leads him to rescue Yu. He is later placed in charge of secretly transporting the Ark of the Covenant. Near the end of the series, Iwao is targeted for termination by COSMOS forces. In the 2022 ONA adaptation, he is voiced by Yoshimasa Hosoya in Japanese and Kaiji Tang in English.

=== Bo Brantz ===
A secret agent for a Neo-Nazi faction based in Egypt, Bo Brantz (ボー・ブランツェ, Boo Burantse) serves as Kutheimer's chief bodyguard. Near the end of the series, Bo teams up with Iwao to fight COSMOS after the two are targeted for termination by Trident. Although they are able to stop COSMOS, Bo is critically wounded and dies from his injuries. In the 2022 ONA adaptation, Bo is voiced by Tetsu Inada in Japanese and Kyle Hebert in English.

=== Larry Markson ===
Larry Markson (ラリー・マーカスン, Rarii Makusun) is an influential figure in the Trident Corporation, allowing him to gain access to assets in various national militaries and claim out-of-place artifacts for military purposes. In the 2022 ONA series, Markson is voiced by Ryōta Takeuchi in Japanese and Armen Tayor in English.

=== Henry Garnum ===
Henry Garnum (ヘウンリー・ガーナム, Heunri Gaanamu) is the president of the ARCAM Corporation. After taking control of ARCAM's field operations, he uses ARCAM agents to the South Pole to assist Trident in excavating and studying artifacts and the potential military use of the South Pole Shrine.

=== Sho Kanaya ===
Sho Kanaya (金谷唱, Kanaya Shō) is secretly deployed to Yu's school to locate him and tricks many of the school's students and faculty into believing that he is a regular student. However, when Yu uncovers Sho's real identity, Sho wounds Yu with a knife before escaping. Later on, he leads a failed mission with several COSMOS platoons to raid ARCAM's Japan headquarters and lure the Spriggans from hiding. While in the hands of the Trident Corporation, Sho is augmented to increase his psychic powers in communicating with his fellow COSMOS soldiers.

== Other characters ==
=== Yamamoto ===
Head of the ARCAM Corporation's Japanese branch, Yamamoto (山本) took in Yu Ominae in as a ward after he found out that Yu was a former COSMOS child soldier. Yamamoto trained Yu in military and guerrilla tactics to help him be activated as a Spriggan agent. In the anime film, he is voiced by Kinryu Arimoto in Japanese and John Paul Shephard in English. In the 2022 ONA adaptation, he is voiced by Kenji Hamada in Japanese and Greg Chun in English.

=== Rie Yamabishi ===
Rie Yamabishi (山菱理恵, Yamabishi Rie) is a childhood friend of Yu who returned to Japan after receiving a report that Yu had been "spotted" somewhere in the country. She decodes some of the mappa mundi to locate other out-of-place artifacts. In the 2022 ONA adaptation, she is voiced by Mitsuho Kambe in Japanese and Xanthe Huynh in English.

=== Yoshino Somei ===
Yoshino Somei (染井芳乃, Somei Yoshino) is critically injured from a gunshot wound during an operation to acquire the Holy Grail. However, she is saved by the Adolf Hitler clone's good personality. In the 2022 ONA adaptation, she is voiced by Mariya Ise in Japanese and Jenny Yokobori in English.

=== Mayzel ===
Mayzel (メイゼル, Meizeru) first appeared in Turkey, having been sent to the Mount Ararat research facility by ARCAM to decipher whether or not Noah's Ark could be opened. Mayzel is not seen later in Spriggan until the last few chapters, where he was deployed to the South Pole alongside Margaret and several others. Mayzel is voiced by Kenji Shiroyama in Japanese and Ted Pfister in English.

== Minor characters ==
=== ARCAM ===
==== Steve H. Foster ====
Called Captain or Senchou (船長/せんちょう) by Yu, Steve H. Foster (スティーブ・H・フォスター, Suteibu H Fosutaa) is the captain of ARCAM's S. S. Rosinante, a hydrofoil boat. He assists Yu in his Spriggan operations against the Trident Corporation by allowing him to use his ship as transport. As one of Tea's former lovers, he is one of the few ARCAM personnel to know about Tea's secret heritage. In the 2022 ONA series, he is voiced by Akio Ōtsuka in Japanese and William Salyers in English.

==== Akiha Ominae ====
Ominae Akiha (秋葉 御神苗) is Yu's cousin, sister and guardian. She took him into her care with her father, Takashi Ominae, when she learned what happened to Yu's parents in Iran.

==== Miss Margaret ====
Margaret (マーガレット, Margaretto) is Professor Mayzel's assistant. The two have been working together since they were recruited by ARCAM to work on their Omihalcon-enhanced devices. In the anime, she is voiced by Sakiko Tamagawa in Japanese and Kelly Manison in English.

==== Jimmy Max ====
Jimmy Max (ジミー・マックス, Jimii Makusu) is an American operative with ARCAM's Special Private Army. He teams up with Yu to retake ARCAM's R&D center in the United States, and, though heavily wounded, he survives the operation.

==== Precup Ramdi ====
Precup Ramdi (パーカップ・ラムディ, Pākappu Ramudi) is a Spriggan working as a doctor in Thailand. Also known as "The Hand of God", Ramdi a renowned assassin when he was younger.

==== Professor Eva McMahon ====
Professor Eva McMahon (エヴァ・マクマホン博士, Eva Makumahon Hakasei) is Yu's history lecturer and a member of the ARCAM Foundation Archaeology Research Department. In the last chapter, she joins ARCAM researchers in fighting and protecting the earth from Fire Snake's attack.

==== Bowman ====
Bowman (ボーマン, Booman) is a former knife instructor in the Spriggans who taught Yu the basics of knife combat before moving to Trident. He is sent to Phantom Island to kill Yu and recover a Message Plate, though later dies of injuries sustained during knife combat. In the 2022 ONA adaptation, he is voiced by Takayuki Sugō in Japanese and Kaiji Tang in English.

=== British Military ===
==== Maria Clemente ====
Maria Clemente (マリア・クレメンティ, Maria Kurementei) is one of the British army's youngest officers, having enlisted in the army as a Lieutenant-Colonel at the age of 20. She assists Yu in defeating Mauser and eliminating the Berserker, sustaining a shot in her stomach. In the 2022 ONA adaptation, she is voiced by Saori Hayami in Japanese and Gilli Messer in English.

==== Professor Mauser ====
Mauser (マウザー, Mauzaa) is a research scientist who enlists the help of the British army in securing the remains of the Berserker from an excavation site in rural Britain. He dies when Maria turns his pistol against him during a fight in the main control room, killing the enraged scientist. In the 2022 ONA adaptation, He is voiced by Ikkyu Juku in Japanese and William Salyers in English.

=== Electy ===
==== Ed Kruger ====
Ed Kruger (エド・クルーガー, Edo Kuruugaa) is a former ARCAM research scientist. He was lured over to Ryang's Electy organization with promise of money and fame. When Electy's base in the mountains of Thailand is destroyed, Ed chooses to commit suicide instead of facing capture.

==== Lyan ====
Lyan (リャン, Ryan) is a Thai national who created Electy, an organization that manages to cultivate a drug that could temporarily grant a person immortality. His operation is destroyed by Yu, Yoshino, Oboro and Percup. He is defeated when Percup quickly takes his heart out, instantly killing him.

=== Machiner's Platoon ===
==== Colonel McDougal ====
McDougal (マクドガル, Makudogaru) is a child who was partially cyberized by MJ-12. He is granted psychokinetic powers by a psychic amplifier implanted in his brain. He is feared in the organization for his deadly abilities.

In the film, McDougal is the main antagonist. Though he is quite sinister, he masks his true personality with his young appearance. His ultimate goal was to gain control over the Ark and use it to recreate the world as he saw fit by killing off all of humanity with the Ark's weather-controlling capabilities. He was defeated by Yu and committed suicide by activating Noah's Ark self-destruct mode. In the anime film, he is voiced by Ryuji Aigase in Japanese and Kevin Corn in English. In the 2022 ONA adaptation, he is voiced by Ayumu Murase in Japenese and Tiana Camacho in English.

==== Fatman ====
Fatman (ファットマン, Fattoman) is a Machiner's Platoon operative. He killed by Jean using Jean's Franchi SPAS-12 shotgun. In the anime film, Major Fatman was Yu's former COSMOS commander, and is eventually killed by Yu's uncontrolled quiet rage. In the film, Fatman is voiced by Kenji Takano in Japanese and Mike Kleihenz in English. In the 2022 ONA adaptation, he is voiced by Yasuhiro Mamiya in Japanese and William Salyers in English.

==== Little Boy ====
Little Boy (リトルボーイ, Riterubooi) is an operative for the Machiner Platoon and Fatman's sidekick during an attack on ARCAM. Little Boy is killed by Jean when he turns into a lycanthrope. In the anime film, he is killed when he becomes trapped in a truck that eventually explodes. In the film, Little Boy is voiced by Katsumi Suzuki in Japanese and Spike Spencer in English. In the 2022 ONA adaptation he is voiced by Mitsuo Iwata in Japanese and Aleks Le in English.

==== Humming Bat ====
Humming Bat (ハミング・バット, Hamingu Batto) is an American Machiner Platoon operative with the rank of Major. An expert combat knife user, his cybernetic hands emit smoke and deafening ultrasound waves. Eventually, he is defeated and his arms are cut off by Yu. In the 2022 ONA adaptation, he is voiced by Takuya Kirimoto in Japanese and Kyle Hebert in English.

=== Neo-Nazis ===
==== Kutheimer ====
Kutheimer (ケルトハイマー, Kerutohaimaa) is a former Colonel in Nazi Germany. He is paralyzed by Oboro and his face is scarred. He was killed by a shockwave from the Vajrayana.

==== Adolf Hitler ====
Unlike the real Adolf Hitler (アドルフ・ヒトラー, Adorufu Hitoraa), the Spriggan interpretation explains that he had two split personalities; one peaceful one and one was the one that the entire world knew him for. Upon placing his soul on a Hitler clone, it lost its memory and had the peaceful personality in place. However, it reverted to the evil personality when Kutheimer invoked the Sieg Heil chant on it. The Hitler clone had the ability to regenerate its wounds and heal other people's injuries. It died when the Vajrayana exploded.

==== Hans Schneider ====
Hans Schneider (ハンス・シュナイダー, Hansu Shunaidaa) is an assassin recruited by Kutheimer to eliminate Shozo Kawahara and his expedition in Egypt to acquire the Crystal Skull. Eventually, while fighting Yu, Yu kicked him out a building, causing him to fall to his death.

=== Trident Corporation ===
==== Hedgehog ====
Hedgehog (ヘッジホック, Hejjihokku) is a Trident officer with glasses and blonde hair. He is known to have a prosthetic right arm that conceals a needle gun that can fire powerful shots able critically injure a human or destroy an object.

==== Jack the Ripper ====
Jack the Ripper (ジャック・ザ・リッパー, Jakku Za Rippaa) is one of the most dangerous Trident field operatives. His cybernetic arms conceal Omihalcon High Frequency blades. He was seriously wounded by Yu during an operation in Mali, but was able to escape. He is the fourth recipient of the Armored Machine Suit.

==== Sidewinder ====
Sidewinder (サイドワインダー, Saidowaindaa) is a cyborg from the Trident Corporation. His robotic hands conceal sharp steel dart heads that can be fired from his fingertips. He is the fifth bearer of the Armored Machine Suit.

==== Dary Graham ====
The only non-human and vampire operative of Trident, Dary Graham (デリー・グレアム, Derii Gureamu) sucks the life out of his victims, deteriorating them to a state of deadly malnourishment him. He fights with a combat knife and his vampiric skills include teleportation and the regeneration of wounds. He is the only Trident Corporation super soldier operative not to wear the Armored Machine Suit. His vampiric appearance, skills and his regeneration abilities are mainly due to biotechnology, while his healing powers were improved by Trident. He generally looks down on normal people because of his biological lineage. He was last seen trapped in another alternate dimension, being placed there by Tea Flatte.

==== Thunderbolt ====
Thunderbolt (サンダー・ボルト, Sandaa Boruto) is a Trident operative whose cybernetic arms emit electrical charges similar to thunder bolts. Like Humming Bat, he is defeated when his right hand is lopped off by Yu's Omihalcon knife before being knocked out with a punch to his face.

=== Civilians ===
==== Kate ====
Sister Kate (シスター・ケイト, Shisutaa Keito) is a nun who assists Yu and Oboro in defeating a small cult. She is wounded in a gunfight between Israeli and Western special forces and Iraqi soldiers.

==== Tanaka ====
Tanaka (田中) is an exclusive character in the animated movie. He is one of Yu's vanished classmates who were kidnapped by the American Machine Corp. When Tanaka mysteriously shows up back in school, he has explosives strapped on his body and a hidden detonator in his hand. Yu tries to save him, but Tanaka had been forced, possibly by remote hypnotism, to be a suicide bomber.

=== Felton Family ===
==== Maria Felton ====
Maria Felton (マリア・フェルトン, Maria Feruton) is Jean's foster mother. Her death leads to Jean's personal war against the Trident Corporation.

==== Mark Felton ====
Mark Felton (マーク・フェルトン, Maaku Feruton) is Maria's biological son and Jean's foster brother. He and his mother were killed by Trident.

=== Kawahara Family ===
==== Shozo Kawahara ====
Kawahara Shozo (正三 川原) is a Japanese archaeologist who receives ARCAM funding to conduct an excavation in Egypt. His death at the hands of local Neo-Nazi radicals from blood loss angers his daughter, Suzuko.

==== Suzuko Kawahara ====
Kawahara Suzuko (鈴子 川原) is the only daughter of Shozo Kawahara. She is targeted by Neo-Nazi assassins when she goes to Egypt to grieve her father.

==== Yayoi Okabe ====
Okabe Yayoi (弥生 岡部) is Yu's high school classmate.

==== Takashi Ominae ====
Ominae Takashi (御神苗隆) is Akiha Ominae's biological father and Yu's uncle. He knows about Yu's semi-augmented condition and helps him fight Trident.

==== Sasahara Family ====
===== Koichi Sasahara =====
Sasahara Koichi (耕一 笹原) is a professor researching the Mask of Palenque. When he is possessed by Tezcatlipoca, he hires a mercenary to kill Yu as he saw them as obstacles for him to using the Mask to take over the world.

===== Hatsuho Sasahara =====
Sasahara Hatsuho (初穂 笹原) is Yu's classmate and Kagaho's sister. She helps Yu free Kagaho from the influence of the Mask and save their father from Tezcatlipoca.

===== Kagaho Sasahara =====
Sasahara Kagaho (香穂 笹原) is Hatsuho's younger sister and Yu's friend. She is possessed by the Mask of Palenque before being freed by Yu and Hatsuho. In her possessed state, Kagaho can hover and teleport. She is able to hurl energy balls and is invulnerable to firearm bullets.

=== Others ===
==== Dutch "Iron Arm" Metrisk ====
Dutch Metrisk (ダッチメトリソク, Datchi Metorisoku) is a former Machiner's Platoon. He is now a mercenary hired by the possessed Professor Sasahara to eliminate Yu and the Sasahara sisters. He has a cyberized right arm which can fire fire-based projectiles and has a concealable knife blade. He is later killed by Yu with a combat knife.

==== Heunri Balez ====
Heunri Balez and Knights. (From left to right: Aqua, Desert, Heunri Balez's False Body, and Shadow)

Heunri Balez (ヘウンリ・バレズ, Heunri Barezu) is an underground sorcerer who fights with black magic. He is accompanied by his guardians Aqua, Desert and Shadow.

===== Aqua =====
Aqua is an armored creature who fights using water waves when he swings his sword. It is killed by Yu in the Iraqi desert.

===== Desert =====
Desert is an armored creature defeated by Yu who fights using deadly hard sand blasts.

===== Shadow =====
Shadow has a helmet resembling a skull. It uses the Darkness spell to send his enemies to the dark dimension. It is killed by Oboro.

==== Tony Bennett ====
Tony Bennett (トニー・ベネット, Toni Benetto) is a mercenary and assassin who worked for the CIA and Trident before moving to ARCAM. He was assumed to be killed by Machiner's Platoon agent Jack the Ripper in Mali, but was actually alive until the end of the series, where Jean kills him by flinging him into a raging fire, killing him.

==== Yuan Shuanglie ====
Yuan Shuanglie (simplified Chinese: 源双烈; traditional Chinese: 源雙烈; pinyin: Yuán Shuāngliè) or Chen Swanlie (チェン・スワンリェ, Chen Suwanrye) was Oboro's former arch-rival during training.

==== Koichi Moroha ====
Moroha Koichi (諸刃功一) is a Japanese KGB agent. He is the bearer of the Hihiirokane sword and is a moderate psychic who uses the Tornado Beast to create winds that can dismember limbs. He is killed when Yu punches him into the erupted lava of Mount Fuji, burning him to death. In the 2022 ONA adaptation, he is voiced by Ken Narita.

==== Kenzou Nakano ====
Nakano Kenzou (中野建造) is a villain ninja and main antagonist in the Study Tour episode. He is killed by Yu.

==== Rick Bordeau ====
Rick Bordeau (リーク・ボロデアウ, Riiku Borodeau) is a French lycanthrope who fought against Jean Jacquemonde in Romania.

==== Ralph Cooley ====
Ralph Cooley (ラルフ・クーリー, Rarufu Kuurii) is an officer in the US Army who leads the COSMOS Project that trains children for government-sanctioned black ops missions to conduct operations that could not expose the US government. Yu eventually slits Cooley's throat with his Omihalcon-made combat knife, instantly killing him.

==== Viktor Stolov ====
Viktor Stolov (ヴィクトル・シュトローフ, Viikutoru Shutoroofu) is a Soviet soldier from the Spetsnaz. He infiltrates Japanese territory to help locate the Temple of Fire and the Fire Orb for the Soviet Union. Viktor dies from an eruption of Mt. Fuji caused by the Fire Orb's powers.

=== Organizations ===
==== ARCAM ====
The ARCAM Corporation is an American company that has branches across the globe. Its mission is to covertly secure and destroy all ancient artifacts from all enemies that may use them for their own benefit. Its breakthrough was the refinement of Orichalcum, a strong metal used for ARCAM's Armored Muscle Suit and Yu's combat knife.

==== ARCAM Private Army ====
The ARCAM Private Army is ARCAM's paramilitary whose main purpose is to conduct operations on various artifact locations and its aggressors, ranging from private corporate military wings to national militaries.

==== Spriggans ====
Spriggans are one of the ARCAM Private Army's divisions, consisting of special agents recruited for covert work in hostile areas without compromising the company.

==== Trident Corporation ====
Though the Trident Corporation was originally founded by NATO as an R&D Division, it went rogue for unknown reasons and is declared an illegal organization. It searches for ancient artifacts to refine as potential military weapons.

==== COSMOS ====
COSMOS (Children Of Soldiers Machine Organic System) is a black-ops unit of the US Army. Most of its operatives are child soldiers kidnapped and brainwashed by CIA agents and US Army soldiers from around the world.
