= Seven-Day War =

The Seven-Day War can refer to the:

- Polish–Czechoslovak War, fought between Poland and Czechoslovakia, from January 23 to January 30, 1919, known in Czech sources as the Seven-Day War
- Operation Accountability, fought between Israel and Hezbollah from July 25 to July 31, 1993
- Seven day war, fought between the African National Congress and the Inkatha Freedom Party from 25 March to 31 March 1990
