= Amsterdam Centre for Architecture =

Amsterdam Centre for Architecture (Arcam)
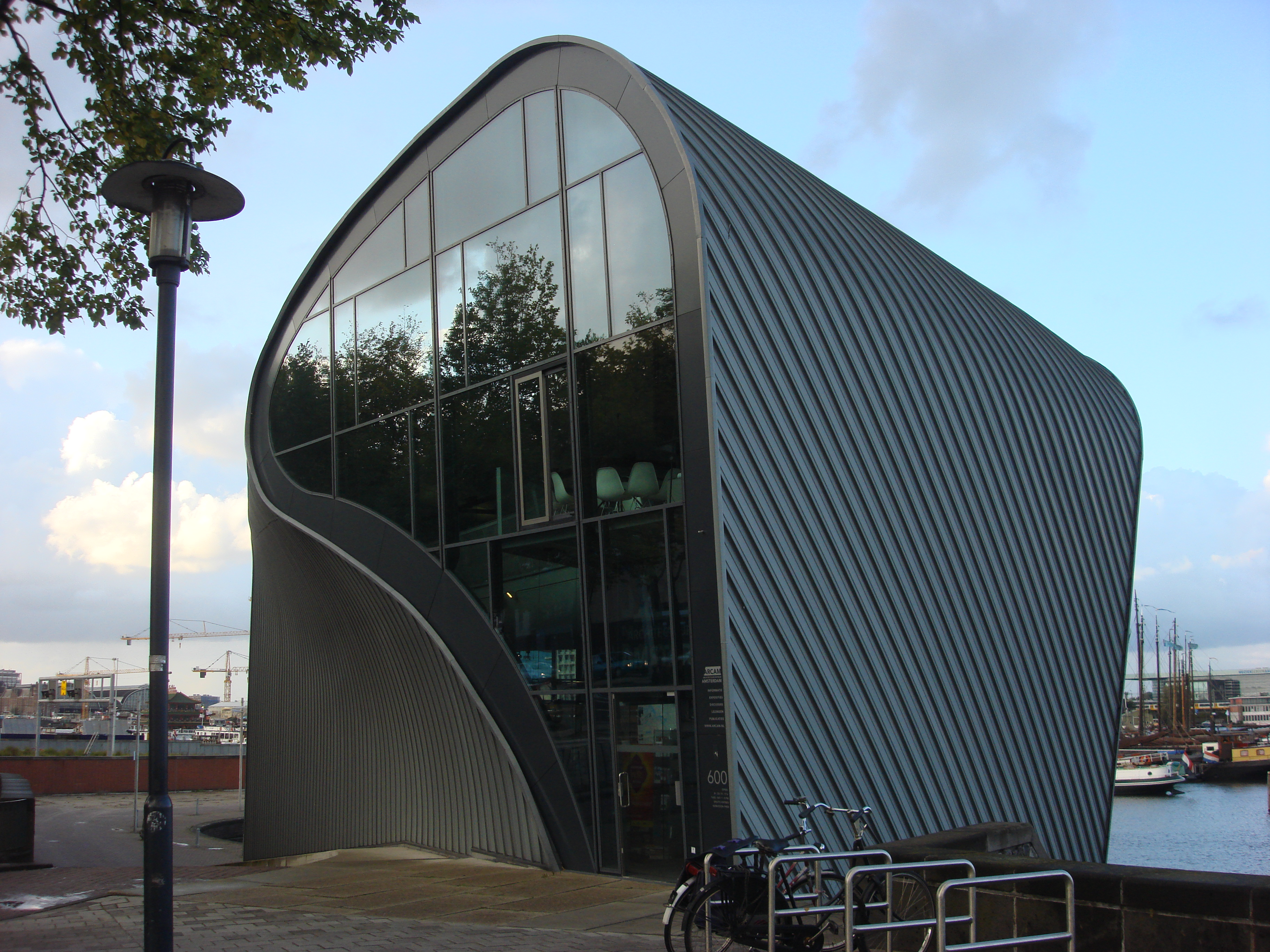
- Arcam building on Prins Hendrikkade / Oosterdok

- Location within the city center of Amsterdam
- Established: 1986
- Location: Prins Hendrikkade 600; Amsterdam, Netherlands
- Coordinates: 52.372216°N 4.912676°E
- Type: Architecture museum
- Visitors: 16.795 (2014)
- Director: Indira van 't Klooster
- Website: www.arcam.nl/en/

Amsterdam Centre for Architecture (Arcam) is an organisation that was founded in 1986 that "concentrates its activities in Amsterdam and the surrounding area." Arcam focuses on architecture, urban design, and landscape architecture. Arcam is the oldest and largest of more than forty local Dutch architecture centers.

== Architecture ==
The building was designed by René van Zuuk. The building is a trapezoidal form with three floors.

== Foundation ==
The director of Arcam is Indira van 't Klooster. Arcam's work is made possible by donors, sponsors, several services of the municipality of Amsterdam and the Stimuleringsfonds voor Architectuur (English: Support Foundation for Architecture).

== Activities ==
Arcam provides information about architecture throughout the city of Amsterdam. The institution disperses this information in various ways, including Architectuurgids (Architecture Guides), crash courses, and guided tours. Additionally, the museum offers temporary and permanent exhibitions.
