= Ten Count (manga) =

Manga series by Rihito Takarai

- Volume 1 cover, featuring Shirotani

テンカウント (Ten Kaunto)
- Genre: Boys' love
- Manga
- Written by: Rihito Takarai
- Published by: Shinshokan
- English publisher: NA: SuBLime
- Imprint: Dear+ Comics
- Magazine: Dear+
- Original run: July 13, 2013 – November 14, 2017
- Volumes: 6
- Video game

Ten Count: Another Days for Ameba
- Developer: Arithmetic
- Publisher: Ameba
- Genre: Puzzle
- Platform: Browser
- Released: JP: December 15, 2017
- Video game

Ten Count for App React
- Developer: Arithmetic
- Publisher: Arithmetic
- Genre: Puzzle
- Platform: iOS; Android
- Released: JP: January 7, 2019

Ten Count (Japanese: テンカウント, Hepburn: Ten Kaunto; also stylized as 10 Count) is a Japanese manga series written and illustrated by Rihito Takarai, serialized in the manga magazine Dear+ from 2013 to 2017. Two video game adaptations of the series have been produced.

== Plot ==
Tadaomi Shirotani has obsessive–compulsive disorder that manifests as severe mysophobia. He meets psychotherapist Riku Kurose, who recommends exposure and response prevention therapy and instructs Shirotani to write a list of ten actions he is unable to do:

1. Touch a doorknob barehanded
2. Allow someone else to touch one of my possessions
3. Buy a book from a bookstore
4. Hold the handles on a train
5. Eat a meal at a restaurant
6. Shake hands with someone barehanded
7. Hold someone else’s possession without disinfecting it first
8. Drink from the same glass as someone else
9. Allow someone else into my apartment
10. (initially left blank)

Kurose tells Shirotani he will be cured once he completes the items on the list. Shirotani makes steady progress on the list, until Kurose abruptly suspends their sessions; when pressed, he admits he has fallen in love with Shirotani, and felt it would be inappropriate to continue as his therapist. Shirotani nevertheless wishes to continue their sessions, and they resume therapy while simultaneously initiating a sexual relationship. Through a flashback, it transpires that the root cause of Shirotani's mysophobia is a childhood trauma of witnessing his father having sex: the self-loathing he experienced after becoming aroused by the sight of his father, combined with the shame of being caught masturbating to the incident, prompted him to associate physical contact and intimacy with feelings of disgust.

As Kurose and Shirotani's relationship intensifies, Kurose notes that Shirotani is simultaneously repulsed and sexually aroused by his advances. Kurose reveals that he is a sadist who derives pleasure from triggering Shirotani's mysophobia, and has intuited that Shirotani is a masochist who derives pleasure from the very acts that disgust him. Shirotani rejects Kurose, and they do not speak for many months. After a chance encounter, Kurose and Shirotani reconcile their relationship. Shirotani reveals the tenth item on his list – to be patted on the head, an act he associates with his father – and admits that he loves Kurose. Shirotani finds he is now comfortable enough to reciprocate Kurose sexually.

In an epilogue, Kurose quits his clinic job to study for a doctorate in psychology. Shirotani, having completed the list, has significantly alleviated the symptoms of his mysophobia. Kurose admits that he was lying when said that completing the list would cure Shirotani's mysophobia, and proposes a second list to make amends: a list of ten actions that Shirotani wishes for Kurose to do.

== Characters ==
Tadaomi Shirotani (城谷 忠臣, Shirotani Tadaomi)
Voiced by: Shinnosuke Tachibana
A 31 year-old corporate secretary who suffers from obsessive–compulsive disorder and mysophobia.
Riku Kurose (黒瀬 陸, Kurose Riku)
Voiced by: Tomoaki Maeno
A 27 year-old psychotherapist specializing in psychosomatic medicine.
Ken Mikami (三上 健, Mikami Ken)
Voiced by: Jun Fukushima
Shirotani's friend and co-worker.
Kuramoto (くらもと)
Voiced by: Isshin Chiba
Shirotani's boss, and the CEO of the company
Ueda (うえだ)
Voiced by: Mai Tōdō
A student of Shirotani's father.
Nishigaki (にしがき)
Voiced by: Tarusuke Shingaki
A mysophobic author who Kurose befriends as a child.
Shiki Natsuya (夏屋 志姫, Natsuya Shiki)
Voiced by: Yoshitsugu Matsuoka
Masaya Fuwa (不破 雅也, Fuwa Masaya)
Voiced by: Takuya Satō

== Media ==
=== Manga ===
Rihito Takarai launched the manga in Shinshokan's Dear+ magazine in July 2013. The series ended on November 14, 2017. Viz Media's SuBLime imprint announced their license to the series at Yaoi-Con on September 19, 2015.

| No. | Original release date | Original ISBN | English release date | English ISBN |
|---|---|---|---|---|
| 1 | March 30, 2014 | 978-4-403-66419-9 | August 9, 2016 | 9781421588025 |
| 2 | September 30, 2014 | 978-4-403-66440-3 | November 8, 2016 | 9781421588032 |
| 3 | February 28, 2015 | 978-4-403-66461-8 | February 14, 2017 | 9781421588049 |
| 4 | October 30, 2015 | 978-4-403-66491-5 | May 9, 2017 | 9781421589060 |
| 5 | August 30, 2016 | 978-4-403-66514-1 (SE); 978-4-403-69002-0 (LE) | August 8, 2017 | 9781421593739 |
| 6 | March 26, 2018 | 978-4-403-66621-6 | December 11, 2018 | 9781421593746 |

=== Game ===
A social network game titled Ten Count: Another Days for Ameba was announced on December 15, 2017, and it was launched for Ameba users on March 22, 2018. Shinnosuke Tachibana and Tomoaki Maeno reprised their roles from the drama CD. The game also introduced new original characters, Shiki Natsuya and Masaya Fuwa, who are voiced by Yoshitsugu Matsuoka and Takuya Sato. The game ended services on November 29, 2019.

On August 1, 2018, a puzzle game for iOS and Android titled Ten Count for App React was announced and scheduled for a fall release, with all four main characters returning. The game was later released on January 7, 2019, with approximately 15,000 people downloading the game during launch, and by the end of the month, the number of players doubled to 30,000 people. The game ended services on June 30, 2020.

=== Cancelled anime ===
An anime adaptation was announced via a wraparound band on the final volume of the manga on March 26, 2018. A teaser trailer was released on March 23, 2019, which listed a 2020 premiere date for the series. On December 28, 2020, the anime production announced through the official website that the anime had been postponed to an unspecified date and that they were reconsidering its format. On October 29, 2022, the adaptation was revealed to be a film produced by East Fish Studio and SynergySP. The film was to be written and directed by So Toyama, with character designs handled by Tomomi Shimazaki, and was set to premiere in 2023. On January 19, 2024, it was announced that due to production circumstances, the film was cancelled.

== Reception ==
Ten Count sold a consecutive total of 2 million physical copies as of March 2018. In 2015, Ten Count was ranked #1 on the National Bookstores' Top Recommended Boys' Love, surveyed 470 employees across 400 bookstores nationwide in Japan. It was again ranked #1 for 2016 in the same survey. It won 3rd place for Best Manga in the Sugoi Japan Awards 2017. In 2018, it was selected by visitors of the website Nijimen as one of the best boys' love manga for newcomers to the genre.
