= Rihito Takarai =

Japanese manga artist

- 宝井 理人
- Born: October 17; Japan
- Other name: Octo
- Occupations: Manga artist; illustrator
- Years active: 2004–present
- Known for: Seven Days; Ten Count; Try Knights

Rihito Takarai (宝井 理人, Takarai Rihito; born October 17) is a Japanese manga artist and illustrator. Takarai started her career illustrating covers for novels in 2004 and later debuted as a manga artist in 2007 with Seven Days. She also publishes shonen manga under the pseudonym Octo.

== Works ==
=== Series ===
| Year | Title | Magazine | Notes |
|---|---|---|---|
| 2007 | Seven Days; Sebun Deizu (セブンデイズ) | Craft | Artwork |
| 2010 | Only the Flower Knows; Hana nomi zo Shiru (花のみぞ知る) | Craft | |
| 2012 | Hana no Miyako de (花のみやこで) | Craft | |
| 2013 | Ten Count; Ten Kaunto (テンカウント) | Dear+ | |
| 2013 | Graineliers; Gurannerie (グランネリエ) | Monthly G-Fantasy | |

=== Artbooks ===
| No. | Title | Japanese release date | Japanese ISBN |
|---|---|---|---|
| 1 | Takarai Rihito Irasuto Shū: Mirror (宝井理人イラスト集「MIRROR」) | December 15, 2015 | 978-4403650734 |

=== Design credits ===
| Year | Title | Notes |
|---|---|---|
| 2004 | Busō no Reijin Pretty Guardian | Illustration |
| 2006 | Rokumeikan no Alice | Illustration |
| 2007 | Fushuku no Keifu: Rokumeikan no Alice | Illustration |
| 2008 | Torikago no Kyō mo Nemutai Jūnin-tachi | Illustration |
| 2009 | Oborozuki ni, Aitai | Illustration |
| 2009 | Ariakezuki ni, Onegai | Illustration |
| 2009 | Corn Soup ga Ochitekite | Illustration |
| 2010 | Otonaki Sekai | Illustration |
| 2010 | Mayonaka no Lemonade | Illustration |
| 2010 | Doko ni Demo Koi no Hanashi | Illustration |
| 2011 | Tengoku o Yume Miteru | Illustration |
| 2011 | Nise Ouji Pina | Illustration |
| 2012 | Naranai Denwa ga Koi o Tsutaeru | Illustration |
| 2013 | Kimi ga Suki Datta | Illustration |
| 2013 | Hana Kaoru Ame no Na o | Illustration |
| 2013 | Teenage Blue | Illustration |
| 2014 | Ayakashi Ameya no Kamikakushi | Illustration |
| 2014 | Tsukikage Kottō Kanteijō | Illustration |
| 2015 | Sakuranokuni: Kirschbleute | Illustration |
| 2015 | Nade Nade CD Series | Illustration |
| 2016 | Kamakura Oyatsu Tokoro no Shinigami | Illustration |
| 2017 | Fate/Grand Order | Illustration |
| 2019 | Try Knights | Character design |
