= List of rivers of Japan =

Rivers of Japan are characterized by their relatively short lengths and considerably steep gradients due to the narrow and mountainous topography of the country. An often-cited quote is 'this is not a river, but a waterfall' by the Dutch engineer (o-yatoi gaikokujin) Johannis de Rijke who had visited the Jōganji River, Toyama Prefecture. The Mogami, the Fuji and the Kuma are regarded as the three most rapid rivers of Japan.

Typical rivers of Japan rise from mountainous forests and cut out deep V-shaped valleys in their upper reaches, and form alluvial plains in their lower reaches which enable the Japanese to cultivate rice fields and to set up cities. Most rivers are dammed to supply both water and electricity.

The longest river of Japan is the Shinano, which flows from Nagano to Niigata. The Tone has the largest watershed and serves water to more than 30 million inhabitants of Tokyo metropolitan area.

== Hokkaidō ==
There are 326 rivers in Hokkaido, including 13 class A river systems (1級水系 or 一級河川, ikkyū suikei) designated by the central government. The class A rivers are administered by Hokkaidō Regional Development Bureau (北海道開発局, Hokkaidō kaihatsukyoku). There are six class B river systems.

The following table lists the rivers of Hokkaidō by length. Use the column headers to sort by name, class, or tributary status.

River name	Length	Class	Tributary of	Refs
Ishikari (石狩川, Ishikari-gawa)	268 km (167 mi)	A		
Teshio (天塩川, Teshio-gawa)	256 km (159 mi)	A		
Tokachi (十勝川, Tokachi-gawa)	156 km (97 mi)	A		
Kushiro (釧路川, Kushiro-gawa)	154 km (96 mi)	A		
Yūbari (夕張川, Yūbari-gawa)	136 km (85 mi)	A	Ishikari	
Mu (鵡川, Mu-kawa)	135 km (84 mi)	A		
Shiribetsu (尻別川, Shiribetsu-gawa)	126 km (78 mi)	A		
Tokoro (常呂川, Tokoro-gawa)	120 km (75 mi)	A		
Abashiri (網走川, Abashiri-gawa)	115 km (71 mi)	A		
Chitose (千歳川, Chitose-gawa)	108 km (67 mi)	A	Ishikari	
Saru (沙流川, Saru-gawa)	104 km (65 mi)	A		
Akan (阿寒川, Akan-gawa)	98 km (61 mi)	B		
Yūbetsu (湧別川, Yūbetsu-gawa)	87 km (54 mi)	A		
Shokotsu (渚滑川, Shokotsu-gawa)	84 km (52 mi)	A		
Niikappu (新冠川, Niikappu-gawa)	80 km (50 mi)	B		
Shiribeshi-Toshibetsu (後志利別川, Shiribeshi-Toshibetsu-gawa)	80 km (50 mi)	A		
Shibetsu (標津川, Shibetsu-gawa)	78 km (48 mi)	B		
Toyohira (豊平川, Toyohira-gawa)	72.5 km (45.0 mi)	A	Ishikari	
Shizunai (静内川, Shizunai-gawa)	69.9 km (43.4 mi)	B		
Rumoi (留萌川, Rumoi-gawa)	44 km (27 mi)	A		
Koetoi (声問川, Koetoi-gawa)	41.9 km (26.0 mi)	B		
Mitsuishi (三石川, Mitsuishi-gawa)	31.6 km (19.6 mi)	B		
Shikiu (敷生川, Shikiu-gawa)	22.8 km (14.2 mi)	A		
Makomanai (真駒内川, Makomanai-gawa)	21 km (13 mi)	A	Toyohira	
Anano (穴の川, Ana-no-kawa)	9.4 km (5.8 mi)	A	Toyohira	

== Honshu ==
Rivers are listed by length. Columns can also be sorted by name, class, and tributary status.

River name	Length	Class	Tributary of	Refs
Shinano (信濃川, Shinano-gawa)	367 km (228 mi)	A		
Tone (利根川, Tone-gawa)	322 km (200 mi)	A		
Kitakami (北上川, Kitakami-gawa)	249 km (155 mi)	A		
Abukuma (阿武隈川, Abukuma-gawa)	239 km (149 mi)	A		
Kiso (木曽川, Kiso-gawa)	229 km (142 mi)	A		
Mogami (最上川, Mogami-gawa)	229 km (142 mi)	A		
Tenryū (天竜川, Tenryū-gawa)	213 km (132 mi)	A		
Agano (阿賀野川, Agano-gawa)	210 km (130 mi)	A		
Gōnokawa (江の川 or 江川, -gawa); Enokawa River (可愛川, Eno-kawa)	194 km (121 mi)	A		
Kumano (熊野川, Kumano-gawa); Shingu River (新宮川, Shingu-gawa)	183 km (114 mi)	A		
Arakawa (荒川, Arakawa)	173 km (107 mi)	A		
Ōi (大井川, Ōi-gawa)	168 km (104 mi)	A		
Nagara (長良川, Nagara-gawa)	166 km (103 mi)	A		
Hii (斐伊川, Hii-gawa)	153 km (95 mi)	A		
Naka (那珂川, Naka-gawa)	150 km (93 mi)	A		
Yura (由良川, -gawa)	146 km (91 mi)	A		
Asahi (旭川, Asahi-gawa)	142 km (88 mi)	A		
Mabechi (馬淵川, Mabechi-gawa)	142 km (88 mi)	A		
Tama (多摩川, Tama-gawa)	138 km (86 mi)	A		
Kinokawa (紀ノ川 or 紀の川); Yoshino River (吉野川, Yoshino-kawa)	136 km (85 mi)	A		
Yoneshiro (米代川, Yoneshiro-gawa)	136 km (85 mi)	A		
Omono (雄物川, Omono-gawa)	133 km (83 mi)	A		
Yoshii (吉井川, Yoshii-gawa)	133 km (83 mi)	A		
Fuji (富士川, Fuji-kawa)	128 km (80 mi)	A		
Kuji (久慈川, Kuji-gawa)	124 km (77 mi)	A		
Ibi (揖斐川, Ibi-gawa)	121 km (75 mi)	A		
Jinzū (神通川, Jinzū-gawa)	120 km (75 mi)	A		
Yahagi (矢作川, Yahagi-gawa)	117 km (73 mi)	A		
Kuzuryū (九頭竜川, Kuzuryū-gawa)	116 km (72 mi)	A		
Shō (庄川, Shō-gawa)	115 km (71 mi)	A		
Takahashi (高梁川, Takahashi-gawa)	111 km (69 mi)	A		
Sagami (相模川, Sagami-gawa)	109 km (68 mi)	A		
Katsura (桂川, Katsura-gawa); Ōi River (大堰川, Ōi-gawa)	107 km (66 mi)	A	Yodo	
Ōta (太田川, Ōta-gawa)	103 km (64 mi)	A		
Iwaki (岩木川, Iwaki-gawa)	102 km (63 mi)	A		
Kizu (木津川, Kizu-gawa)	99 km (62 mi)	A	Yodo	
Kako (加古川, Kako-gawa)	96 km (60 mi)	A		
Shōnai (庄内川, Shōnai-gawa)	96 km (60 mi)	A		
Miya (宮川, Miya-gawa)	91 km (57 mi)	A		
Naruse (鳴瀬川, Naruse-gawa)	89 km (55 mi)	A		
Ashida (芦田川, Ashida-gawa)	86 km (53 mi)	A		
Kurobe (黒部川, Kurobe-gawa)	85 km (53 mi)	A		
Kushida (櫛田川, Kushida-gawa)	85 km (53 mi)	A		
Takatsu (高津川, Takatsu-gawa)	81 km (50 mi)	A		
Hino (日野川, Hino-gawa)	77 km (48 mi)	A		
Toyo (豊川, Toyo-gawa)	77 km (48 mi)	A		
Yodo (淀川, Yodo-gawa); Seta River (瀬田川, Seta-gawa); Uji River (宇治川, Uji-gawa)	75 km (47 mi)	A		
Ara (荒川, Ara-kawa)	73 km (45 mi)	A		
Tedori (手取川, Tedori-gawa)	72 km (45 mi)	A		
Aka (赤川, Aka-gawa)	70 km (43 mi)	A		
Ibo (揖保川, Ibo-gawa)	69.75 km (43.34 mi)	A		
Maruyama (円山川, Maruyama-gawa)	68 km (42 mi)	A		
Oyabe (小矢部川, Oyabe-gawa)	68 km (42 mi)	A		
Yamato (大和川, Yamato-gawa)	68 km (42 mi)	A		
Oirase (奥入瀬川, Oirase-gawa)	67 km (42 mi)	B		
Muko (武庫川, Muko-gawa)	66 km (41 mi)	A		
Yasu (野洲川, Yasu-gawa)	65.25 km (40.54 mi)	A	Yodo	
Seki (関川, -gawa)	64 km (40 mi)	A		
Takase (高瀬川, Takase-gawa)	63.7 km (39.6 mi)	A		
Koyoshi (子吉川, Koyoshi-gawa)	61 km (38 mi)	A		
Hime (姫川, Hime-gawa)	60 km (37 mi)	A		
Edo (江戸川, Edo-gawa)	59.5 km (37.0 mi)	A	Tone	
Oze (小瀬川, Oze-gawa); Kono River (木野川, Kono-gawa)	59 km (37 mi)	A		
Saba (佐波川, Saba-gawa)	57 km (35 mi)	A		
Jōganji (常願寺川, Jōganji-gawa)	56 km (35 mi)	A		
Kumozu (雲出川, Kumozu-gawa)	55 km (34 mi)	A		
Natori (名取川, Natori-gawa)	55 km (34 mi)	A		
Abe (安倍川, Abe-kawa)	53.3 km (33.1 mi)	A		
Sendai (千代川, Sendai-gawa)	52 km (32 mi)	A		
Kano (狩野川, Kano-gawa)	46 km (29 mi)	A		
Sakawa (酒匂川, Sakawa-gawa)	46 km (29 mi)	A		
Kakehashi (梯川, Kakehashi-gawa)	42 km (26 mi)	A		
Suzuka (鈴鹿川, Suzuka-gawa)	40 km (25 mi)	A		
Tenjin (天神川, Tenjin-gawa)	32 km (20 mi)	A		
Kamo (鴨川, Kamo-gawa)	31 km (19 mi)	A	Yodo	
Kita (北川, Kita-gawa)	30 km (19 mi)	A		
Kiku (菊川, Kiku-gawa)	28 km (17 mi)	A		
Kanda (神田川, Kanda-gawa)	24.6 km (15.3 mi)	A	Arakawa	
Kibishima (Kibishima-gawa)	24.1 km (15.0 mi)	A		
Sumida (隅田川, Sumida-gawa)	23.5 km (14.6 mi)	A	Arakawa	
Tsurumi (鶴見川, Tsurumi-gawa)	22 km (14 mi)	A		
Aikawa (相川, Aikawa -gawa)	4.8 km (3.0 mi)	B		
Dōtonbori (道頓堀)	2.7 km (1.7 mi)	A	Yodo	

== Shikoku ==
First class rivers under control of Shikoku Regional Bureau (四国地方整備局)

- Yoshino-gawa (吉野川) - Kochi, Ehime, Tokushima, Kagawa
- Naka-gawa (那賀川) - Tokushima
- Doki-gawa (土器川) - Kagawa
- Shigenobu-gawa (重信川) - Ehime
- Hiji-kawa (肱川) - Ehime
- Monobe-kawa (物部川) - Kochi
- Niyodo-gawa (仁淀川) - Ehime, Kochi
- Shimanto-gawa (四万十川) - Ehime, Kochi

== Kyūshū ==
First class rivers under control of Kyushu Regional Bureau (九州地方整備局)

- Onga-gawa (遠賀川) - Fukuoka
- Yamakuni-gawa (山国川) - Oita, Fukuoka
- Chikugo-gawa (筑後川) - Kumamoto, Oita, Fukuoka, Saga
- Yabe-gawa (矢部川) - Fukuoka
- Matsuura-gawa (松浦川) - Saga
- Rokkaku-gawa (六角川) - Saga
- Kase-gawa (嘉瀬川) - Saga
- Honmyo-gawa (本明川) - Nagasaki
- Kikuchi-gawa (菊池川) - Kumamoto
- Shira-kawa (白川) - Kumamoto
- Midori-gawa (緑川) - Kumamoto
- Kuma-gawa (球磨川) - Kumamoto
- Ōita-gawa (大分川) - Ōita
- Ōno-gawa (大野川) - Kumamoto, Miyazaki, Ōita
- Banjo-gawa (番匠川) - Ōita
- Gokase-gawa (五ヶ瀬川) - Kumamoto, Ōita, Miyazaki
- Omaru-gawa (小丸川) - Miyazaki
- Ōyodo-gawa (大淀川) - Kagoshima, Kumamoto, Miyazaki
- Sendai-gawa (川内川) - Miyazaki, Kagoshima
- Kimotsuki-gawa (肝属川, 肝付川) - Kagoshima

== See also ==
- Geography of Japan
