= Koyoshi River =

Koyoshi River 子吉川
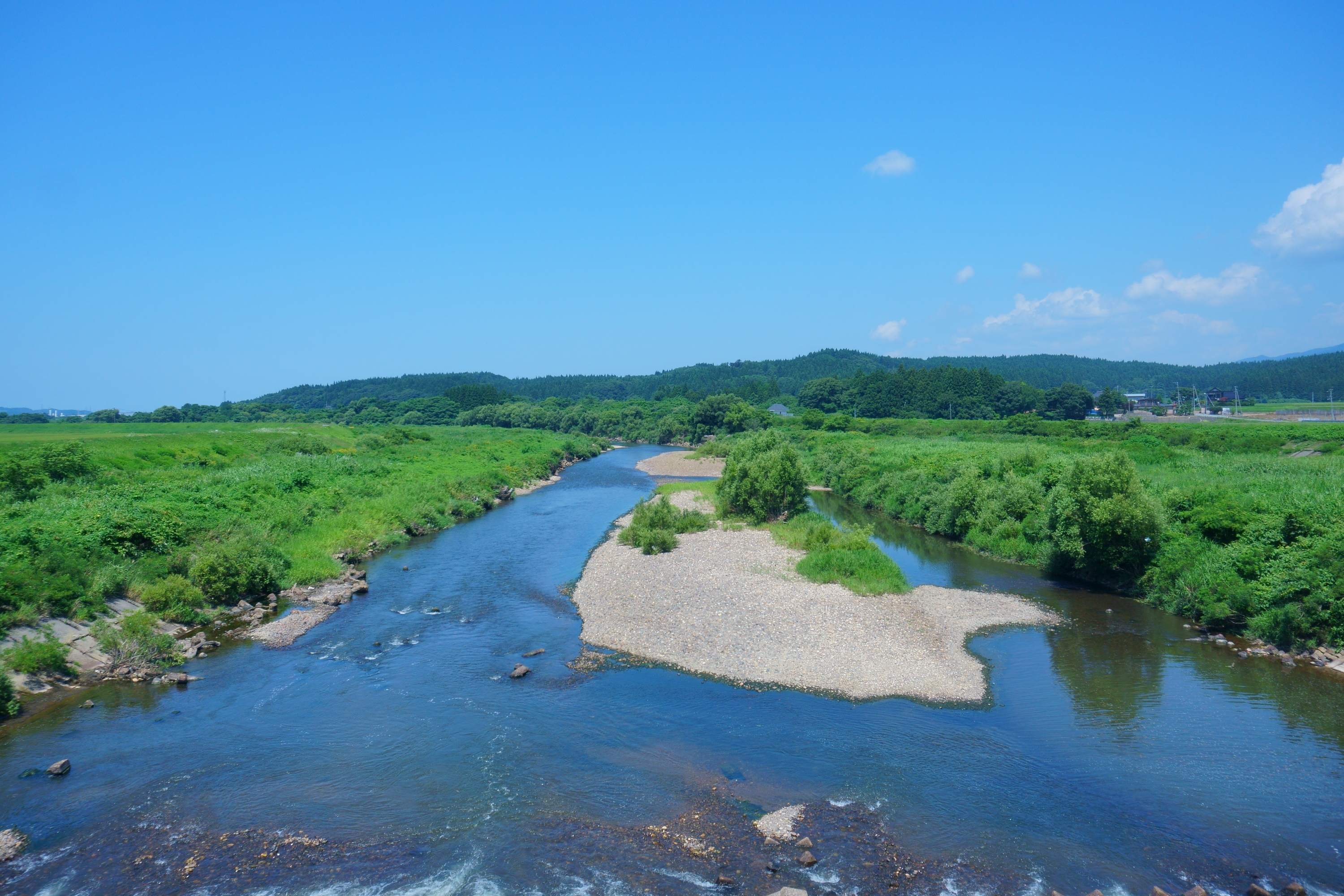
- Koyoshi River in 2021

- Location within Japan

Location
- Country: Japan
- State: Honshu
- Region: Akita

Physical characteristics
- Source: Mount Chōkai
  - elevation: 2,236 m (7,336 ft)
- Mouth: Sea of Japan
  - coordinates: 39°23′26″N 140°00′51″E
- Length: 61 km (38 mi)
- Basin size: 1,190 km^{2} (460 sq mi)

Koyoshi River (Japanese: 子吉川(こよしがわ), Hepburn: koyoshigawa) is a river in Akita Prefecture, Japan. It originates from Mount Chōkai, where the border of Akita Prefecture and Yamagata Prefecture is located, and flows through Yurihonjō and finally into Sea of Japan. The headstream of the river is called Chōkai River (鳥海川, chōkaigawa). It has the third largest drainage area of the class A rivers that flow through Akita Prefecture, after Omono River and Yoneshiro River.
