= Kakehashi =

Kakehashi (written: 梯 lit. "suspension bridge") is a Japanese surname. Notable people with the surname include:

- Ikutaro Kakehashi (梯 郁太郎) (born 1930), Japanese businessman

== Fictional characters ==
- Mirai Kakehashi (架橋 明日), the main protagonist of Platinum End

== See also ==
- Kakehashi River (梯川, Kakehashi-gawa), river in Komatsu, Ishikawa Prefecture, Japan
