= Kibishima River =

River in Japan

Coordinates: 35°42′43″N 136°57′08″E

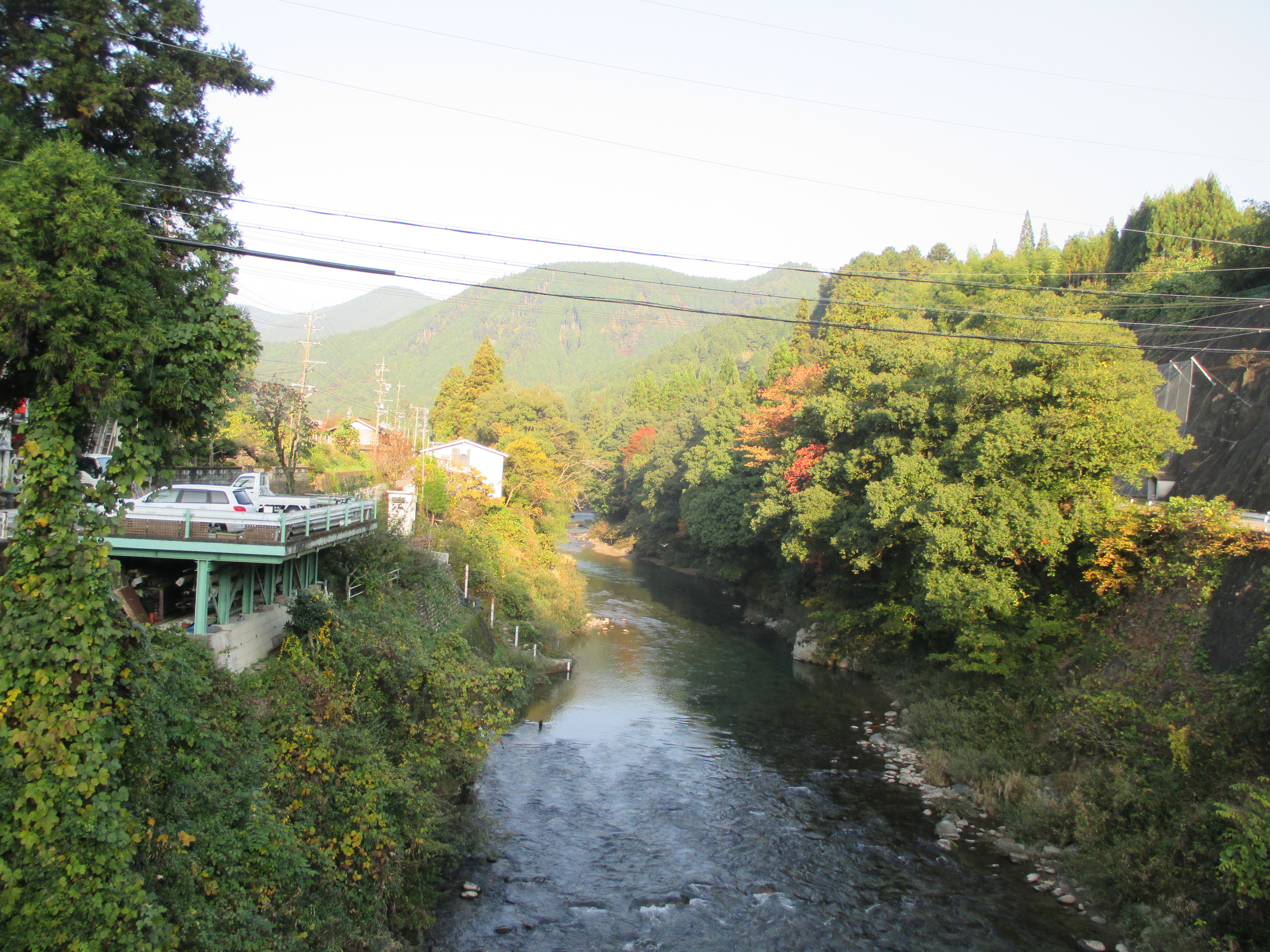
Kibishima river at Gujo

Kibishima river (Japanese:亀尾島川) is a first-class river in the Kiso river system located in central Japan. It flows through Gujo City in Gifu Prefecture. The river originates in the Koshimi Mountains (altitude: 1,148 m; 3,766 ft) on the border between Gifu and Fukui Prefecture, flows southeast into Hachiman-cho, Gujo City, joins the Nabi River from the right bank, and then changes its flow to the east-southeast. The catchment area is 120.4 km^{2} (46.5 sq mi) and has a river length of 24.1 km (15.0 mi) up to the Nagara River.

== Water usage ==
- Uchigaya Dam (内ケ谷ダム) is under construction for flood control.

== See also ==
- List of rivers of Japan
