= Classification of rivers in Japan =

System used by the Japanese government to classify rivers

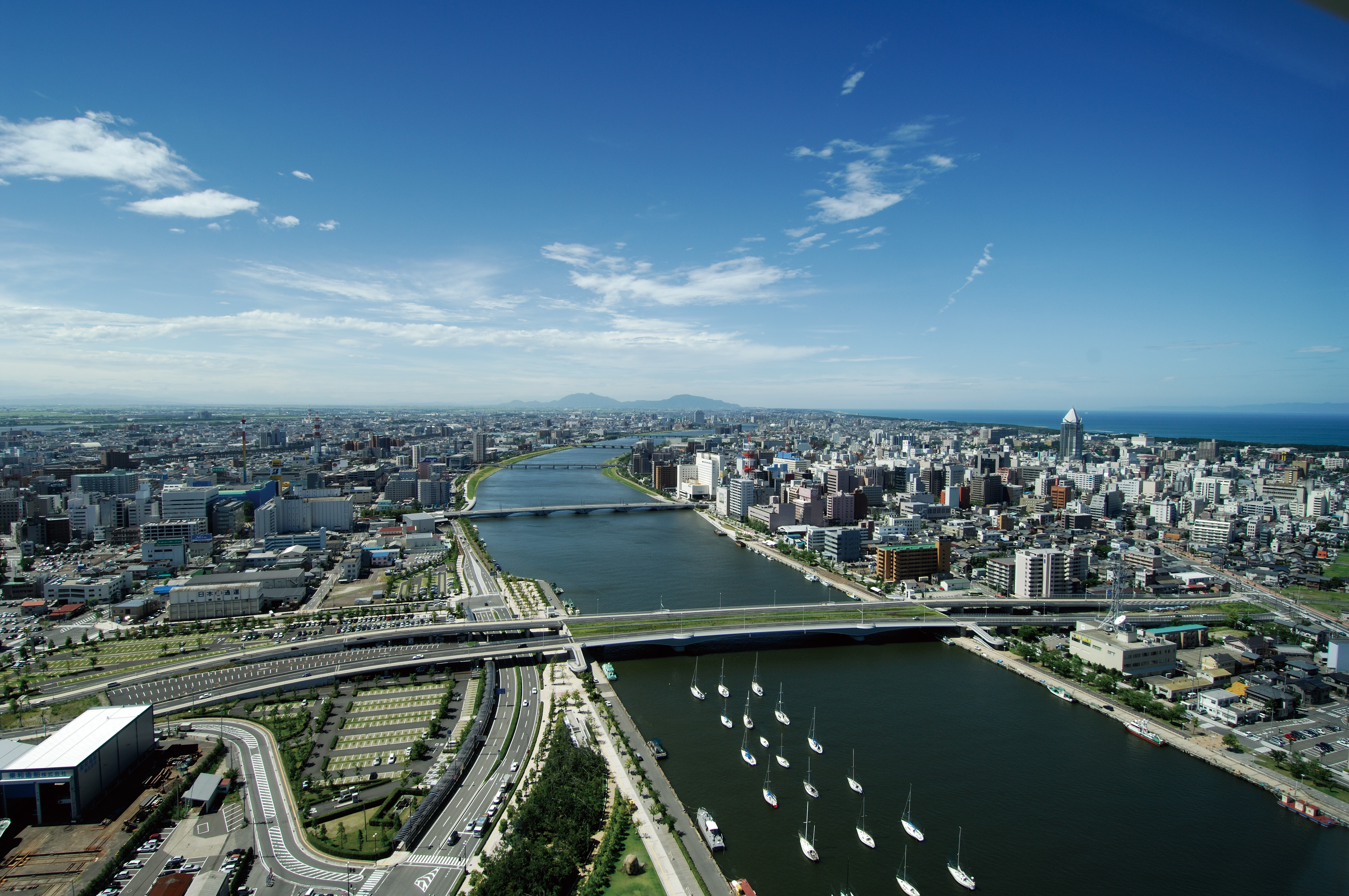
Shinano River, the longest river in Japan, designated as Class A

Rivers in Japan are classified according to criteria set by the River Act (河川法, Kasen Hō), which was introduced in 1967. Rivers are classified by the Ministry of Land, Infrastructure, Transport and Tourism (MLIT).

== River Act ==
=== Pre-1967 river administration ===
At the beginning of the Meiji era, river construction mainly consisted of low water construction such as securing water for boat transportation and irrigation, but after the middle of the Meiji era, boat transportation declined with the spread of railways, and on the other hand, development of river coasts exacerbated damage from floods. As the number of floods increased, a shift was made to high water construction to prevent flooding by building levees.

The old system was enacted in 1891 following the proclamation of the Meiji Constitution. As Japan's first modern public property management system, a systematic legal system for river management was established. However, due to the background of its enactment, the old River Law had strong overtones of control by state power, and, reflecting the social situation at the time, placed more emphasis on flood control than water utilization.

=== New River Act ===
Over the following 70 years, due to post-war social and economic development, the use of river water for hydroelectric power generation and industrial water increased rapidly and because of inconsistencies that had arisen in the system implemented by the old River Act, the new River Act was enacted in 1962, with the following changes:

- All rivers and river systems are classified into four classes
- Entities in charge of rivers are required to formulate a plan for integrated water management
- Establishment of regulations related to water use
- Establishment of regulations to prevent disasters caused by dams

=== 1997 amendment ===
The River Act was amended in 1997, changing its text to have a greater emphasis on conservation of natural environments, and the consultation and participation of local residents in forming water management plans.

=== Impact ===
The 1967 River Act simplified the management of waterways in Japan by merging previously separate systems into one unified water management system. Before this, the river management system in Japan was seen as heavy-handed and overly bureaucratic. Especially post-1997 amendment, there is now greater community involvement when formulating plans regarding rivers and water management.

== Class A rivers ==
Class A river system (一級水系, Ikkyū suikei) is a designation applied to rivers systems deemed to be important to the economy of the nation as a whole, as well as those deemed important to the conservation of nature within Japan. There are currently 109 river systems with this designation. If a river system is designated Class A, all the constituent rivers are also designated as such. Therefore, Class B rivers cannot coexist with Class A rivers in the same river system. This designation is also called First Class.

Class A river (一級河川, Ikkyū kasen) is a designation which applies to important individual rivers. There are 13,994 rivers with this designation.

Generally speaking, areas surrounding Class A rivers will suffer greater damage in the event of a flood.

=== List of Class A river systems ===
The number of dams only includes existing and unestablished dams that meet the criteria (15 metres (49 ft) or more in bank height) of the River Law. The management entity is irrelevant. The number in parentheses is the number of dams on the main river, excluding tributaries. The number of dams does not always exceed the number of hydroelectric plants because plants with intake weirs less than 15 metres (49 ft) high are not considered dams. The acronym BOD refers to biochemical oxygen demand.

Note: Okinawa has no Class A rivers.

==== Hokkaidō Development Bureau ====
Name	Japanese	Main stream length (km)	Basin area (km^{2})	Basin management	Basin area population	Tributaries	Average annual flow rate (m^{3}/s)	BOD (ppm)	Dams	Hydroelectric plants
Teshio	天塩川	256	5,590	Hokkaidō	94,000	160	134.52	0.7	14 (2)	3
Shokotsu	渚滑川	84	1,240	Hokkaidō	28,000	25	29.33	1.0	0	2
Yūbetsu	湧別川	87	1,480	Hokkaidō	36,000	17	32.45	1.7	1 (0)	3
Tokoro	常呂川	120	1,930	Hokkaidō	142,000	57	22.64	2.6	2 (1)	0
Abashiri	網走川	115	1,380	Hokkaidō	94,000	25	14.02	2.5	1 (0)	2
Rumoi	留萌川	44	270	Hokkaidō	28,000	13	11.84	1.5	3 (0)	0
Ishikari	石狩川	268	14,330	Hokkaidō	2,500,000	464	133.18	1.1	83 (1)	34
Shiribetsu	尻別川	126	1,640	Hokkaidō	38,000	40	68.41	0.4	3 (0)	7
Shiribeshi-Toshibetsu	後志利別川	80	720	Hokkaidō	16,000	29	23.69	0.5	2 (1)	8
Mu	鵡川	135	1,270	Hokkaidō	13,000	20	38.54	0.6	2 (0)	1
Saru	沙流川	104	1,350	Hokkaidō	13,000	28	48.24	0.6	4 (2)	4
Kushiro	釧路川	154	2,510	Hokkaidō	177,000	38	26.32	1.7	0	0
Tokachi	十勝川	156	9,010	Hokkaidō	340,000	209	85.36	1.7	14 (3)	16

==== Tōhoku Development Bureau ====
Name	Japanese	Main stream length (km)	Basin area (km^{2})	Basin management	Basin area population	Tributaries	Average annual flow rate (m^{3}/s)	BOD (ppm)	Dams	Hydroelectric plants
Iwaki	岩木川	102	2,540	Aomori	482,400	97	76.07	1.6	21 (2)	5
Takase	高瀬川	64	867	Aomori	80,372	23	50.10	0.9	3 (1)	0
Mabechi	馬淵川	142	2,050	Iwate, Aomori	188,000	30	47.62	1.1	6 (0)	5
Kitakami	北上川	249	10,150	Iwate, Miyagi	1,389,000	302	318.42	1.1	53 (1)	33
Naruse	鳴瀬川	89	1,130	Miyagi	190,000	61	26.49	1.3	13 (1)	3
Natori	名取川	55	939	Miyagi	1,125,589	30	17.32	1.1	9 (0)	7
Abukuma	阿武隈川	239	5,400	Miyagi, Fukushima	1,380,000	197	52.22	1.9	19 (2)	25
Yoneshiro	米代川	136	4,100	Akita, Iwate	280,000	89	100.91	1.3	21 (0)	22
Omono	雄物川	133	4,710	Akita	346,481	168	259.02	1.4	34 (0)	17
Koyoshi	子吉川	61	1,190	Akita	80,000	44	60.60	1.1	12 (1)	7
Mogami	最上川	229	7,040	Yamagata	999,300	429	369.26	1.0	41 (1)	26
Aka	赤川	70	857	Yamagata	109,294	44	65.68	1.0	5 (1)	10

==== Kantō Development Bureau ====
Name	Japanese	Main stream length (km)	Basin area (km^{2})	Basin management	Basin area population	Tributaries	Average annual flow rate (m^{3}/s)	BOD (ppm)	Dams	Hydroelectric plants
Kuji	久慈川	124	1,490	Fukushima, Ibaraki	201,981	53	23.58	0.8	1 (0)	7
Naka	那珂川	150	3,270	Tochigi, Ibaraki	912,217	197	74.43	0.9	22 (2)	12
Tone	利根川	322	16,840	Gunma, Nagano, Tochigi, Saitama, Tokyo, Chiba, Ibaraki	12,140,000	819	237.10	2.5	70 (4)	98
Ara	荒川	173	2,940	Saitama, Tokyo	9,300,000	127	27.77	4.4	13 (2)	11
Tama	多摩川	138	1,240	Yamanashi, Tokyo, Kanagawa	4,250,000	52	40.28	1.7	2 (2)	5
Tsurumi	鶴見川	43	235	Tokyo, Kanagawa	1,840,000	11	7.83	8.0	0	0
Sagami	相模川	113	1,680	Yamanashi, Kanagawa	1,200,000	104	－	2.0	10 (3)	20
Fuji	富士川	128	3,990	Nagano, Yamanashi, Shizuoka	1,600,000	555	58.91	2.3	19 (0)	71

==== Hokuriku Development Bureau ====
Name	Japanese	Main stream length (km)	Basin area (km^{2})	Basin management	Basin area population	Tributaries	Average annual flow rate (m^{3}/s)	BOD (ppm)	Dams	Hydroelectric plants
Ara	荒川	73	1,150	Yamagata, Niigata	40,000	61	115.00	0.6	5 (3)	6
Agano	阿賀野川	210	7,710	Fukushima, Gunma, Niigata	590,000	243	401.55	0.6	62 (8)	60
Shinano	信濃川	367	11,900	Nagano, Gunma, Niigata	2,950,000	880	503.15	1.0	90 (1)	122
Seki	関川	64	1,140	Nagano, Niigata	210,000	78	50.32	1.5	5 (1)	16
Hime	姫川	60	722	Nagano, Niigata	20,000	47	44.07	0.5	0	19
Kurobe	黒部川	85	682	Toyama	71,000	25	37.00	0.8	6 (5)	18
Jōganji	常願寺川	56	368	Toyama	30,000	49	16.23	0.6	8 (1)	27
Jinzū	神通川	120	2,720	Gifu, Toyama	380,000	105	183.65	1.4	25 (7)	60
Shō	庄川	115	1,180	Gifu, Toyama	28,032	48	47.72	1.0	18 (9)	27
Oyabe	小矢部川	68	667	Ishikawa, Toyama	300,000	64	27.99	1.5	14 (2)	5
Tedori	手取川	72	809	Ishikawa	40,000	35	77.21	0.5	7 (2)	24
Kakehashi	梯川	42	271	Ishikawa	110,000	13	18.02	1.0	1 (1)	0

==== Chūbu Development Bureau ====
Name	Japanese	Main stream length (km)	Basin area (km^{2})	Basin management	Basin area population	Tributaries	Average annual flow rate (m^{3}/s)	BOD (ppm)	Dams	Hydroelectric plants
Kano	狩野川	46	852	Shizuoka	640,000	76	21.40	1.5	0	7
Abe	安倍川	51	567	Shizuoka	170,000	36	41.44	0.8	0	2
Ōi	大井川	168	1,280	Shizuoka	90,000	39	76.40	0.5	14 (7)	15
Kiku	菊川	28	158	Shizuoka	70,000	25	2.21	1.8	2 (0)	0
Tenryū	天竜川	213	5,090	Nagano, Aichi, Shizuoka	720,000	332	239.67	0.5	17 (5)	51
Toyo	豊川	77	724	Aichi	210,000	27	28.23	0.6	9 (1)	3
Yahagi	矢作川 or 矢矧川	118	1,830	Nagano, Gifu, Aichi	690,000	94	43.99	1.0	25 (3)	25
Shōnai	庄内川	96	1,010	Gifu, Aichi	2,500,000	76	26.21	4.7	18 (0)	2
Kiso	木曽川	229	9,100	Nagano, Gifu, Shiga, Aichi, Mie	1,700,000	391	291.05	0.7	64 (9)	77
Suzuka	鈴鹿川	38	323	Mie	110,000	46	11.23	1.4	0	0
Kumozu	雲出川	55	550	Mie	90,000	40	14.36	1.6	6 (0)	1
Kushida	櫛田川	85	461	Mie	40,000	68	20.55	0.7	4 (0)	5
Miya	宮川	91	920	Mie	140,000	55	45.70	0.5	5 (2)	6

==== Kinki Development Bureau ====
Name	Japanese	Main stream length (km)	Basin area (km^{2})	Basin management	Basin area population	Tributaries	Average annual flow rate (m^{3}/s)	BOD (ppm)	Dams	Hydroelectric plants
Kuzuryū	九頭竜川	116	2,930	Gifu, Fukui	666,225	147	108.26	0.8	20 (3)	25
Kita	北川	30	211	Shiga, Fukui	21,389	12	11.68	0.6	1 (0)	1
Yura	由良川	146	1,880	Hyōgo, Kyōto	300,000	138	52.09	0.8	22 (3)	6
Yodo	淀川	75	8,240	Shiga, Kyōto, Ōsaka, Mie, Nara, Hyōgo	11,650,000	965	267.51	1.9	66 (1)	34
Yamato	大和川	68	1,070	Nara, Ōsaka	2,150,000	178	23.94	3.3	11 (1)	0
Maruyama	円山川	68	1,300	Hyōgo	150,557	97	37.40	0.9	7 (0)	5
Kako	加古川	96	1,730	Hyōgo	640,000	130	45.89	2.6	19 (0)	0
Ibo	揖保川	70	810	Hyōgo	200,000	47	29.04	0.8	4 (0)	6
Kino	紀の川	136	1,750	Nara, Wakayama	689,000	181	58.77	2.1	9 (2)	6
Kumano	熊野川	183	2,360	Nara, Mie, Wakayama	84,000	103	163.54	1.3	11 (5)	30

==== Chūgoku Development Bureau ====
Name	Japanese	Main stream length (km)	Basin area (km^{2})	Basin management	Basin area population	Tributaries	Average annual flow rate (m^{3}/s)	BOD (ppm)	Dams	Hydroelectric plants
Sendai	千代川	52	1,190	Tottori	200,000	87	61.68	0.8	6 (0)	17
Tenjin	天神川	32	490	Tottori	65,500	32	24.03	1.2	8 (0)	8
Hino	日野川	77	870	Tottori	60,800	56	33.55	1.1	12 (0)	14
Hii	斐伊川	153	2,070	Shimane, Tottori	435,000	227	40.26	1.4	24 (2)	13
Gōno	江の川	194	3,900	Hiroshima, Shimane	202,000	293	75.17	0.8	20 (2)	24
Takatsu	高津川	81	1,090	Shimane	38,600	92	51.88	0.7	4 (0)	5
Yoshii	吉井川	133	2,110	Okayama	294,000	215	61.16	2.0	30 (1)	18
Asahi	旭川	142	1,810	Okayama	335,000	147	57.01	1.8	25 (3)	9
Takahashi	高梁川	111	2,670	Okayama, Hiroshima	273,000	121	61.81	2.5	29 (1)	19
Ashida	芦田川	86	860	Okayama, Hiroshima	269,000	82	12.73	4.0	18 (2)	3
Ōta	太田川	103	1,710	Hiroshima	980,000	73	78.81	0.9	11 (2)	24
Oze	小瀬川	59	340	Hiroshima, Yamaguchi	26,500	23	12.05	2.6	4 (2)	6
Saba	佐波川	56	460	Yamaguchi	31,100	32	18.69	0.7	4 (1)	1

==== Shikoku Development Bureau ====
Name	Japanese	Main stream length (km)	Basin area (km^{2})	Basin management	Basin area population	Tributaries	Average annual flow rate (m^{3}/s)	BOD (ppm)	Dams	Hydroelectric plants
Yoshino	吉野川	194	3,750	Kōchi, Ehime, Tokushima, Kagawa	641,000	356	107.67	0.8	23 (4)	32
Naka	那賀川	125	874	Tokushima	59,000	75	62.88	0.7	4 (3)	5
Doki	土器川	33	140	Kagawa	35,000	11	1.83	3.9	2 (0)	0
Shigenobu	重信川	36	445	Ehime	233,000	75	2.24	5.0	8 (0)	1
Hiji	肱川	103	1,210	Ehime	112,000	475	37.61	1.0	8 (2)	4
Monobe	物部川	71	508	Kōchi	40,000	35	30.78	0.7	4 (3)	6
Niyodo	仁淀川	124	1,560	Ehime, Kōchi	105,000	166	100.07	0.7	5 (3)	18
Shimanto	四万十川	196	2,270	Ehime, Kōchi	100,000	319	121.02	0.6	5 (0)	6

==== Kyūshū Development Bureau ====
Name	Japanese	Main stream length (km)	Basin area (km^{2})	Basin management	Basin area population	Tributaries	Average annual flow rate (m^{3}/s)	BOD (ppm)	Dams	Hydroelectric plants
Onga	遠賀川	61	1,026	Fukuoka	666,406	74	31.47	2.6	23 (0)	1
Yamakuni	山国川	56	540	Ōita, Fukuoka	36,801	39	20.81	0.9	1 (0)	1
Chikugo	筑後川	143	2,863	Kumamoto, Ōita, Fukuoka, Saga	1,090,777	235	95.09	1.6	29 (2)	22
Yabe	矢部川	61	647	Fukuoka	182,889	23	21.54	1.1	17 (2)	4
Matsuura River	松浦川	47	446	Fukuoka, Saga	97,818	80	12.46	2.4	22 (0)	3
Rokkaku	六角川	47	341	Saga	122,827	79	4.36	2.1	9 (1)	0
Kase	嘉瀬川	57	368	Saga	133,412	51	14.10	1.0	3 (2)	8
Honmyō	本明川	21	87	Nagasaki	54,583	18	2.11	1.8	2 (1)	0
Kikuchi	菊池川	71	996	Kumamoto	208,694	68	39.56	1.1	1 (0)	4
Shira	白川	74	480	Kumamoto	131,375	16	25.39	2.5	3 (1)	4
Midori	緑川	76	1,100	Kumamoto	517,189	59	36.17	2.4	4 (2)	11
Kuma	球磨川	115	1,880	Kumamoto	137,375	82	119.92	1.4	11 (4)	20
Ōita	大分川	55	650	Ōita	252,808	48	22.33	1.4	7 (1)	14
Ōno	大野川	107	1,465	Kumamoto, Miyazaki, Ōita	206,818	138	61.36	0.6	14 (0)	10
Banjō	番匠川	38	464	Kumamoto, Miyazaki, Ōita	56,527	52	12.17	1.1	5 (0)	0
Gokase	五ヶ瀬川	106	1,820	Miyazaki	127,638	102	60.94	1.1	8 (2)	22
Omaru	小丸川	75	474	Miyazaki	32,616	16	32.76	0.5	8 (4)	5
Ōyodo	大淀川	107	2,230	Kagoshima, Miyazaki	601,321	134	107.61	1.3	16 (2)	12
Sendai	川内川	137	1,600	Kumamoto, Miyazaki, Kagoshima	195,944	129	91.09	0.7	4 (3)	5
Kimotsuki	肝属川	34	485	Kagoshima	115,578	36	31.69	4.5	2 (0)	3

== Class B rivers ==
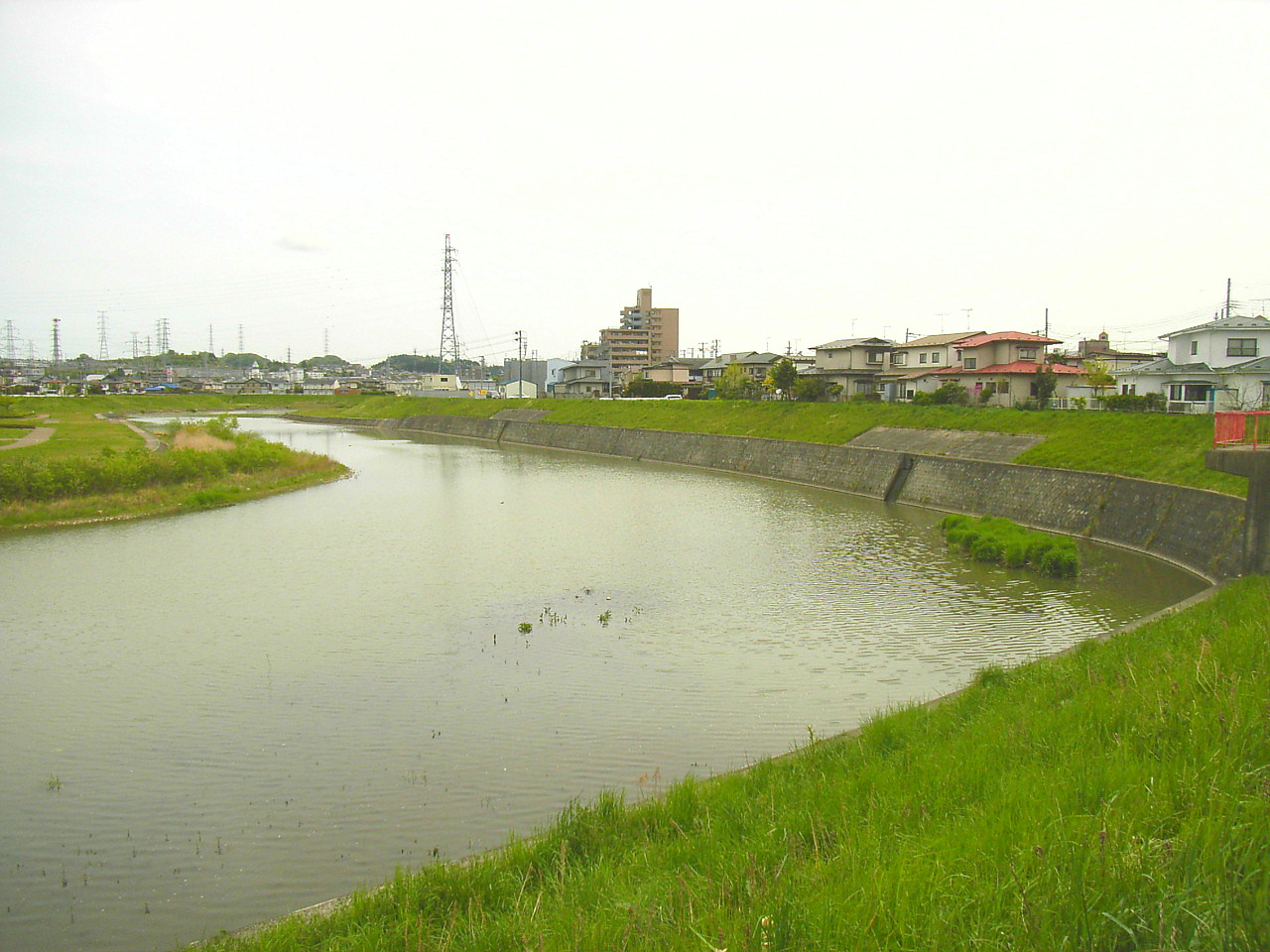
The Nanakita River, a Class B river in Miyagi Prefecture

Smaller or less important rivers are designated as Class B river systems (二級水系, Nikyū Suikei). They are nominated and managed by the local governments at the prefecture level, but reported to and concurred with by the central government. There are 7,090 rivers with this designation. Because all of their river systems are designated Class A, there are no Class B rivers in Saitama and Shiga prefectures.

This designation is also called Second Class.

== Mutatis mutandis rivers ==
14,314 rivers in Japan are designated as mutatis mutandis rivers (準用河川, Junyō kasen), meaning that they are not assigned Class A or B designation, and are under the control of the mayor of the encompassing municipality. An example of this is the Kuno River, managed by the mayor of Odawara.

== Ordinary rivers ==
Rivers that are not designated Class A, Class B, or mutatis mutandis, are called ordinary rivers (普通河川, Futsū kasen), and the 1967 River Act does not apply to them. These do not include public sewers or agricultural canals. Management of these rivers is carried out by the local municipality.

== See also ==
- List of rivers of Japan
- Natural disasters in Japan § Floods
