= Ōita-gawa =

River in Ōita Prefecture, Japan

Ōita River
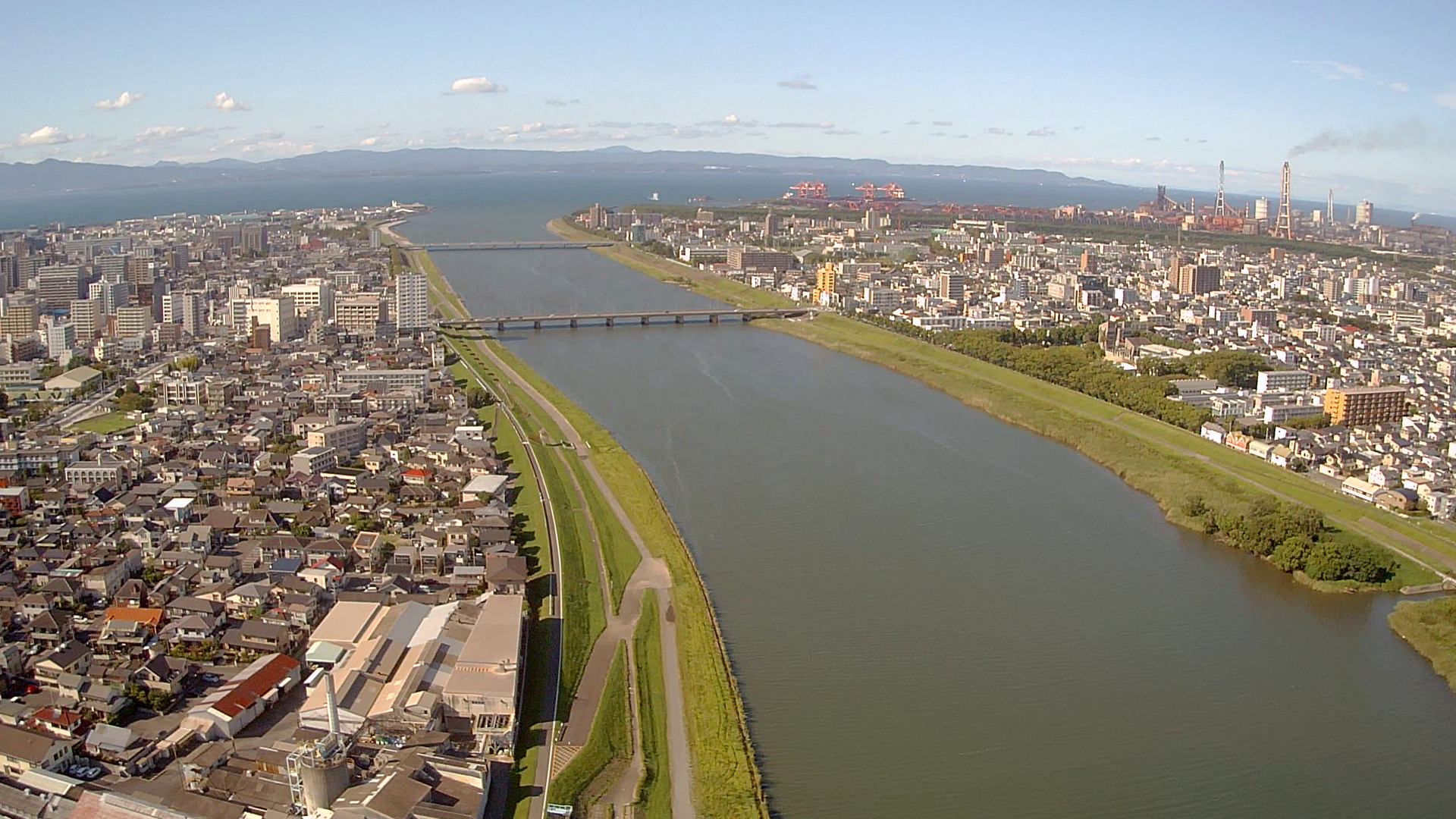
- The mouth of the Oita River, 2020

- Location within Japan
- Native name: 大分川 (Japanese)

Location
- Country: Japan
- Prefectures: Ōita

Physical characteristics
- Source
  - coordinates: 33.2639°N 131.3778°E
- Mouth: Beppu Bay
  - coordinates: 33.2626°N 131.6178°E
- Length: 55 km (34 mi)
- Basin size: 650 km^{2} (250 sq mi)

The Ōita River (大分川, Ōita-gawa) is a river in Ōita Prefecture in Japan on the island of Kyushu. It is designated as a Class A river.

The river is 55 km (34 mi) long, its basin size is 650 km^{2} (250 sq mi).

The river rises on the slopes of Mount Yufu, then flows southwest in the Yufuin basin. After passing mountain gorges it flows through the Ōita plain and discharges into Beppu Bay
