= Shikiu River =

River in Hokkaido prefecture in Japan

Coordinates: 42°29′54″N 141°16′25″E

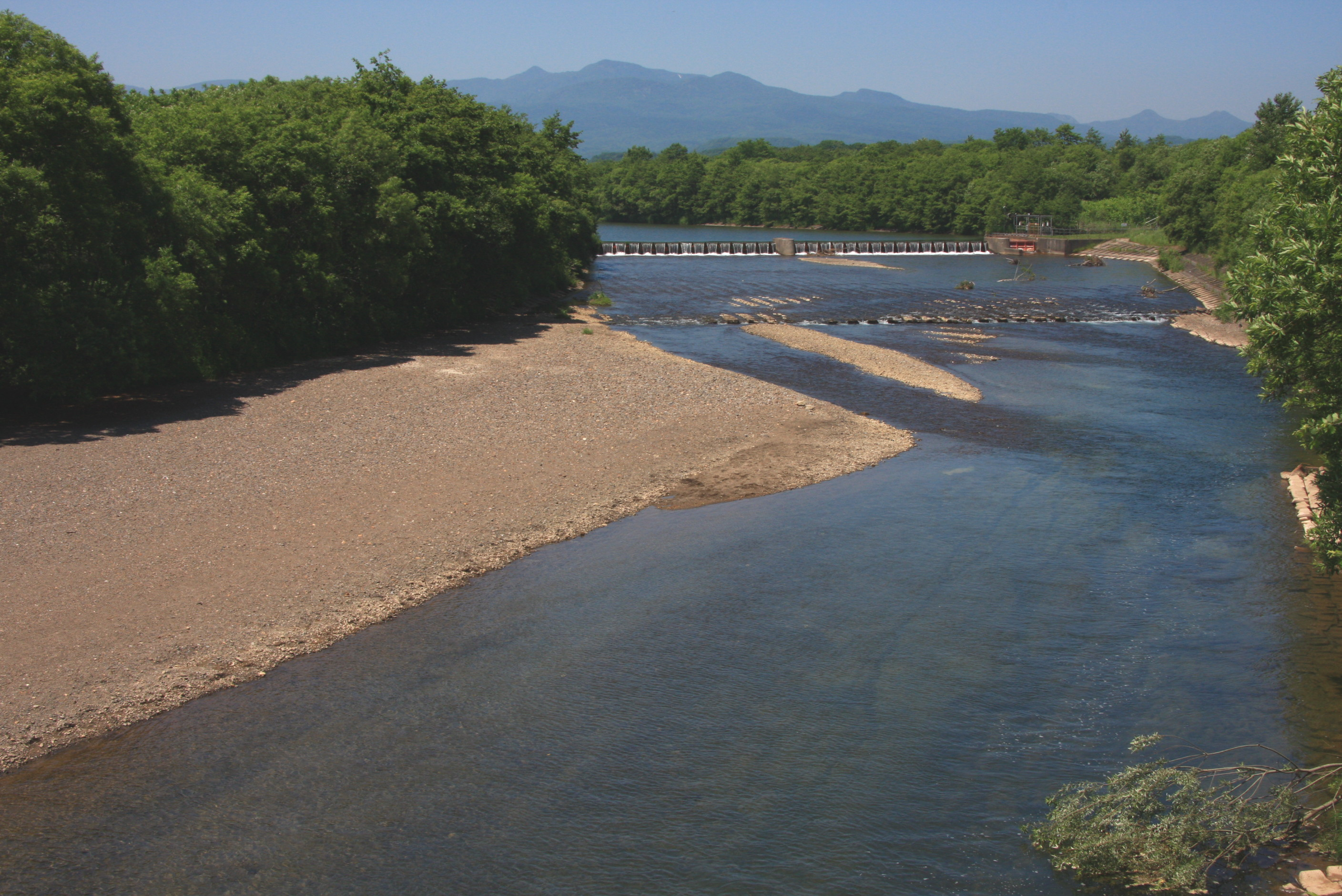

Shikiu River (敷生川, Shikiu-gawa) is a river in Hokkaido region of Japan originating from the Orofure mountain range and draining to the Pacific Ocean.

== See also ==
- List of rivers of Japan
