= Aikawa River (Miyagi, Japan) =

River in the Miyagi Prefecture, Japan

Coordinates: 38°47′16″N 141°15′48″E

The Aikawa River (Japanese: 相川) is located in the Miyagi Prefecture of Japan. The river drains about 11.6 km^{2} (4.5 sq mi). The length of the river is about 4.8 km (3.0 mi). It drains to the Kitakami River. The river flows though Fujisawa Town and Ichinoseki City. It forms a boundary between Miyagi and Iwate prefectures. Aikawa Dam has been constructed in the river to use the flow of the river.

== See also ==
- List of rivers of Japan
