= Banjo River =

River in Ōita Prefecture, Japan

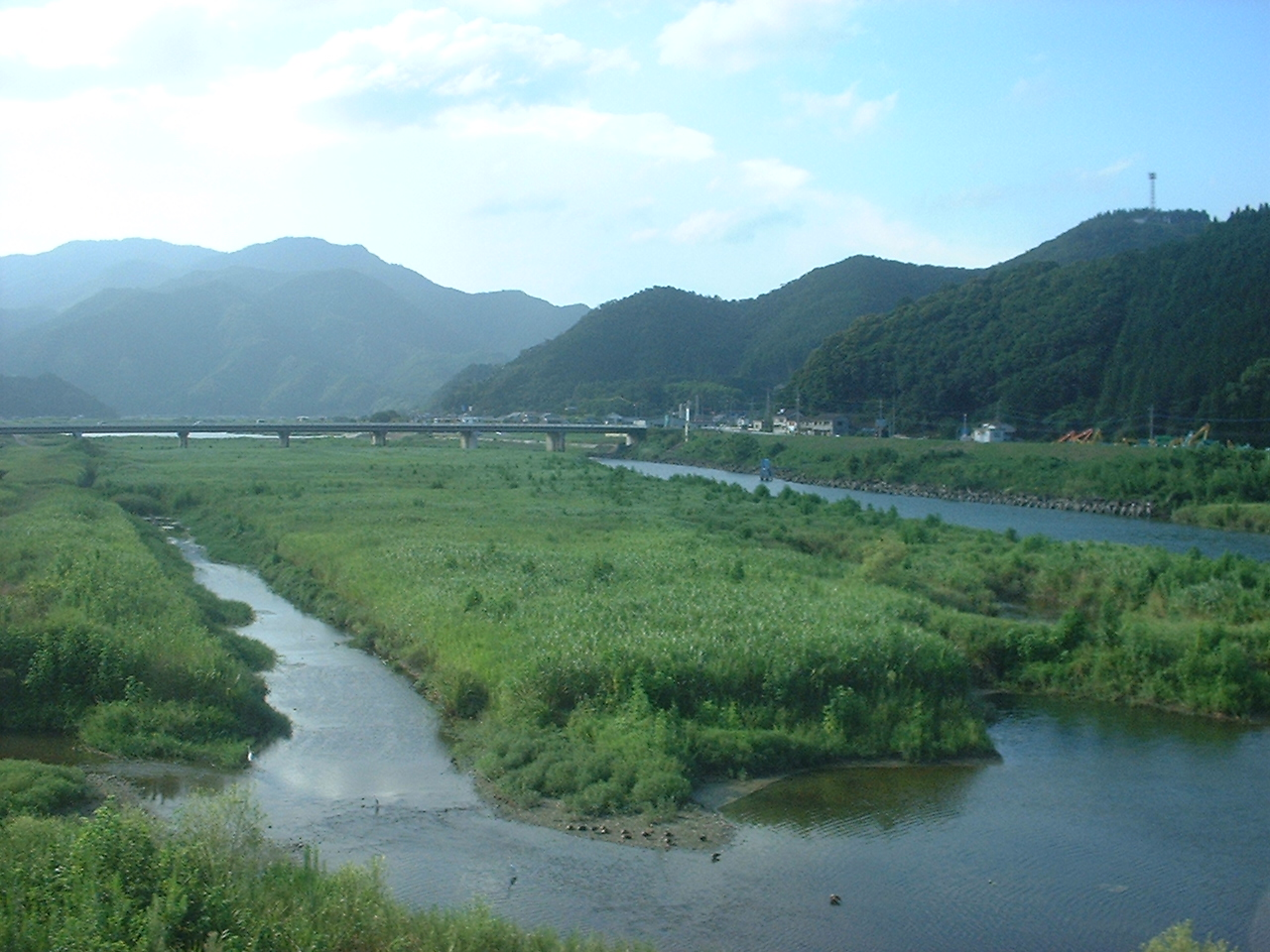

- Location within Japan
- Native name: 番匠川 (Japanese)

Location
- Country: Japan
- Prefectures: Ōita

Physical characteristics
- Source
  - coordinates: 32.9113°N 131.6201°E
- Mouth: Saiki Bay
  - coordinates: 32.9672°N 131.9276°E
- Length: 38 km (24 mi)
- Basin size: 464 km^{2} (179 sq mi)

The Banjō River (番匠川, Banjō-gawa) is a river in Ōita Prefecture in Japan on the island of Kyushu. It is designated as a Class A river.

The river is 38 km (24 mi) long, its basin size is 464 km^{2} (179 sq mi).

The river rises near the Mikuni pass, then flows eastwards. After passing mountain gorges it flows through the plain and discharges into Saiki Bay.
