= Monobe River =

River in Shikoku, Japan

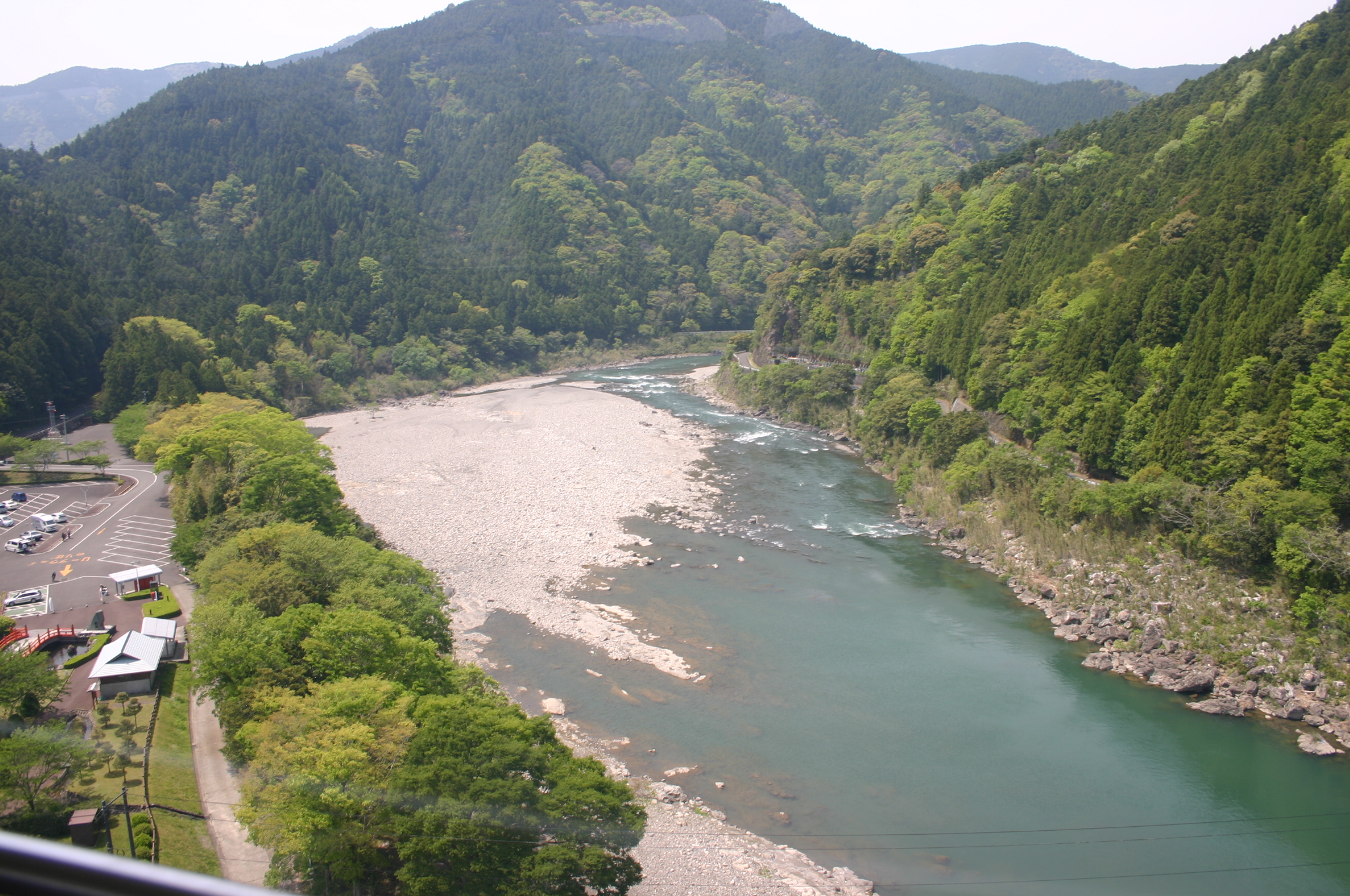

- Location within Japan
- Native name: 物部川 (Japanese)

Location
- Country: Japan
- Prefectures: Kochi

Physical characteristics
- Source
  - location: Shiraga-yama
  - coordinates: 33°49′04″N 134°01′34″E
- Mouth
  - location: Pacific Ocean
  - coordinates: 33°32′05″N 133°41′09″E
  - elevation: 0 m (0 ft)
- Length: 71 km (44 mi)
- Basin size: 508 km^{2} (196 sq mi)

Basin features
- Population: 39000

The Monobe River (物部川, Monobe-gawa) is a Class A river system on the island of Shikoku, Japan.

The Monobe River flows for 71 kilometers (44 mi). It has a watershed area of 508 square kilometers (196 sq mi), on which about 39000 people live.
