= Seki River =

Seki River 関川
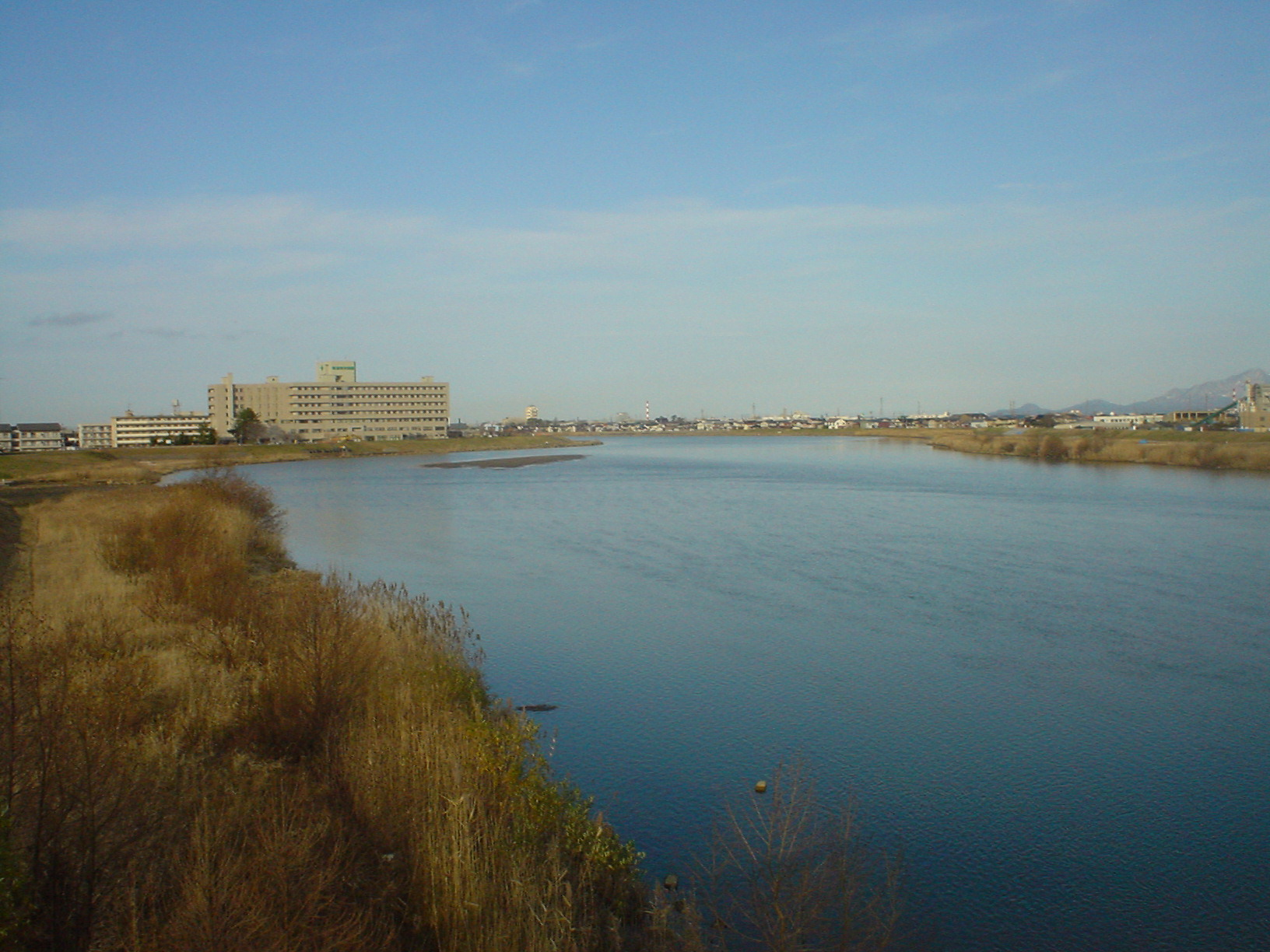
- Seki River in Niigata, Japan

- Location within Japan

Location
- Country: Japan
- State: Honshu
- Region: Niigata Prefecture, Nagano Prefecture

Physical characteristics
- Source: Niigata-Yakeyama
  - elevation: 2,400 m (7,900 ft)
- Mouth: Sea of Japan
  - coordinates: 37°10′57″N 138°14′47″E
- Length: 64 km (40 mi)
- Basin size: 1,140 km^{2} (440 sq mi)

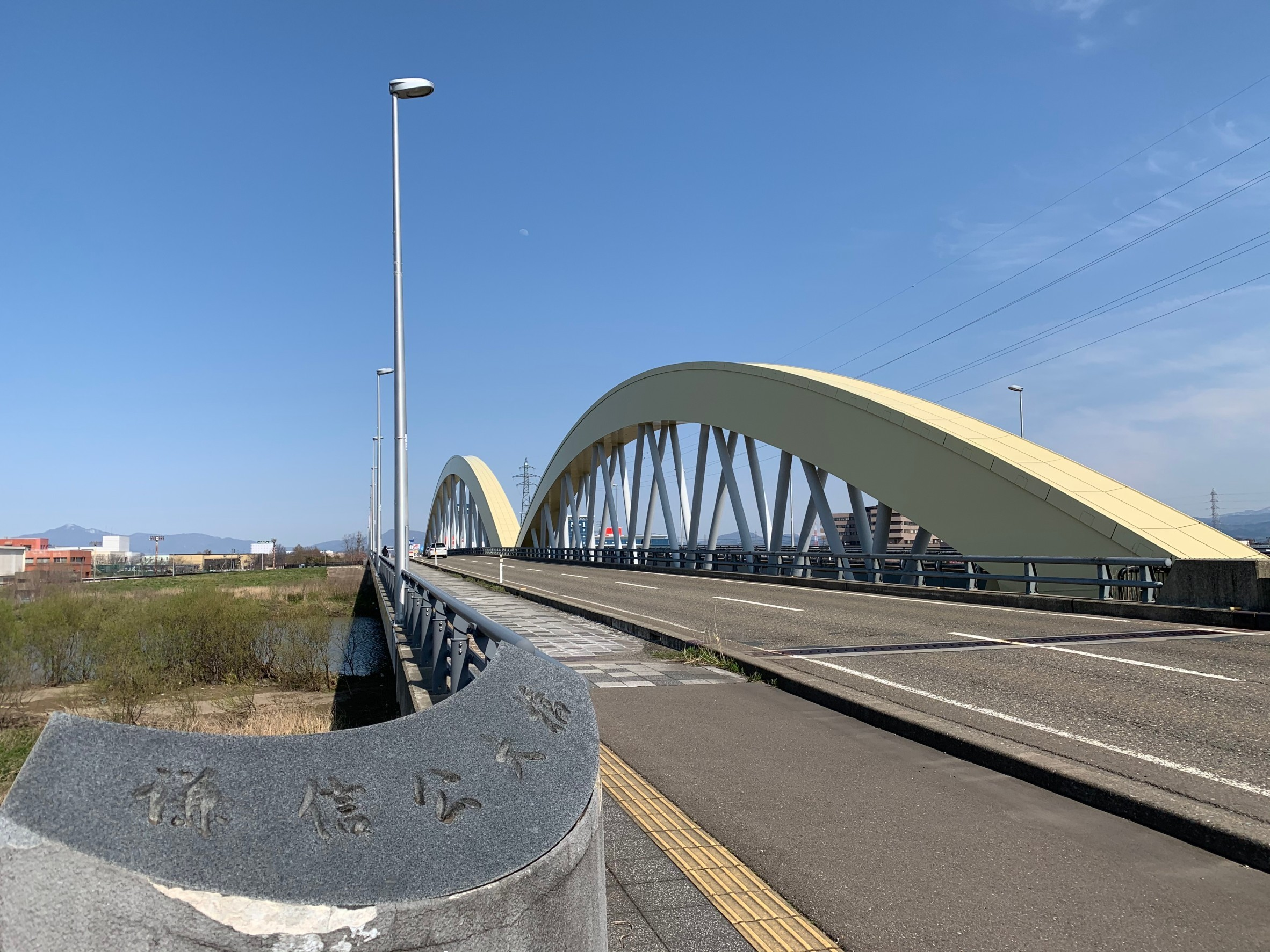
Kenshinko Bridge in Jōetsu City

The Seki River (関川) is a Class A river in Niigata Prefecture and Nagano Prefecture, Japan. Approximately 210,000 people live in the basin area.
