= Maruyama River =

Maruyama River 円山川
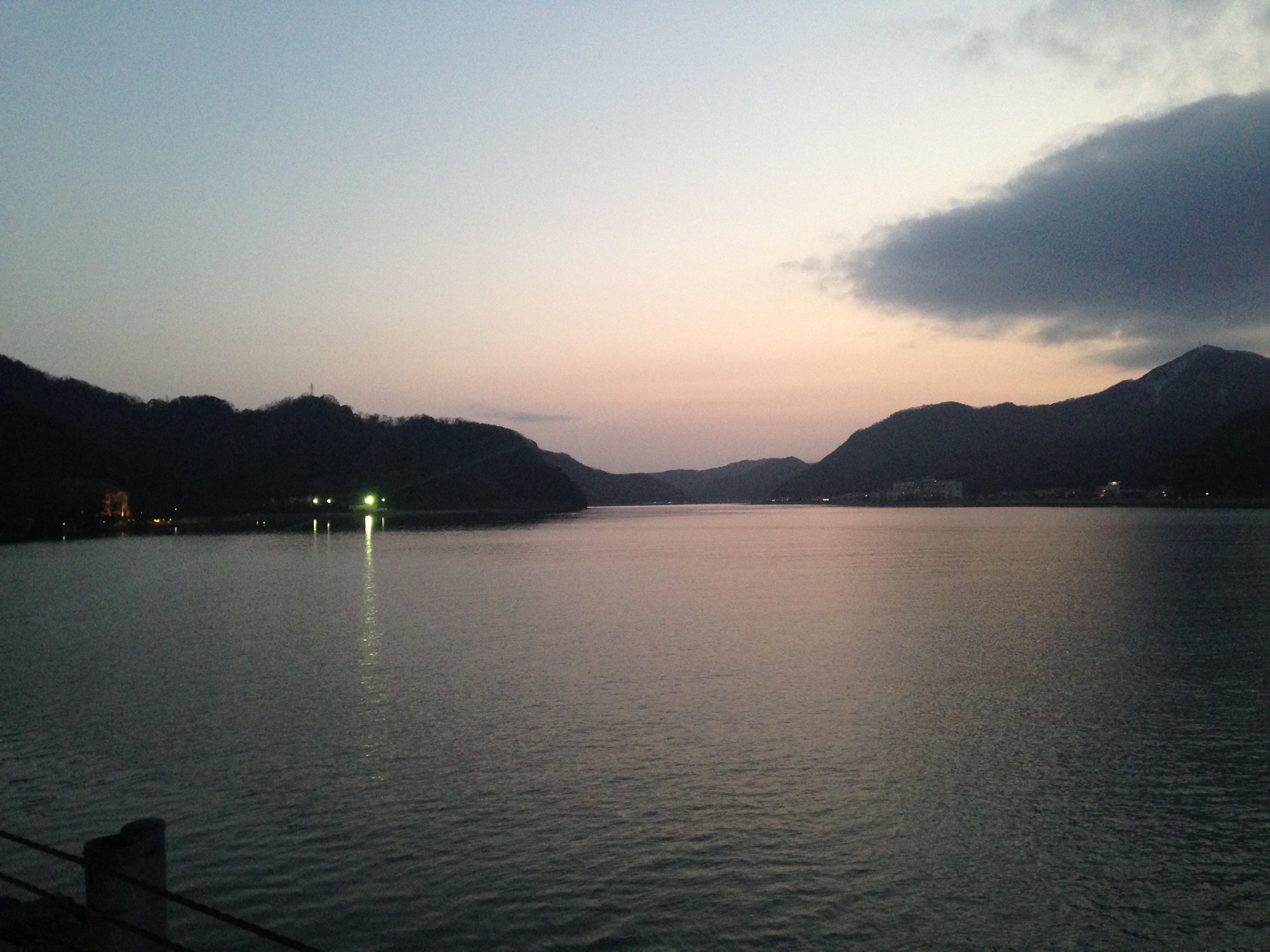
- Maruyama River in 2014

- Location within Japan

Location
- Country: Japan
- State: Honshu
- Region: Hyōgo

Physical characteristics
- Mouth: Sea of Japan
  - coordinates: 35°39′21″N 134°50′37″E
- Length: 68 km (42 mi)
- Basin size: 1,300 km^{2} (500 sq mi)

The Maruyama River is a Class A river in Hyōgo Prefecture, Japan.
