= Doki River =

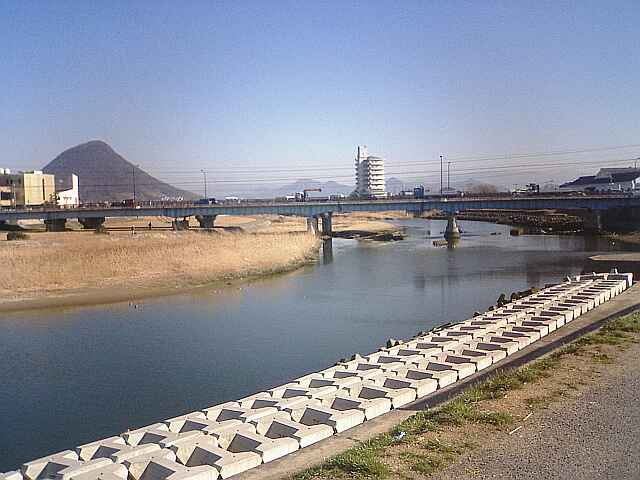
- Doki River

- Location within Japan
- Native name: 土器川 (Japanese)

Location
- Country: Japan
- Prefecture: Kagawa Prefecture

Physical characteristics
- Source
  - coordinates: 34.082006°N 133.979301°E
- Mouth: Seto Inland Sea
  - coordinates: 34.306701°N 133.798156°E}
  - elevation: 0 m
- Length: 33 km (21 mi)
- Basin size: 127 km^{2} (49 sq mi)

The Doki River (土器川 Dokigawa) is a Japanese stream that begins in the town of Mannō (Kagawa Prefecture, Nakatado District) within the Sanuki Mountains and ends in the city of Marugame.

The Doki river is 33 km (21 mi) long and the catchment area is 127 km^{2} (49 sq mi); the population of the catchment is about 39,000.

In the 20th and 21st centuries, devastating floods occurred in 1912, 1954, 1976, 1990 and 2004. The 1954 flood caused the death of 1 and 2,180 were injured. In 2004 two levees collapsed, which resulted in the submersion of 75 homes.

It is the only Class A river within Kagawa Prefecture. The river was named after Doki Village (土器村 Dokimura), which is presently known as the Doki vicinity or neighborhood within Marugame. Doki Village was located at the source of the river, and clay from there used to be made into earthenware goods (the Japanese word doki [土器] means "pottery" or "earthenware"). The central portion or the river is called haraikawa (祓川), which is a river in which worshippers purify themselves before praying.

== Geography ==
The source of the Doki River is located on Mt. Ryuo (town of Mannō, Katsuura vicinity) in the Sanuki Mountains. It flows north along Japan National Route 438 through the Marugame Plain until it reaches both the Northern Doki River and Fujimi Vicinities within Marugame, where it merges into the Seto Inland Sea. At times parts of the river dry up due to the dry climate in Kagawa and a man-made channel modification which shortened the river.
