= Kiku River =

Kiku River 菊川
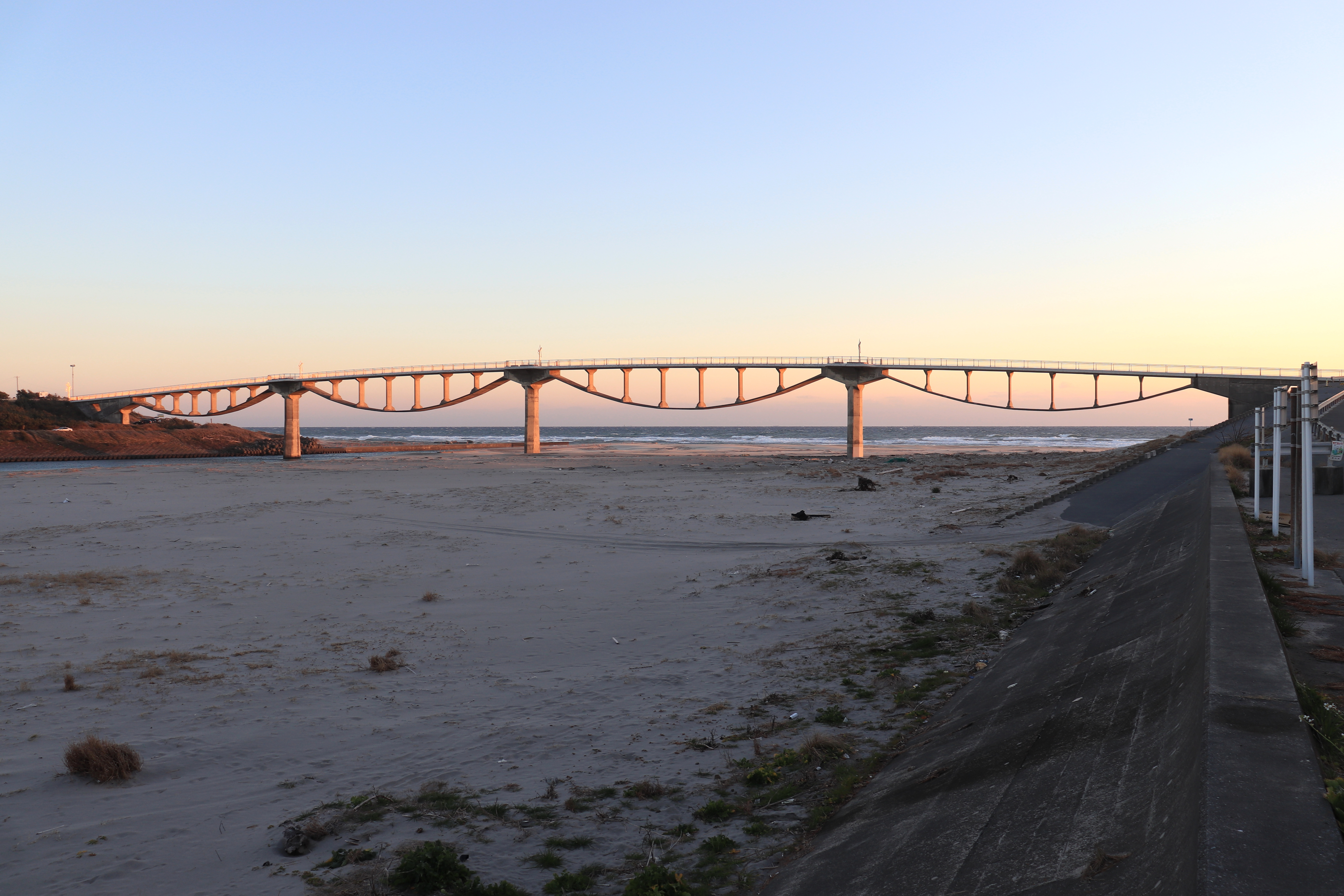

- Location within Japan

Location
- Country: Japan
- State: Honshu
- Region: Shizuoka

Physical characteristics
- Source: Awagatake
  - elevation: 532 m (1,745 ft)
- Mouth: Pacific Ocean
  - coordinates: 34°38′50″N 138°03′45″E
- Length: 28 km (17 mi)
- Basin size: 158 km^{2} (61 sq mi)

The Kiku River (Japanese: 菊川) is a A class river river in Shizuoka Prefecture, Japan.
