= Naruse River =

Naruse River 鳴瀬川
- Naruse River in 2007

- Location within Japan

Location
- Country: Japan
- State: Honshu
- Region: Miyagi
- District: Ōsaki

Physical characteristics
- Source: Mount Funagata
  - elevation: 1,500 m (4,900 ft)
- Mouth: Ishinomaki Bay
  - coordinates: 38°22′34″N 141°10′29″E
- Length: 89 km (55 mi)
- Basin size: 1,133 km^{2} (437 sq mi)

Naruse River (鳴瀬川) is a Class A river in Miyagi Prefecture, Japan.
