= Beppu Bay =

Bay in Kyushu, Japan

Coordinates: 33°19′10″N 131°37′15″E

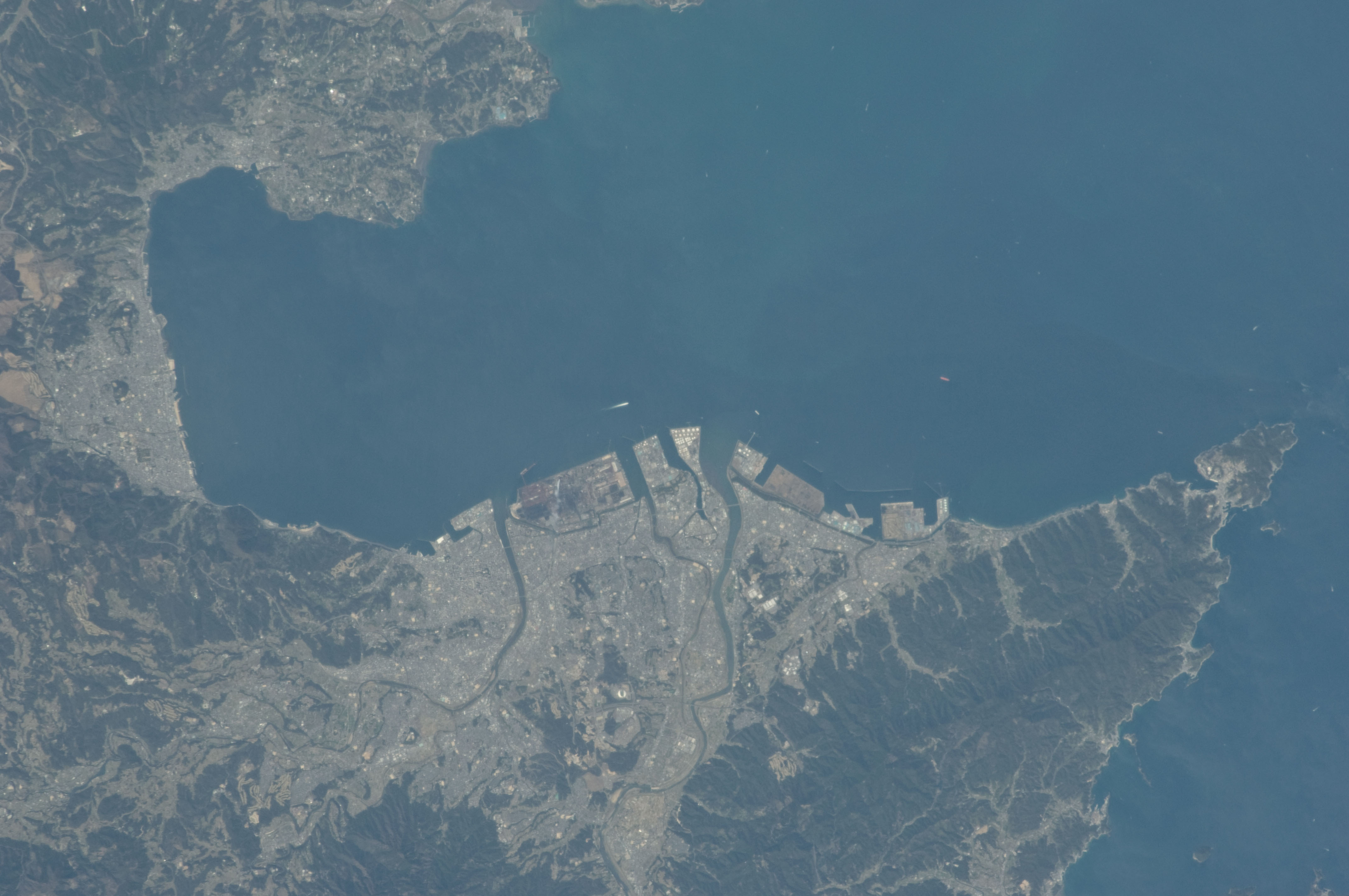
- Satellite image of Beppu Bay
- Interactive map of Beppu Bay
- Coordinates
- Location: Kyushu
- Offshore water bodies: Seto Inland Sea

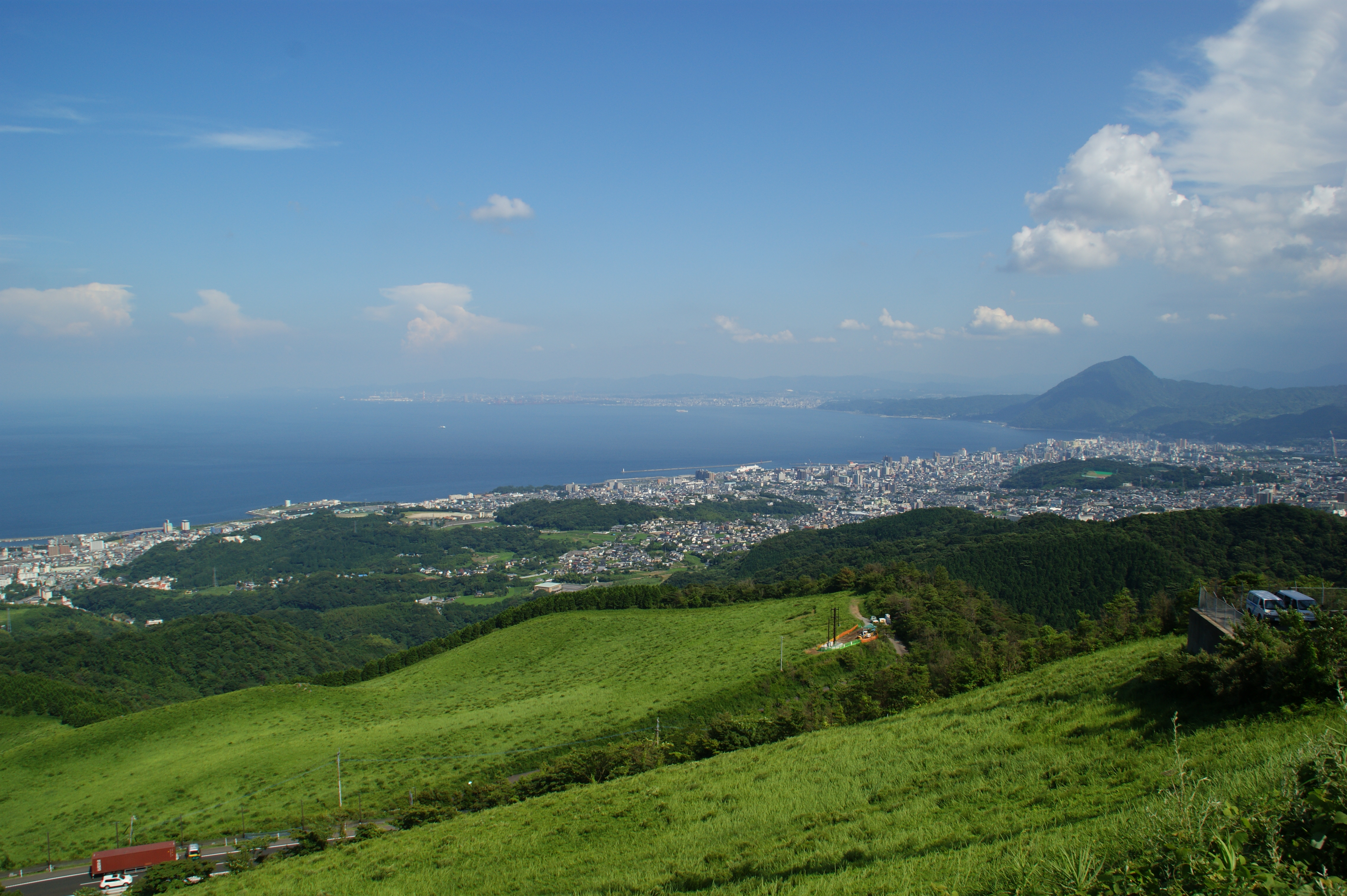
Beppu Bay, seen from Jumonjibaru in Beppu on 30 July 2008.

Beppu Bay (別府湾, Beppu-wan) is an arm of the western end of the Seto Inland Sea of Japan.

Beppu Bay is located on the northeast coast of Kyushu in Ōita Prefecture. The city of Ōita lies on its southern coast and the city of Beppu at its western end.

== Geology ==
Beppu Bay is a tectonic basin whose southeastern coast is the southern end of the Japan Median Tectonic Line, and lies between the Kyushu Central Fault Zone and its Southern Fault Zone. It is under the influence of the Philippine Sea plate convergence and is part of the 5 million year old tension graben of the Hohi Volcanic Zone of central Kyushu. The major deep structures are a half-graben under a strong North–South extensional regime and a younger pull–apart sag that evolved in a right-stepping part of the Median Tectonic Line.

Its anoxic bottom sediments have proved to be an excellent paleoenvironmental archive of the late Holocene climate, fish populations and diverse recent human-associated events.
