= Takase River (Aomori) =

River in Aomori Prefecture, Japan

Takase River 高瀬川
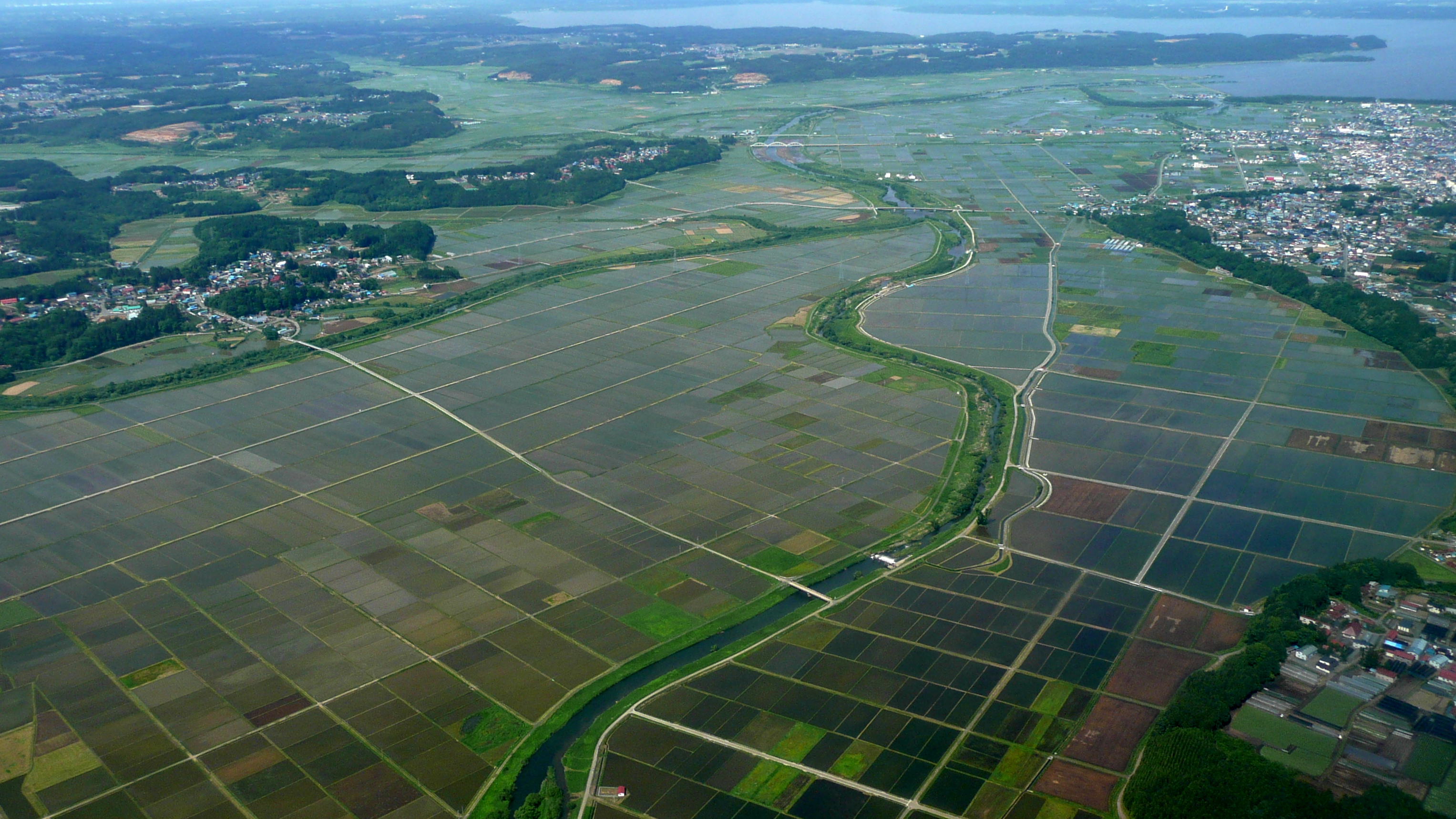
- A view of paddy fields and Takase River in the border between Tohoku and Shichinohe

- Location within Japan
- Native name: Takasegawa (Japanese)

Location
- Country: Japan
- Prefecture: Aomori

Physical characteristics
- Mouth: Pacific Ocean
  - coordinates: 40°53′10″N 141°23′34″E
- Length: 64 km (40 mi)
- Basin size: 867 km^{2} (335 sq mi)

The Takase River (高瀬川, Takasegawa) is a Class A river system that flows through Aomori Prefecture, Japan. It flows from Mt. Yahata, through Lake Ogawara into the Pacific Ocean.

The river is very important to the economy of the region. Approximately 80,000 people live in the river's catchment area.

Every July, the annual Lake Festival (湖水まつり, Kosui-matsuri) is held along the banks of the Takase River. The Takase River Office uses the opportunity to exhibit the "creatures that live in Lake Ogawara", which is popular with families. They also raise awareness about flood control, and water quality improvement of the lake.

In Japanese, takase means "shallow river".

== Geography ==
The river has a length of 64 kilometres (40 mi) and a catchment area of 867 square kilometres (335 sq mi). The basin area contains 2 cities, 4 towns, and 1 village.

Upstream from Lake Ogawara, the slope of the river ranges between 1:50 and 1:2000. Between the river and the Pacific Ocean, the slope is 1:30000 (almost horizontal). The water flows backwards from the sea into Lake Ogawara, causing it to be slightly brackish.

== Environment ==
Many species live in the Takase River system, such as river lamprey, killifish, and Japanese smelt. Lake Ogawara, located downstream, contains many brackish and freshwater aquatic plants like Braun's stonewort, and Ruppia maritima. Freshwater clams can also be found in the area.

Lake Ogawara is designated as one of Japan's 500 Important Wetlands by the Ministry of the Environment.

== Flooding ==
Since the Shōwa era, eight major floods have been observed. The most recent was in 2007.

Year	Cause of flood	Affected communities	Damage
1958	Typhoon Ida	Towada, Misawa, Shichinohe, Kamikitachō	3 dead or missing, 17 injured, 151 buildings destroyed, 2,801 buildings flooded
1965	1965 Pacific typhoon season	Towada, Misawa, Kamikitachō, Tōhoku	85 buildings partially damaged, 57 buildings flooded
1968	Cyclone	Tōhoku	106 buildings partially damaged, 93 buildings flooded
1990	Cyclone	Kamikitachō, Rokkasho	1 building partially damaged, 239 buildings flooded
1994	Weather front	Misawa, Kamikitachō	88 buildings flooded
1998	Cyclone	Kamikitachō, Tenmabayashi	12 buildings flooded
2006	Cyclone	Tōhoku	9 buildings flooded
2007	Cyclone	Tōhoku	3 buildings flooded
