= Shigenobu River =

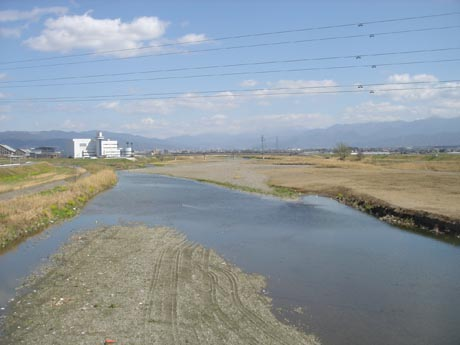
- Shigenobu River

- Location within Japan
- Native name: 重信川 (Japanese)

Location
- Country: Japan
- Prefecture: Ehime Prefecture

Physical characteristics
- Source
  - coordinates: 33.8722°N 132.971°E
- Mouth: Seto Inland Sea
  - coordinates: 33.806°N 132.6856°E}
  - elevation: 0 m
- Length: 36 km (22 mi)
- Basin size: 445 km^{2} (172 sq mi)

The Shigenobu River (重信川 Shigenobugawa) is a Japanese stream on the island of Shikoku. It flows through the Ehime Prefecture. It is classified as a class A river.

The Shigenobu river is 36 km (22 mi) long and the catchment area is 445 km^{2} (172 sq mi); the population of the catchment is about 244,000.

It rises on the slope of Mt. Higashisanpogamori (東三方ヶ森) in the town of Tōon. It flows to the south, then in Yoshihisa area turns west and crosses Matsuyama plain. On the plain it is joined by the rivers Haishi (拝志川), Tobe (砥部川), Uchikawa (内川) and Ishite (石手川), and ends in the city of Matsuyama.
