= Hime River =

Hime River 姫川
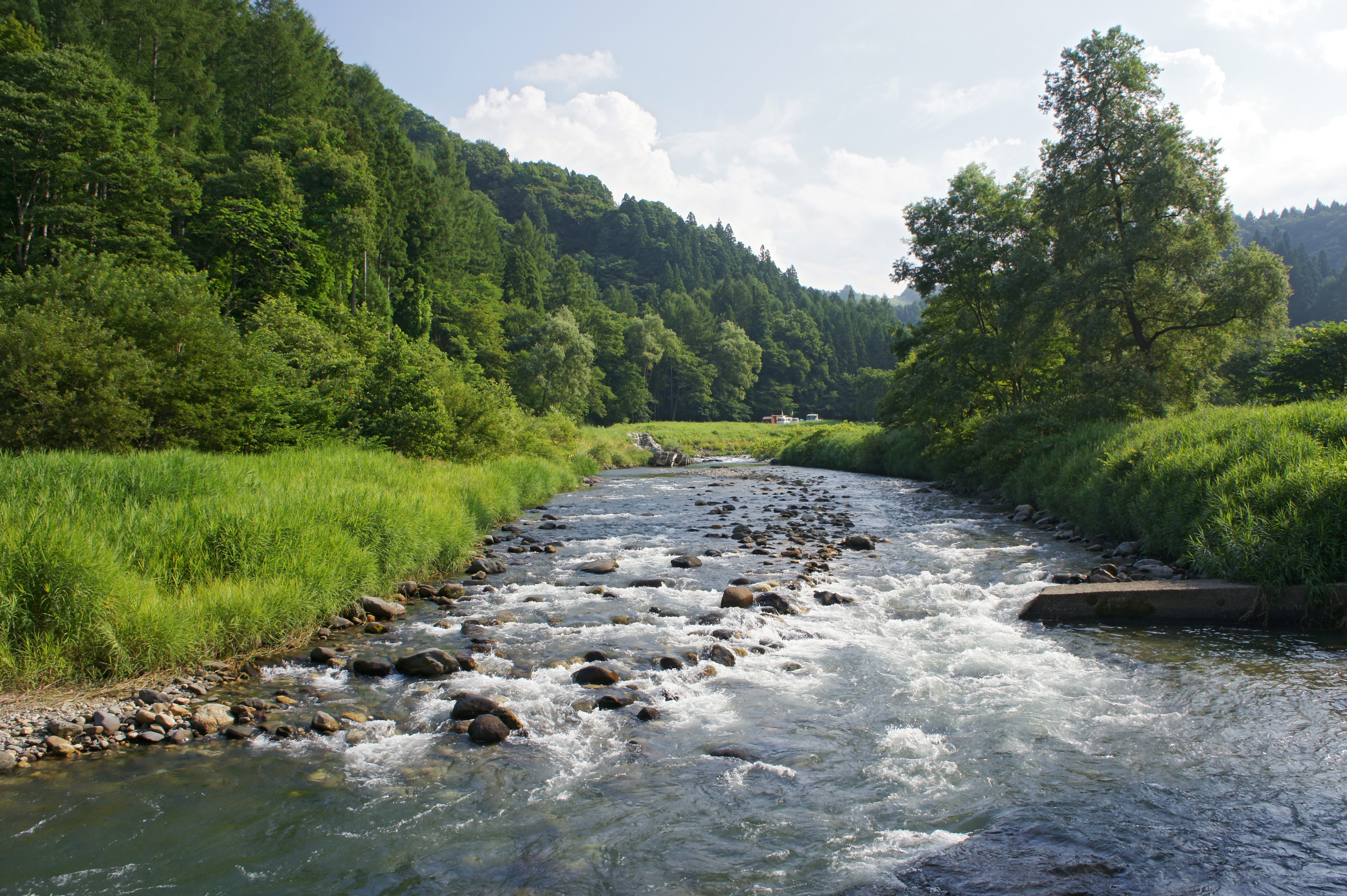
- Hime River in Hakuba Village in 2010

- Location within Japan

Location
- Country: Japan
- State: Honshu
- Region: Niigata, Nagano

Physical characteristics
- Source: Mount Shirouma
  - elevation: 2,932 m (9,619 ft)
- Mouth: Sea of Japan
  - coordinates: 37°02′27″N 137°49′55″E
- Length: 60 km (37 mi)
- Basin size: 722 km^{2} (279 sq mi)

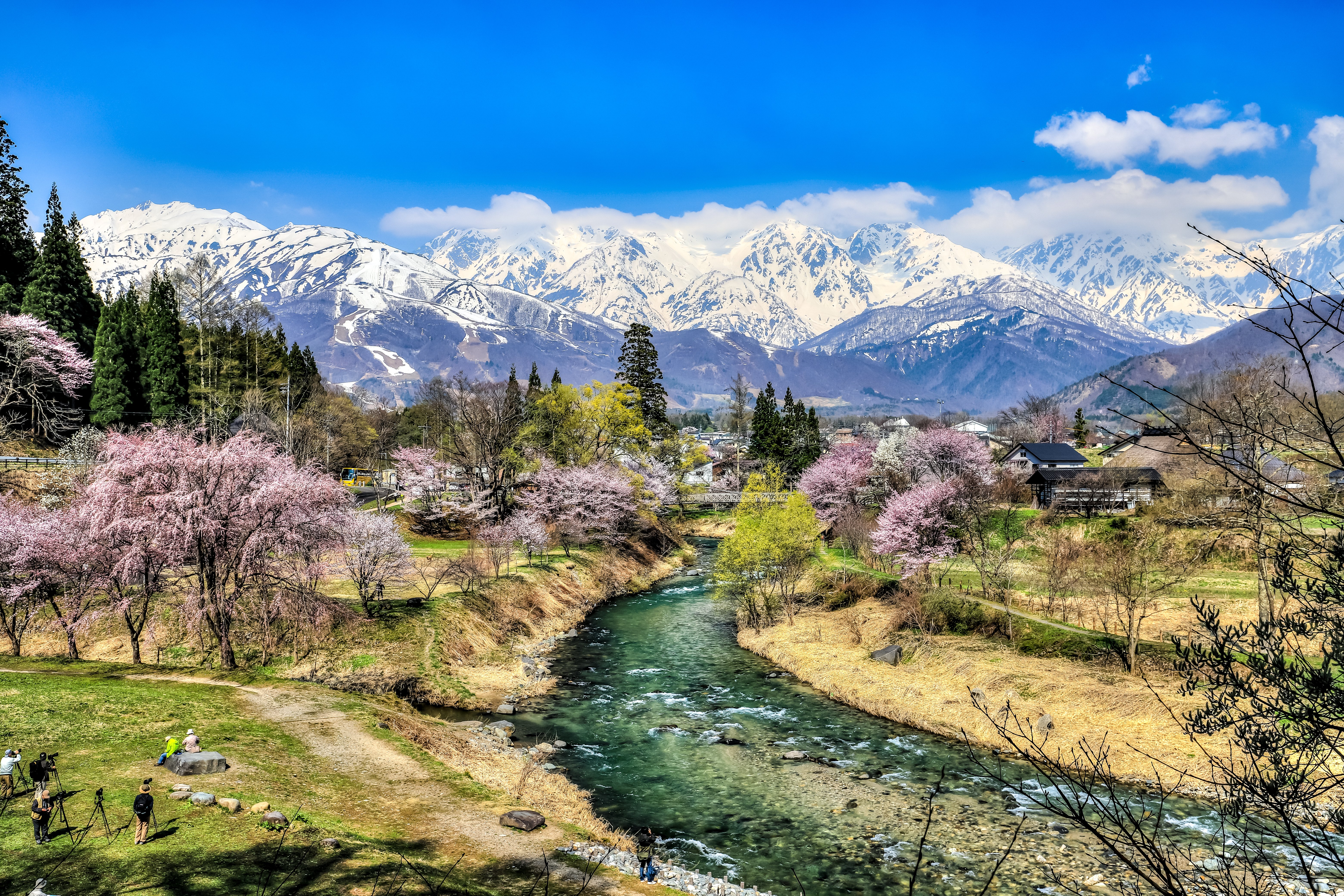
Oide Park and Hime River in Hakuba Village

The Hime River (姫川) is a Class A river in Niigata Prefecture and Nagano Prefecture, Japan.
