= Midori River =

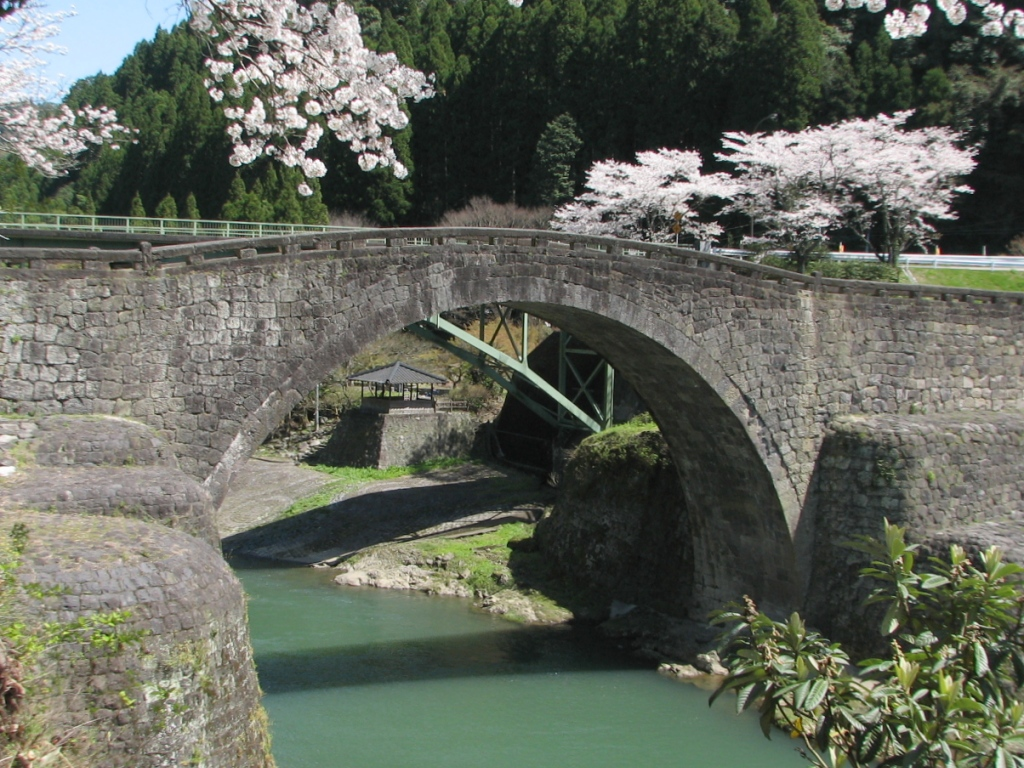
- Reitai Bridge over Midori in Misato Town

- Location within Japan
- Native name: 緑川 (Japanese)

Location
- Country: Japan
- Prefecture: Kumamoto Prefecture

Physical characteristics
- Source
  - coordinates: 32.5943°N 131.0643°E
- Mouth: Ariake Sea
  - coordinates: 32.7164°N 130.6031°E}
  - elevation: 0 m
- Length: 76 km (47 mi)
- Basin size: 1,100 km^{2} (420 sq mi)

The Midori River (緑川, Midorikawa) is a river on the island of Kyushu, flowing through the Kumamoto Prefecture.

The river rises on the slopes of Mount Mikata (1,578 m; 5,177 ft), located in the Yamato town. It joins the Mifune River, then flows through the Kumamoto plain. After the confluence with the rivers Kasegawa and Hamadogawa it discharges into Ariake Sea, a part of the East China Sea.

The Rokkaku River is 76 km (47 mi) long, and the catchment area is 1,100 km^{2} (420 sq mi); the population of the catchment is about 540,000. It is designated as a Class A river by the Ministry of Land, Infrastructure, Transport and Tourism (MLIT).
