= Arakawa River (Uetsu) =

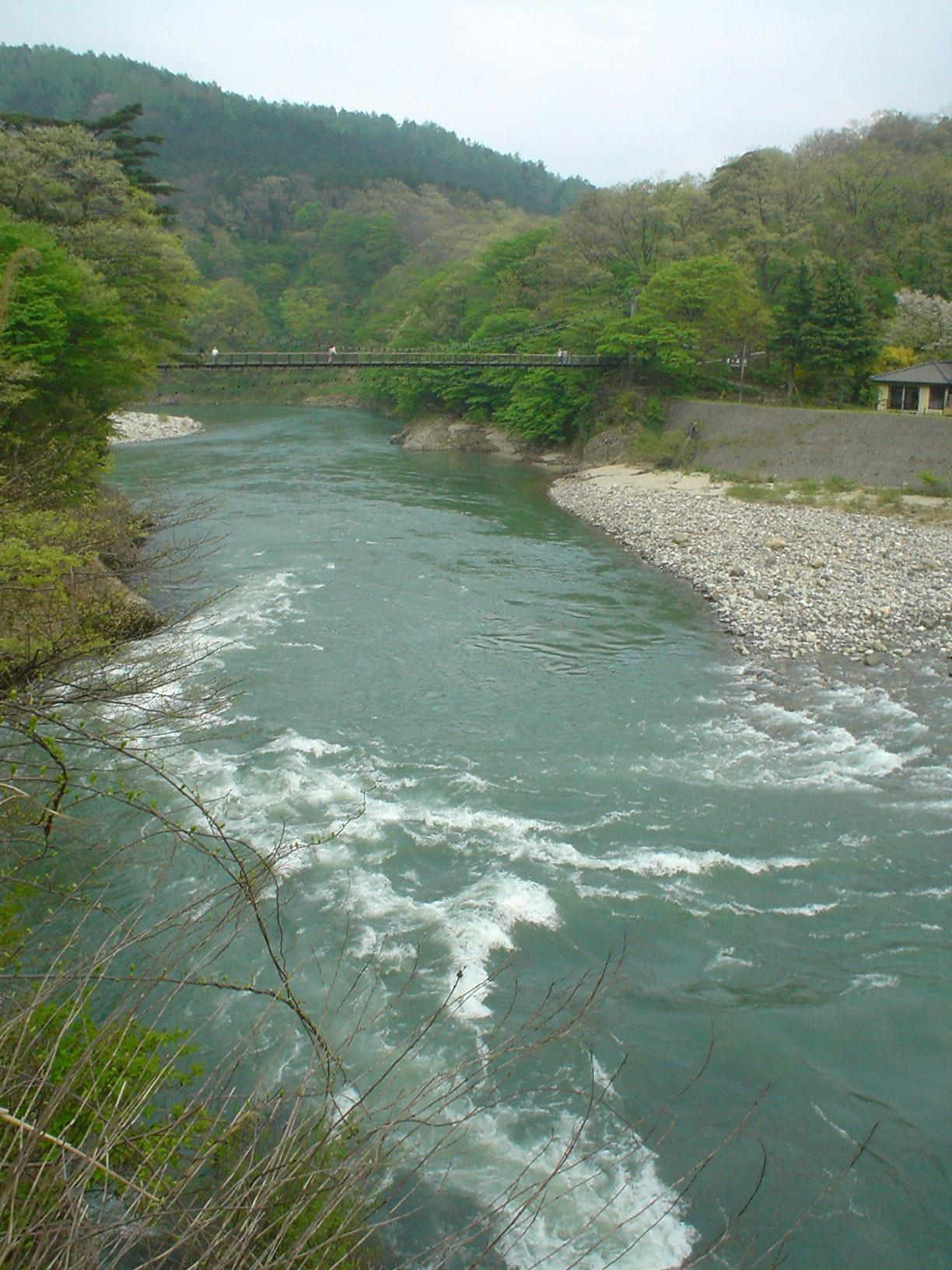
- Arakawa River

- Location of mouth in Japan

Location
- Country: Japan
- Prefectures: Yamagata, Niigata

Physical characteristics
- Mouth
  - location: Sea of Japan
  - coordinates: 38°09′00″N 139°24′32″E
- Length: 73 km (45 mi)

The Arakawa River is a river that flows through Yamagata and Niigata prefectures in northern Japan. Its source is O-Asahidake, within the Bandai-Asahi National Park in Oguni Town, Yamagata. it flows in an approximately southwesterly direction for 73 kilometres (45 mi) before discharging into the Sea of Japan at Momozakihama in the city of Tainai, Niigata. Its tributaries include the Yokogawa and Onagawa in Yamagata and Sekigawa in Niigata. It covers a total of 1,150 km^{2} (440 sq mi) and has been classified as a "first-class river" by the Japanese Ministry of Land, Infrastructure, Transport and Tourism as being important to commerce.
