= Oyabe River =

River in Toyama Prefecture, Japan

Oyabe River 小矢部川
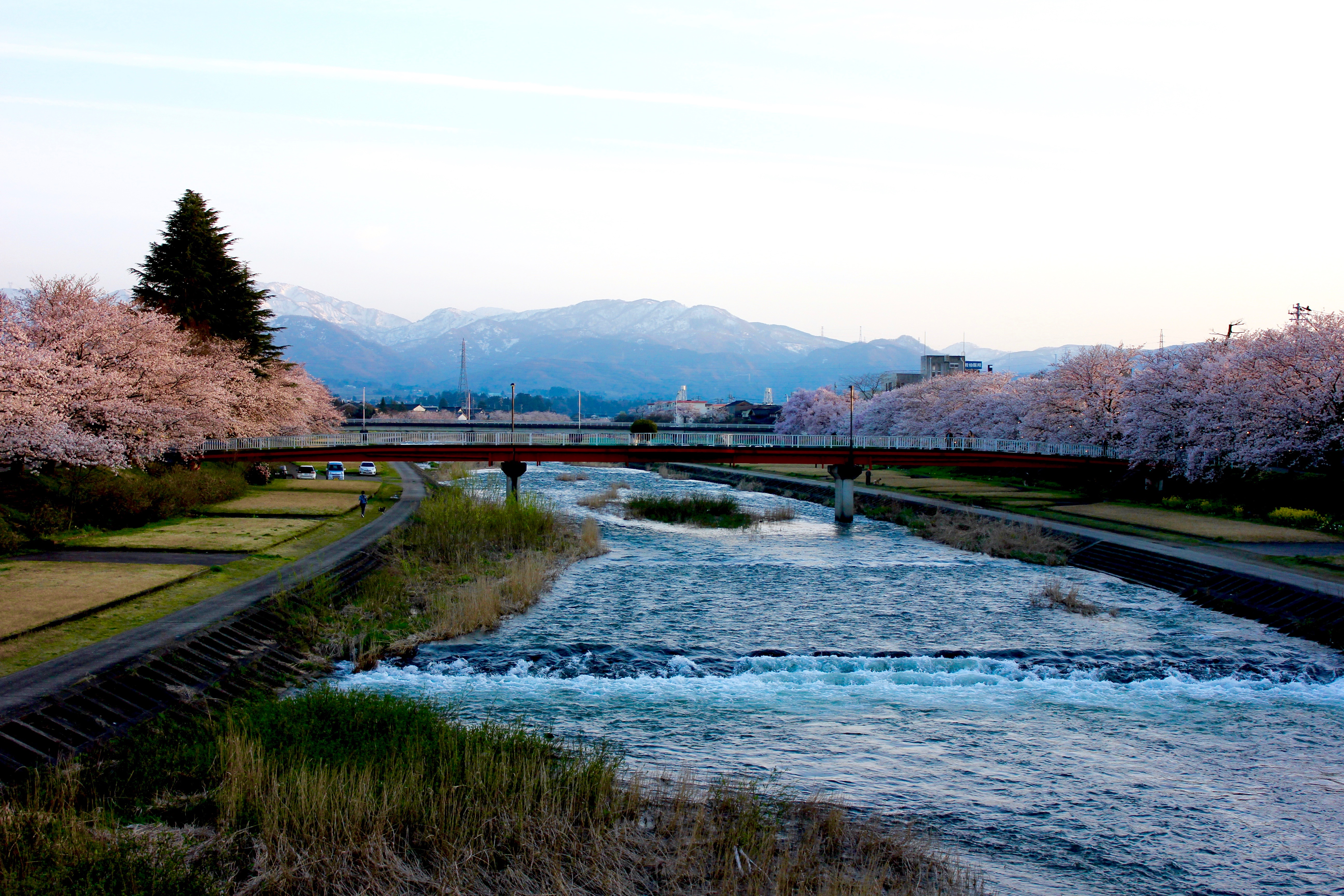

- Location within Japan
- Etymology: Japonic
- Native name: Oyabe-gawa (Japanese)

Location
- Country: Japan
- State: Toyama
- Region: Chūbu
- Municipalities: Nanto, Oyabe, Takaoka, Imizu

Physical characteristics
- Source: Mount Daimon
  - location: Nanto, Toyama, Japan
  - elevation: 1,572 m (5,157 ft)
- Mouth: Sea of Japan
  - location: Takaoka & Imizu, Toyama, Japan
  - coordinates: 36.794°N 137.067°E
  - elevation: 0 m (0 ft)
- Length: 68 km (42 mi)
- Basin size: 682 km^{2} (263 sq mi)
- Discharge
  - average: 24.31 m^{3}/s (858 cu ft/s)

The Oyabe River (小矢部川, Oyabe-gawa) is a Class A river in Toyama Prefecture, Japan. The river rises from Mount Daimon on the border of Ishikawa Prefecture and enters the sea at Toyama Bay.

The river runs through the city of Fukumitsu in Toyama, where two kilometres (1.2 mi) are lined with trees for cherry blossom-viewing.

== Geography ==
=== Tributary ===
- Konade River
- Yamada River
