= Tenjin River =

Tenjin River 天神川
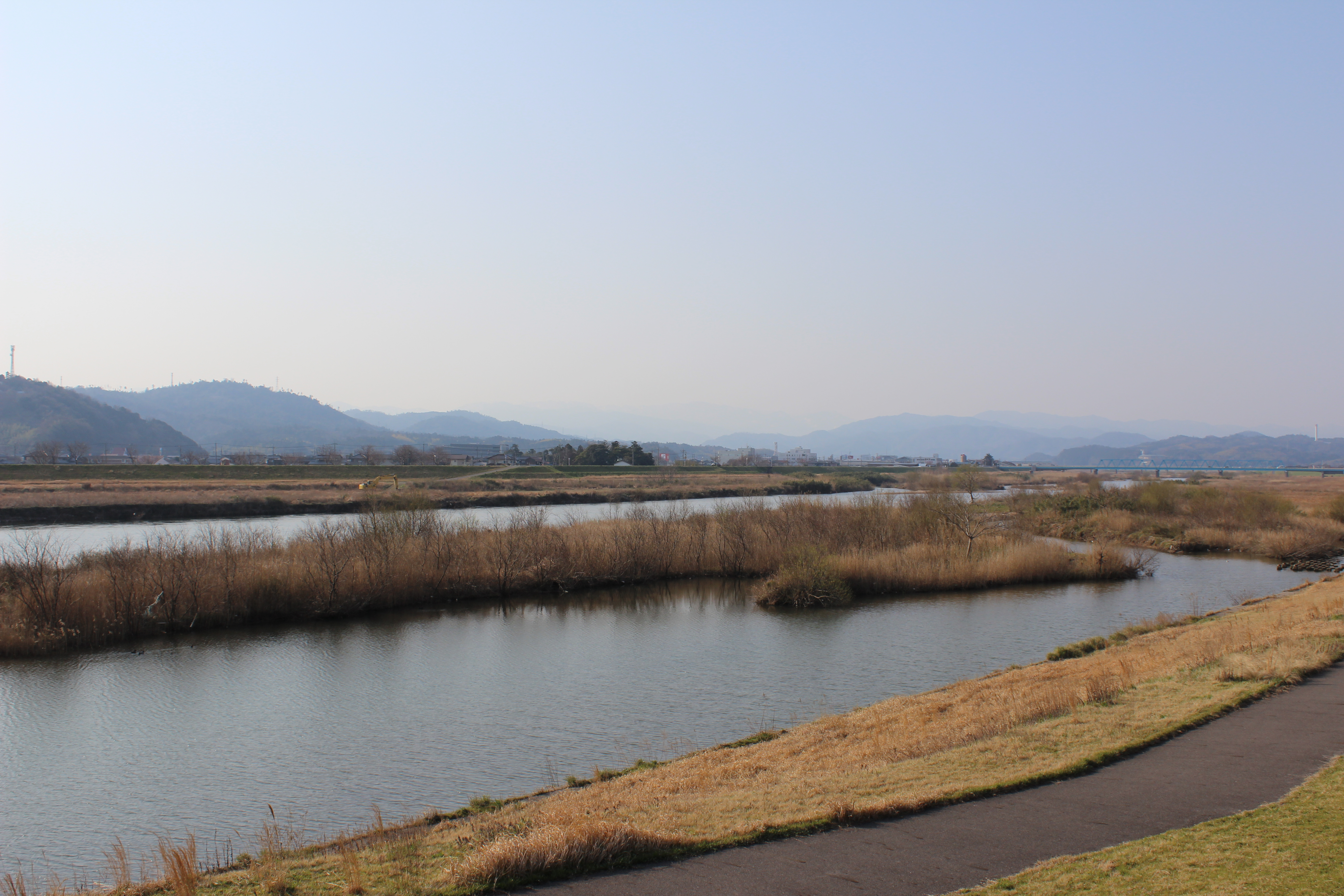
- Tenjin River in 2014

- Location within Japan

Location
- Country: Japan
- State: Honshu
- Region: Tottori

Physical characteristics
- Source: Tsuguro (津黒山)
  - elevation: 1,118 m (3,668 ft)
- Mouth: Sea of Japan
  - coordinates: 35°30′16″N 133°51′26″E
- Length: 32 km (20 mi)
- Basin size: 490 km^{2} (190 sq mi)

The Tenjin River (天神川) is a Class A river in Tottori Prefecture, Japan. There are approximately 120 sakura trees along the river. Visitors can take part in hanami (flower-viewing party) which is held each year.
