= Takatsu River =

Takatsu River 高津川
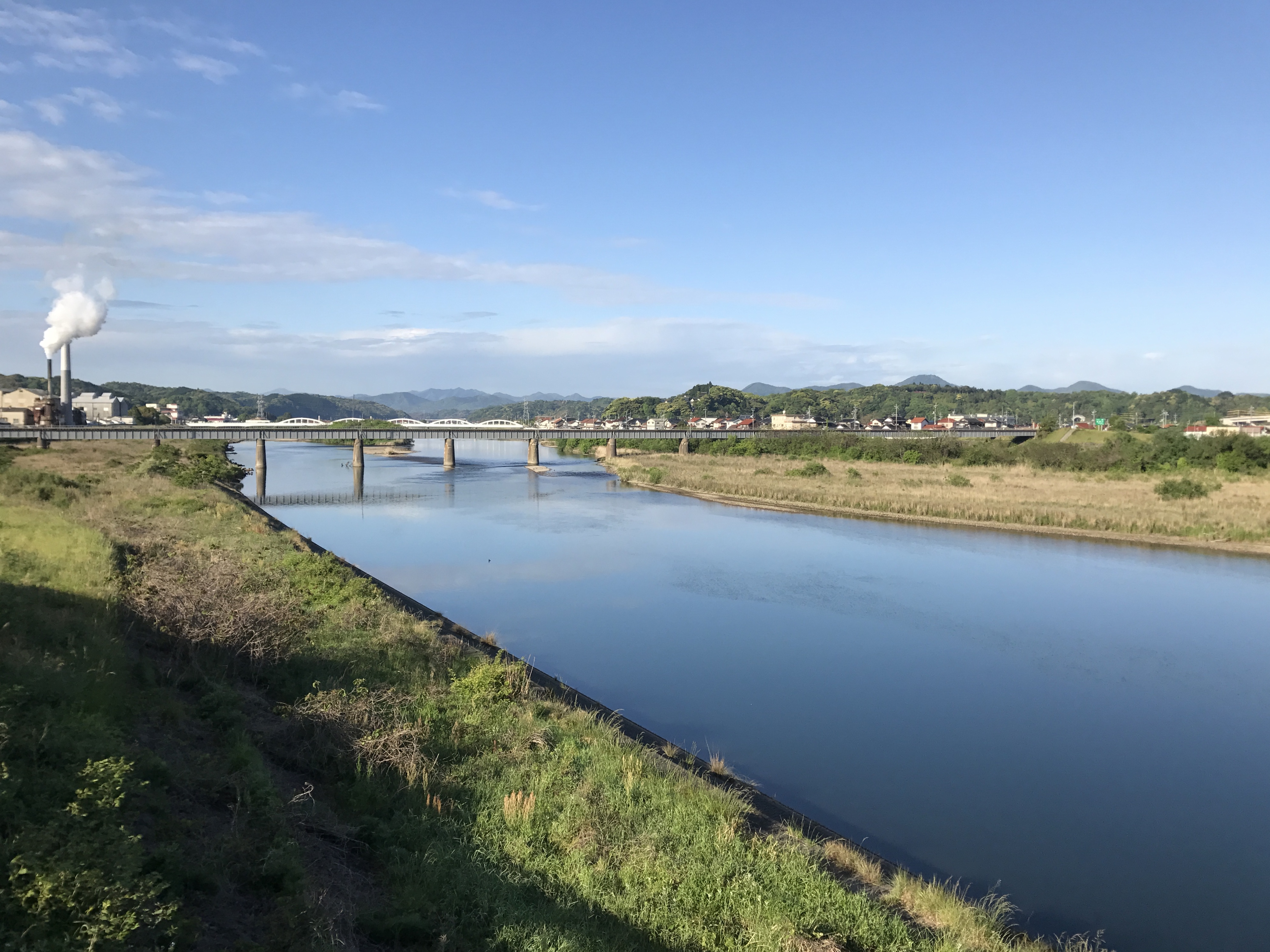
- Takatsu River in 2017

- Location within Japan

Location
- Country: Japan
- State: Honshu
- Region: Shimane

Physical characteristics
- Mouth: Sea of Japan
  - coordinates: 34°41′48″N 131°49′14″E
- Length: 81 km (50 mi)
- Basin size: 1,090 km^{2} (420 sq mi)

The Takatsu River is a Class A river in Shimane Prefecture, Japan.
