= Aka River =

Aka River Akagawa
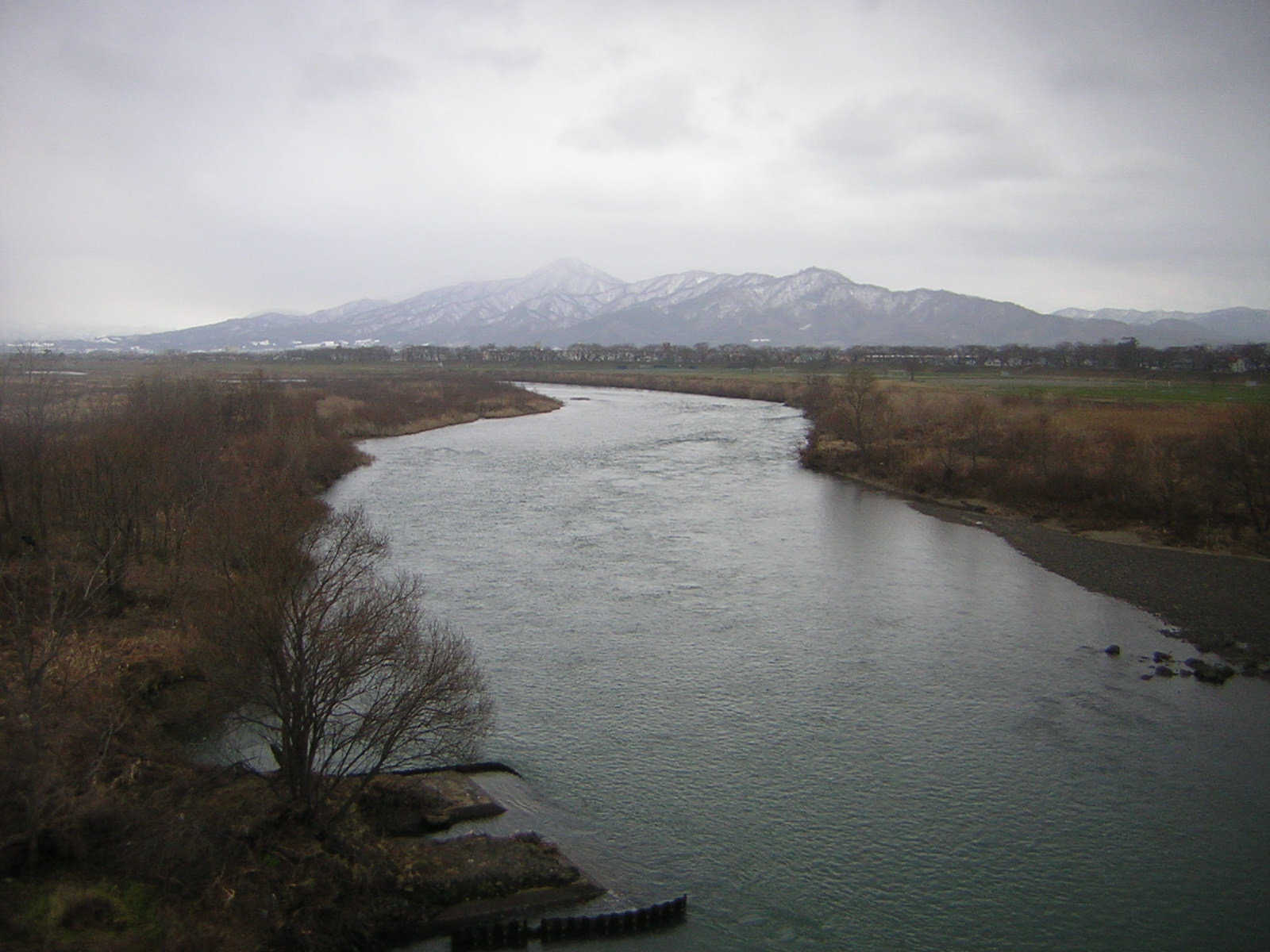
- Aka River flowing through the city of Tsuruoka

- Location within Japan
- Etymology: Red River
- Native name: 赤川 (Japanese)

Location
- Country: Japan
- State: Honshu
- Region: Yamagata

Physical characteristics
- Source: Mount Itoh
  - elevation: 1,771 m (5,810 ft)
- Mouth: Sea of Japan
  - coordinates: 38°50′50″N 139°47′03″E
- Length: 70 km (43 mi)
- Basin size: 857 km^{2} (331 sq mi)

Aka River (赤川, Akagawa; lit. 'red river') is a Class A river in Yamagata Prefecture, Japan. It flows into the Sea of Japan.

== Soccer fields on Akagawa riverbed ==
There are football fields on Akagawa riverbed in Tsuruoka, and they were NEC Yamagata SC's practice grounds.
