= Naka River (Tokushima) =

River in Shikoku, Japan

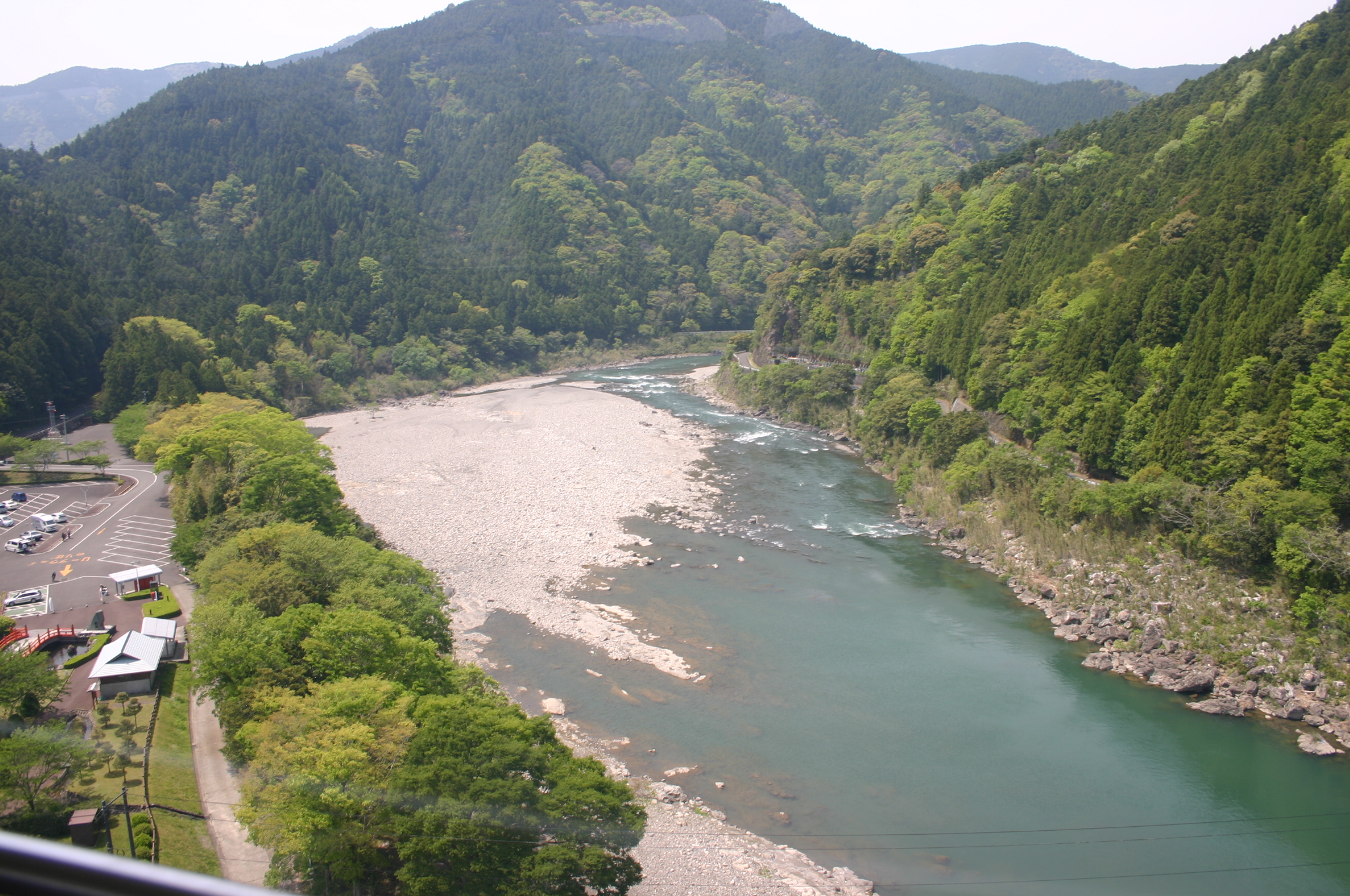

- Location within Japan
- Native name: 那賀川 (Japanese)

Location
- Country: Japan
- Prefectures: Tokushima

Physical characteristics
- Source
  - location: Mount Tsurugi
  - coordinates: 33°50′08″N 134°04′28″E
- Mouth
  - location: Pacific Ocean
  - coordinates: 33°56′37″N 134°41′55″E
  - elevation: 0 m (0 ft)
- Length: 125 km (78 mi)
- Basin size: 874 km^{2} (337 sq mi)

Basin features
- Population: 47000

The Naka River (那賀川, Naka-gawa) is a Class A river system on the island of Shikoku, Japan.

The Naka River flows for 125 kilometers (78 mi). It has a watershed area of 874 square kilometers (337 sq mi), with a population of about 47,000 people.
