= Kakehashi River =

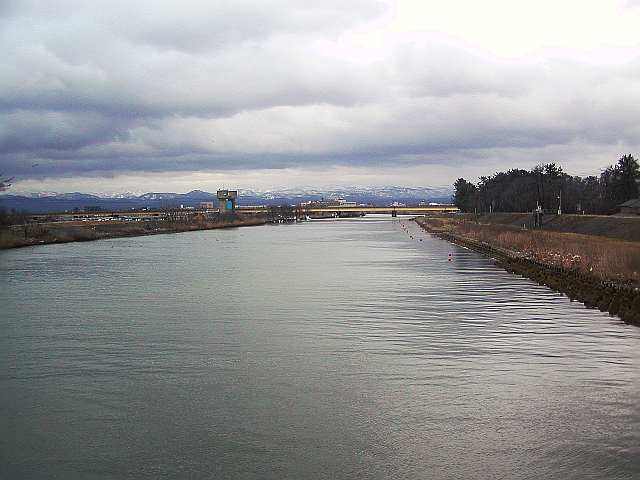

- Native name: 梯川 (Japanese)

Location
- Country: Japan

Physical characteristics
- Source
  - location: Suzugaoka
  - elevation: 1,174 m (3,852 ft)
- Mouth
  - location: Sea of Japan
- Length: 42 km (26 mi)
- Basin size: 271 km^{2} (105 sq mi)

The Kakehashi River (梯川, Kakehashi-gawa) has its source at Suzugaoka (鈴ヶ丘) in the city of Komatsu, Ishikawa Prefecture, Japan.

== Geography ==
The Class A river flows from Suzugaoka, which is part of the same mountain chain as Mount Haku. It forms the southern border of Komatsu, separating it from Kaga.
