= Yoneshiro River =

Coordinates: 40°13′18″N 140°00′13″E

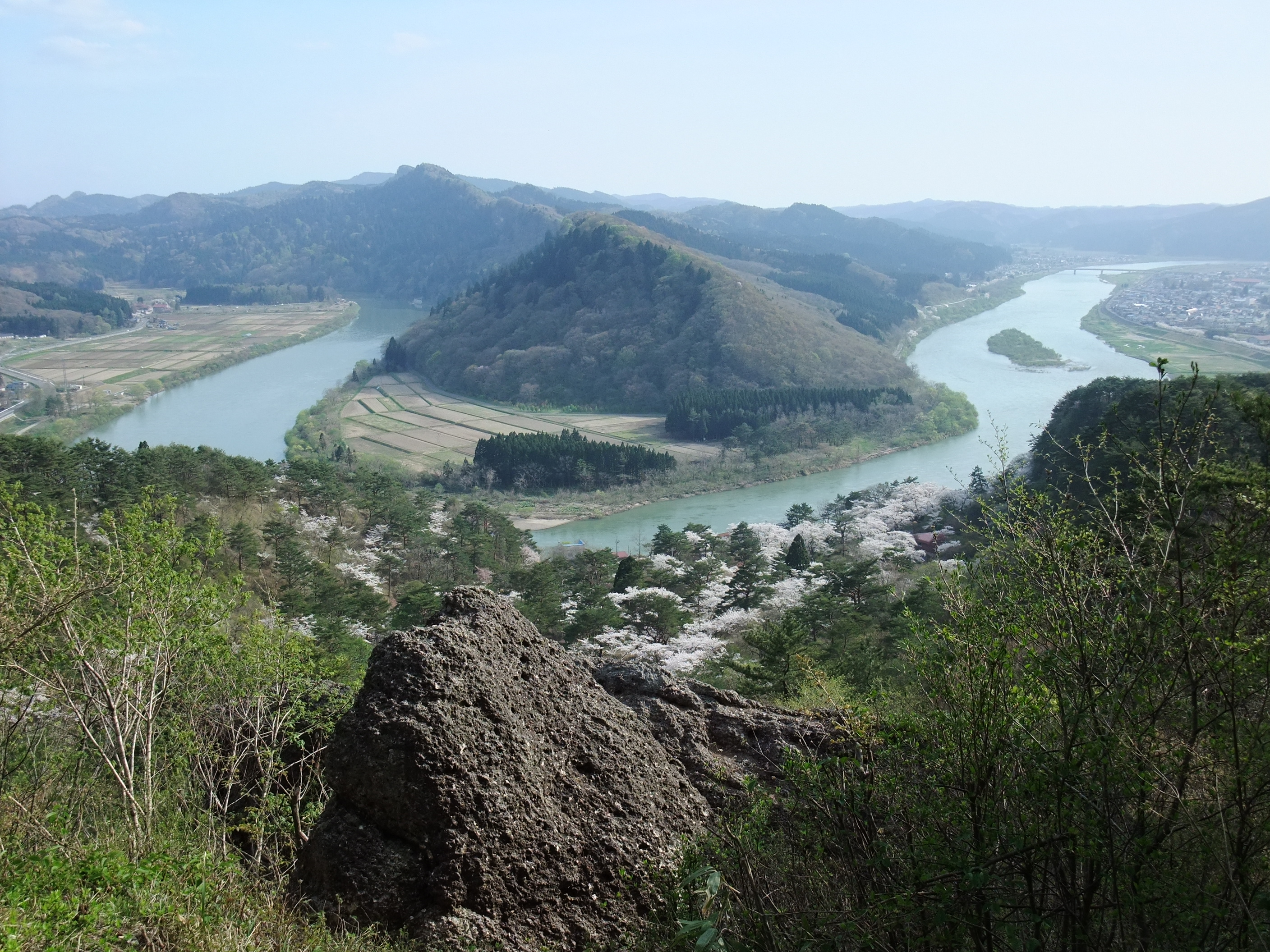
- View of the Yoneshiro River From Mt. Nanakura, in Noshiro, Akita

- Native name: 米代川 (Japanese)

Location
- Country: Japan

Physical characteristics
- Source
  - location: Ōu Mountains, Akita and Iwate Prefectures
  - elevation: 1,024 m (3,360 ft)
- Mouth
  - location: Sea of Japan
  - elevation: 0 m (0 ft)
- Length: 136 km (85 mi)
- Basin size: 4,100 km^{2} (1,600 sq mi)
- Discharge
  - average: 254 m^{3}/s (9,000 cu ft/s)

The Yoneshiro River (米代川, Yoneshirogawa) is a Class A river in the Tōhoku region of northern Honshū in Japan. It is 136 kilometres (85 mi) long and has a watershed of 4,100 square kilometres (1,600 sq mi). The section near the mouth of the river, flowing through Noshiro city, it is also known as the Noshiro River.

The river rises from Mount Nakadake and Mount Shikakudake in the Ōu Mountains and Mount Hachimantai near the border of Akita Prefecture with Iwate and Aomori Prefectures, and flows west through the Hanawa and Odate basins in northern Akita Prefecture and into the Sea of Japan at Noshiro, Akita.
