= Omono River =

River in Akita prefecture, Japan

Coordinates: 39°41′28″N 140°03′37″E

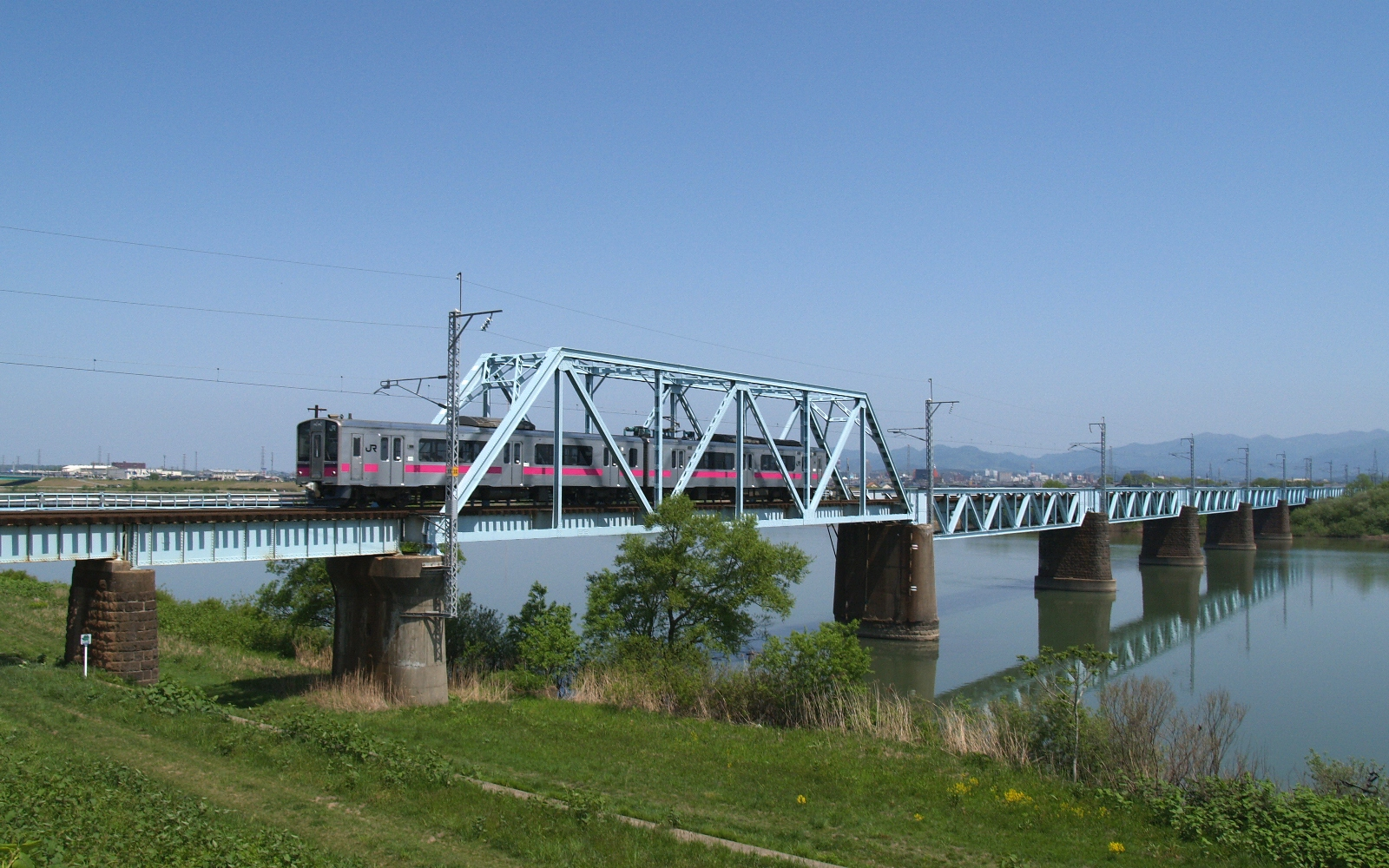
- Omonogawa Bridge

- Location within Japan
- Native name: 雄物川 (Japanese)

Location
- Country: Japan

Physical characteristics
- Source
  - location: Mount Daisen
  - elevation: 920 m (3,020 ft)
- Mouth
  - location: Sea of Japan
  - elevation: 0 m (0 ft)
- Length: 133 km (83 mi)
- Basin size: 4,710 km^{2} (1,820 sq mi)
- Discharge
  - average: 276.2 m^{3}/s (9,750 cu ft/s)

Basin features
- River system: Omono River

The Omono River (雄物川, Omono-gawa) is located in Akita Prefecture, Japan. The river flows from Mount Daisen on the border of Akita Prefecture with Miyagi and Yamagata Prefectures in the city of Yuzawa and drains into the Sea of Japan at the city of Akita. The river's drainage basin is essentially the entire southern half of Akita Prefecture. The river is free of dams for its entire length. It is regarded as a "first class river" in the Japanese river classification system.
