= List of dams in Kagawa Prefecture =

The following is a list of dams in Kagawa Prefecture, Japan.

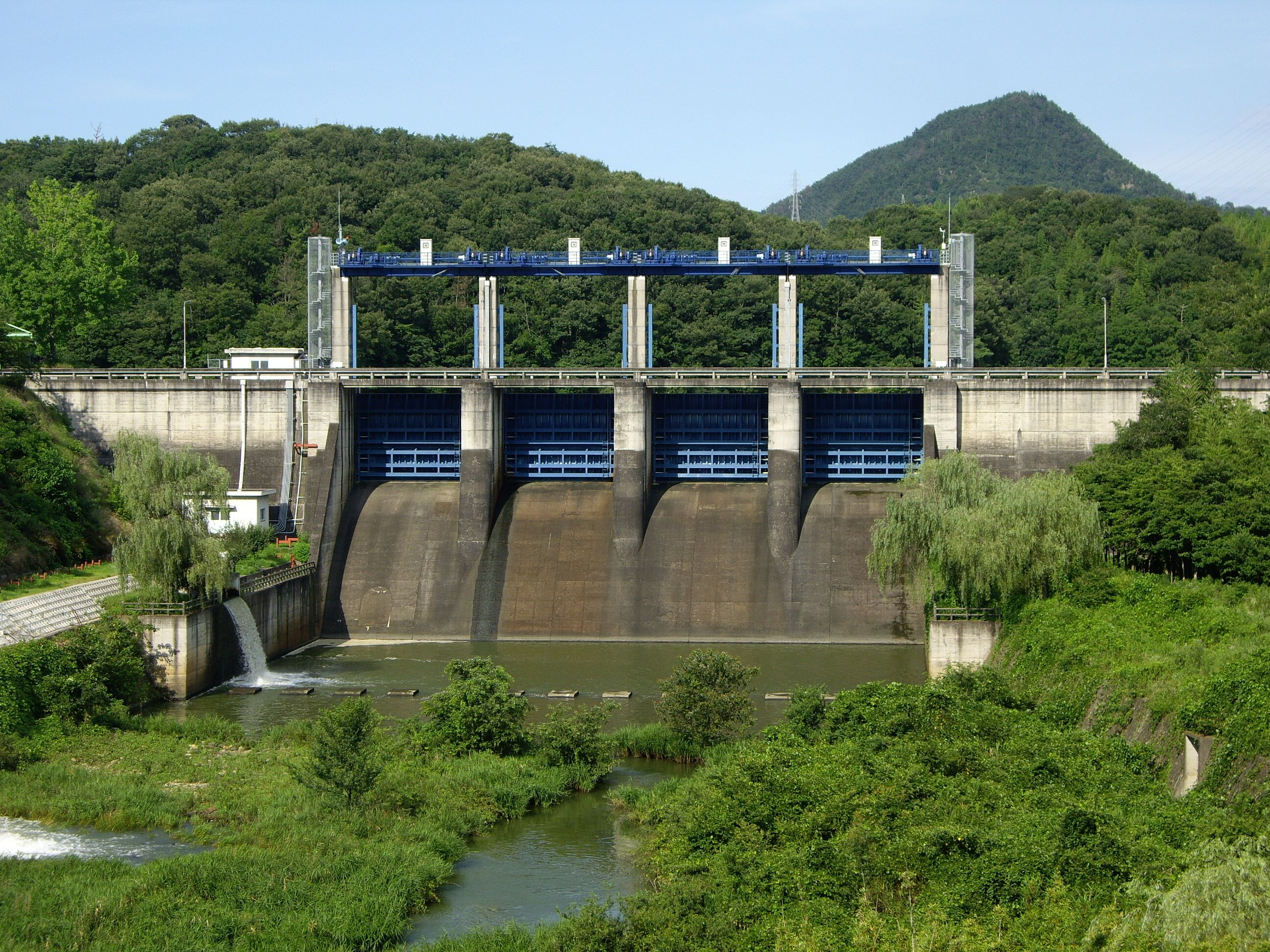
Fuchu Dam, taken in 2010

== List ==
Name	Location	Opened	Completed	Height (metres)	Length (metres)	DiJ no.
Awai Dam				42		3091
Awachi Dam		1972	1980	46	290	2185
Bicchuji-ike Dam		1952	1961	21.6	103	2173
Fuchu Dam		1966	1966	27.5		2180
Futamatauwa-ike Dam			2002	16	217	2142
Gogo Dam		1960	1964	50.5	132	2177
Gomyo Dam		1995		55.4	236	3257
Goten Dam		1937	1954	17	497	2167
Hananoyama-ike Dam			1979	21.5	75	2152
Heki Dam						
Hōnen'ike Dam		1926	1930	32		2156
Iseki-ike Dam			1982	16	350	2147
Ishigami-ike Dam			1963	21	200	2148
Iwase-ike Dam			1967	17.6	152	2141
Jinnai-ike Dam			1969	15.2	249	2182
Jinnai-kami-ike Dam			1916	29.7	130	2153
Jo-ike Dam			1975	16.5	190	3613
Kabagawa Dam		1994		88.5	265.5	3238
Kaerugo-ike Dam			1960	15.3	420	2172
Kagawa Yosui Choseichi Dam		1999	2008	25	240	3374
Kamekoshi-ike Dam			1993	19	106	2146
Kawamata Dam			1962	26	103	2174
Kinbuchi-ike Dam			1933	27.1	260	2158
Kochi-ike Dam			1909	17.8	187	2157
Kokage-ike Dam			1973	26.8	156	2162
Kototani-ike Dam		1985	1987	19.3	173	2945
Kuratani-ike Dam			1981	15	100	2155
Maeyama Dam				38.8		2184
Mannoike Dam			1959	32	155.8	3337
Matsuo-ike Dam			1971	18.7	423	3614
Mikuro-ike Dam			1975	16.8	96	2151
Mokkoku-ike Dam		1985	1991	27.1	298	2946
Monnyu Dam		1980	1998	47.3	202.5	2190
Nagara Dam		1995		42.6	190	3311
Naiba Dam			1952	50		2165
Nakayama-ike Dam			1979	17	144	2170
Ni-ike Dam			1967	16	328	2149
Noguchi Dam			1966	35	123	2178
Ohtani-ike Dam			1959	16.9	304	2139
Ouchi Dam		1963	1966	26	121.2	2179
Okawa Dam		1959	1963	36		2176
Sakase-ike Dam			1962	22.2		2168
Sangoro-ike Dam		1916	1924	18		3581
Senzoku Dam		1975	1987	41.4		2186
Shin-ike Dam		1968	1970	15.1		3627
Shinnakayama-ike Dam		1951	1961	26		3368
Shoji-ike Dam			1937	17.5		2181
Sogoku-ike Dam			1956	27.3		2154
Tajigawa Dam			1957	21.7		2164
Taman Dam		1978	1989	49		2187
Tawatari-ike Dam			1928	18.4		2143
Togawa Dam			1957	19.6		2169
Tonogawa Dam		1967	1974	35.6		2183
Uchinomi Dam		1997	2013	43		
Uno-ike Dam			1976	15.1		3615
Yamada Dam						
Yoshida Dam				74.5		2955
Yusuirin Dam		1938	1943	20.8		3579

== See also ==
- Media related to Dams in Kagawa prefecture at Wikimedia Commons
