= List of dams in Ehime Prefecture =

The following is a list of dams in Ehime Prefecture, Japan.

== List ==
Name	Location	Opened	Height (metres)	Image
Asakura Dam		1981	47	
Besshi Dam			71	
Bozo-ike Dam		1940	15.5	
Choshi Dam		1977	47.2	
Daimyojin-ike Dam		1962	25.8	
Fuchigatani-ike Dam		1952	16	
Fukigawa Dam		1985	33.7	
Furu-ike Dam		1870	18	
Ikata Dam		1989	29.1	
Ikenotani-ike Dam		1913	16	
Inuzuka-ike Dam		1938	18.5	
Ishidekawa Dam		1972	87	
Kamiura Dam		1978	31	
Kanogawa Dam		1958	61	
Kasen Dam		1973	41	
Koda-ike Dam		1953	22.3	
Kurose Dam		1972	61.7	
Nakayamagawa Gyaku Tyouseiti Dam		1963	20.8	
Nishiyama-ike Dam		1955	24.2	
Nomura Dam		1981	60	
Okuboyama Dam		1979	55.8	
Ohtani-ike Dam		1944	37	
Oji-ike Dam		1951	17.6	
Omogo Dam			73.5	
Omogo No.3 Dam		1984	42	
Ryutakuji-ike Dam		1955	27.3	
Sakase-ike Dam		1927	24.9	
Sako Dam		2001	31	
Sanzai Dam		1980	64	
Sekiji-ike Dam		1961	22.5	
Shikamori Dam		1962	57.9	
Shikogawa Dam		2010	48.2	
Shingu Dam			42	
Shin-ike Dam		1877	20.1	
Shironotani-ike Dam		1953	27.4	
Sukagawa Dam		1975	40.2	
Takoutaue-ike Dam		1908	17.3	
Tamagawa Dam			56	
Tateiwa Dam		1980	48.2	
Tawarabara-ike Dam		1942	25.5	
Tomisato Dam			106	
Tokenji Dam		1996	38.1	
Tsuboimo-ike Dam		1942	15	
Utena Dam		1991	42.3	
Yamanokami-ike Dam		1963	17.5	
Yamatosaka Dam		2026	103	
Yanadani Dam		1989	28.5	
Yanase Dam			55.5	
Yashiro Dam		1975	24.2	
Yokotani Choseichii Dam		1967	31	
Yoshifuji-ike Dam		1956	24.2	

== See also ==
- Media related to Dams in Ehime prefecture at Wikimedia Commons
