= Shin-ike Dam =

Shin-ike Dam may refer to:

- Shin-ike Dam (Aichi)
- Shin-ike Dam (Ehime)
- Shin-ike Dam (Kagawa)
