= Ohtani-ike Dam =

Ohtani-ike Dam may refer to:

- Ohtani-ike Dam (Ehime, Japan)
- Ohtani-ike Dam (Gifu, Japan)
- Ohtani-ike Dam (Hiroshima)
- Ohtani-ike Dam, Hyogo (Japan)
- Ohtani-ike Dam (Kagawa, Japan)

== See also ==
- Ohtani Dam (Shimane)
- Ohtani Dam (Kumamoto)
