= Hijikawa =

Hijikawa (Japanese: 肱川) may refer to:

- 97582 Hijikawa, a minor planet
- Hijikawa, Ehime, a dissolved municipality in Ehime prefecture, Japan
- Hijikawa Prefectural Natural Park, a Prefectural Natural Park in Ehime Prefecture, Japan
- Hiji River, a river in Ehime Prefecture
