= Maeyama =

Maeyama may refer to:

- Maeyama Station, a railway station in Akita Prefecture, Japan
- Maeyama Dam, a dam in Kagawa Prefecture, Japan

== People with the surname ==
- Kyohei Maeyama (前山 恭平, born 1987), Japanese footballer
- Takahisa Maeyama (前山 剛久, born 1991), Japanese actor
