= Hijikawa Prefectural Natural Park =

Park in Japan

Coordinates: 33°26′N 132°41′E

- 肱川県立自然公園
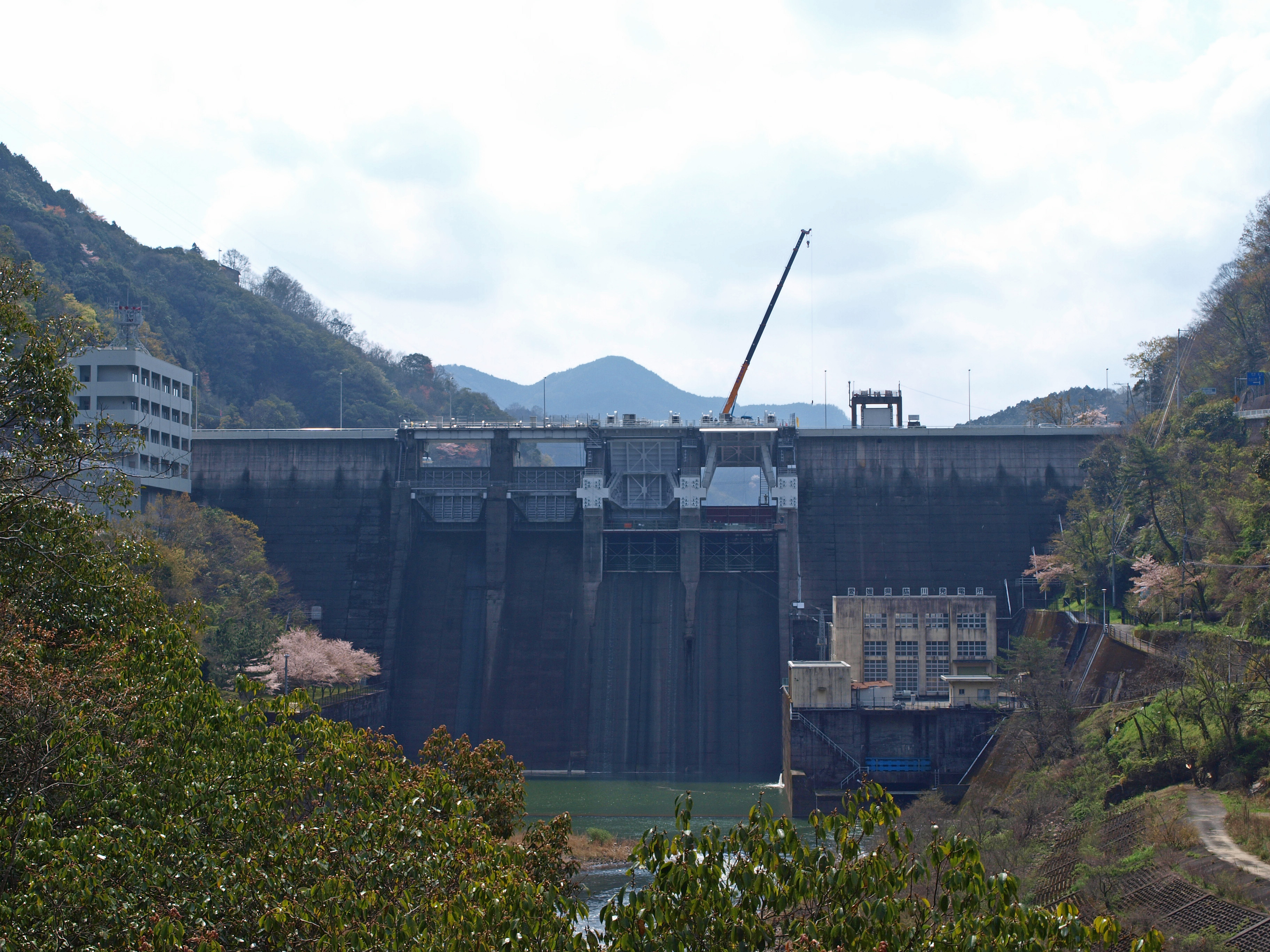
- Kanogawa Dam
- Interactive map of Hijikawa Prefectural Natural Park
- Location: Ehime Prefecture, Japan
- Nearest city: Ōzu, Seiyo
- Area: 6.6 square kilometres (2.5 sq mi)
- Established: 10 May 1960

Hijikawa Prefectural Natural Park (肱川県立自然公園, Hijikawa kenritsu shizen-kōen) is a Prefectural Natural Park in Ehime Prefecture, Japan. Established in 1960, the park spans the borders of the municipalities of Ōzu and Seiyo. The park's central feature is the eponymous Hiji River.

It is located in the area around the Kanogawa Dam upstream of the Hijikawa River, Ehime Prefecture's largest river.

== See also ==
- National Parks of Japan
