= Sakase-ike Dam =

Sakase-ike Dam may refer to:

- Sakase-ike Dam (Ehime)
- Sakase-ike Dam (Kagawa)
