= Yusuirin Dam =

Dam in Kagawa Prefecture, Japan

- Location within Japan
- Official name: 遊水林ダム
- Location: Kagawa Prefecture, Japan
- Coordinates: 34°9′44″N 134°1′53″E
- Construction began: 1938
- Opening date: 1943

Dam and spillways
- Height: 20.8 m (68 ft)
- Length: 44.5 m (146 ft)

Reservoir
- Total capacity: 113.7000 m^{3} (4,015.28 cu ft)
- Catchment area: 2.5 km^{2} (0.97 sq mi)
- Surface area: 1.3 hectares (3.2 acres)

Yusuirin Dam (Japanese: 遊水林ダム) is a gravity dam located in Kagawa Prefecture in Japan. The dam is used for flood control and irrigation. The catchment area of the dam is 2.5 km^{2}. The dam impounds about 1.3 ha of land when full and can store 113.7 thousand cubic meters of water. The construction of the dam was started on 1938 and completed in 1943.

== See also ==
- List of dams in Japan
