= Kaerugo-ike Dam =

Dam in Kagawa Prefecture, Japan

- Location within Japan
- Official name: 蛙子池
- Location: Kagawa Prefecture, Japan
- Coordinates: 34°30′34″N 134°15′14″E
- Opening date: 1960

Dam and spillways
- Height: 15.3 m (50 ft)
- Length: 420 m (1,380 ft)

Reservoir
- Total capacity: 634 thousand cubic meters
- Catchment area: 2.4 sq. km
- Surface area: 9 hectares

Kaerugo-ike Dam (Japanese: 蛙子池) is an earthfill dam located in Kagawa Prefecture in Japan used for both flood control and irrigation. Its construction was completed in 1960. The catchment area is 2.4 km^{2}, and the dam's impoundment covers 9 ha when full at 634,000 m^{3} of water.

== See also ==
- List of dams in Japan
