= Naiba Dam =

Coordinates: 34.1687°N 134.0745°E

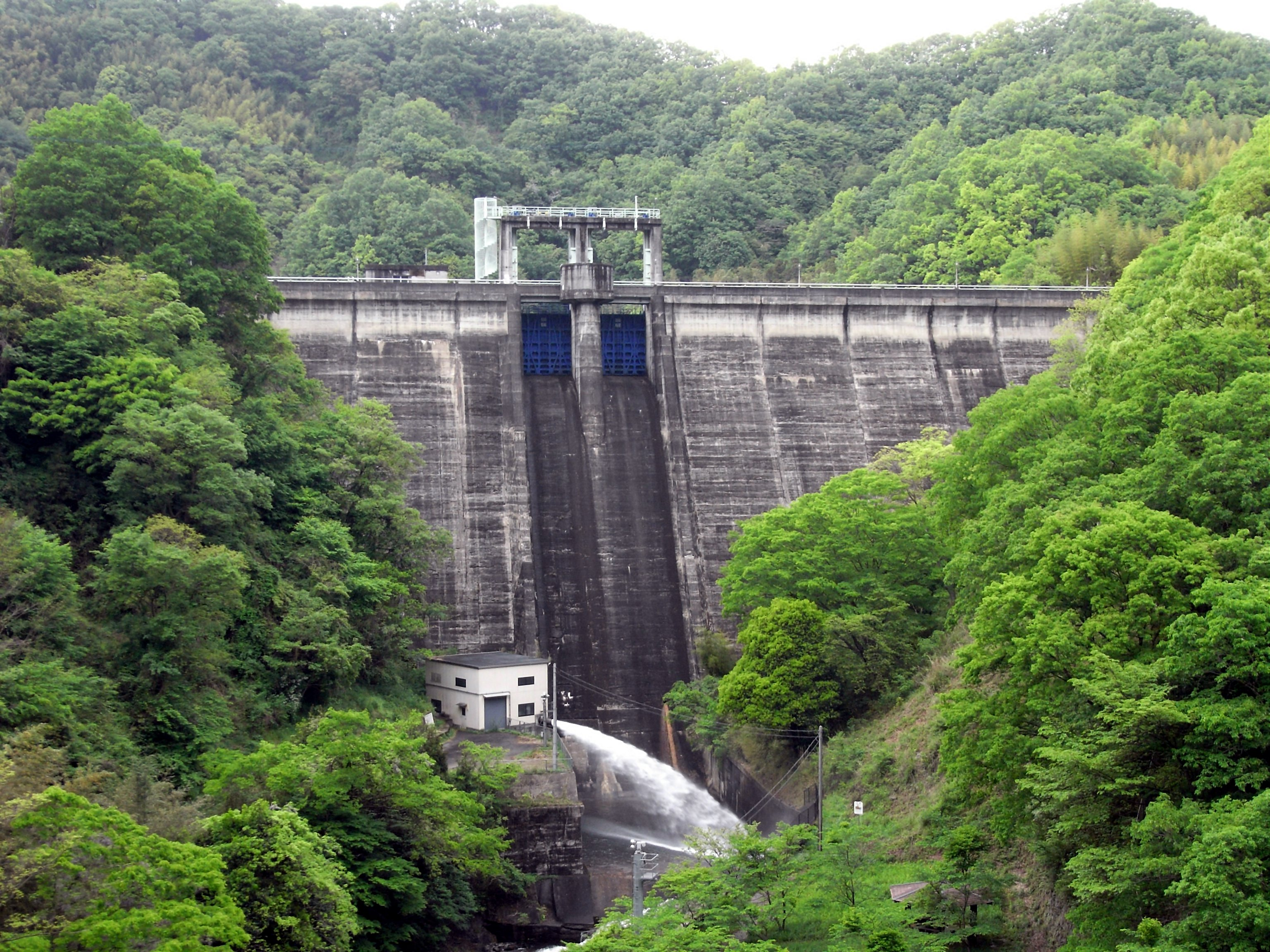
- Interactive map of Naiba Dam
- Official name: 内場ダム
- Location: Kagawa Prefecture, Japan
- Opening date: 1952

Dam and spillways
- Type of dam: Gravity dam
- Height: 50 m (160 ft)
- Length: 157.4 m (516 ft)
- Dam volume: 85,000 m^{3}

Reservoir
- Creates: Naiba Lake
- Total capacity: 8,175,000 m^{3}
- Catchment area: 28 km^{2}
- Surface area: 49 ha

Naiba Dam (内場ダム, Naiba damu) is a dam in Kagawa Prefecture, Japan, completed in 1952. The dam is 50 m high, and was built primarily for flood control and water supply maintenance.
