= Furu-ike Dam =

Dam in Ehime Prefecture, Japan

- Location within Japan
- Interactive map of Furu-ike Dam
- Location: Ehime Prefecture, Japan
- Coordinates: 34°5′01″N 132°56′49″E
- Opening date: 1870

Dam and spillways
- Height: 18 m (59 ft)
- Length: 70 m (230 ft)

Reservoir
- Total capacity: 25 thousand cubic meters
- Catchment area: 0.1 sq. km
- Surface area: 1 hectares

Furu-ike Dam is an earthfill dam located in Ehime Prefecture in Japan. The dam is used for irrigation. The catchment area of the dam is 0.1 km^{2}. The dam impounds about 1 ha of land when full and can store 25 thousand cubic meters of water. The construction of the dam was completed in 1870.
