= Kokage-ike Dam =

Dam in Kagawa Prefecture, Japan

- Location within Japan
- Official name: 小川下池
- Location: Kagawa Prefecture, Japan
- Coordinates: 34°13′17″N 134°7′39″E
- Opening date: 1973

Dam and spillways
- Height: 26.8 m (88 ft)
- Length: 156 m (512 ft)

Reservoir
- Total capacity: 600 thousand cubic meters
- Catchment area: 3.4 sq. km
- Surface area: 7 hectares

Kokage-ike Dam (Japanese: 小川下池) is an earthfill dam located in Kagawa Prefecture in Japan. The dam is used for irrigation. The catchment area of the dam is 3.4 km^{2}. The dam impounds about 7 ha of land when full and can store 600 thousand cubic meters of water. The construction of the dam was completed in 1973.

== See also ==
- List of dams in Japan
