= Mannoike Dam =

Dam in Kagawa Prefecture, Japan

Manno-ike Dam
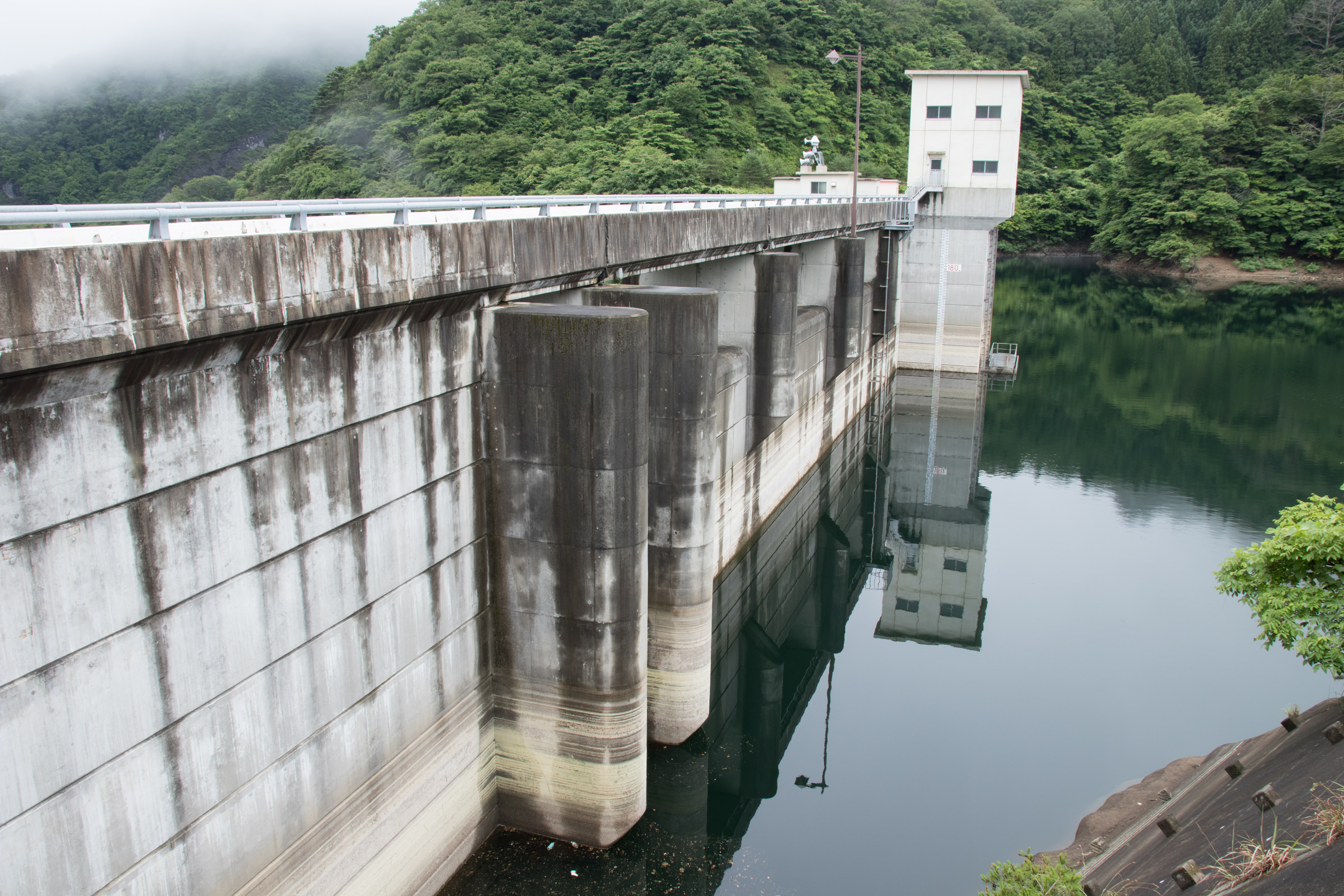

- Location within Japan
- Official name: 満濃池（再）
- Location: Kagawa Prefecture, Japan
- Coordinates: 34°9′54″N 133°51′55″E
- Opening date: 1959

Dam and spillways
- Height: 32 m (105 ft)
- Length: 155.8 m (511 ft)

Reservoir
- Total capacity: 15.4 million m^{3}
- Catchment area: 98.8 km^{2}
- Surface area: 139 hectares

Manno-ike Dam (Japanese: 満濃池（再）) is an earthfill dam located in Kagawa Prefecture in Japan. The dam is used for irrigation. The catchment area of the dam is 98.8 km^{2}. The dam impounds about 139 hectares of land when full and can store 15.4 million cubic meters of water. Construction of the dam was completed in 1959.
