= Ni-ike Dam =

Dam in Kagawa Prefecture, Japan

- Location within Japan
- Official name: 仁池
- Location: Kagawa Prefecture, Japan
- Coordinates: 34°14′19″N 133°52′19″E
- Opening date: 1967

Dam and spillways
- Height: 16 m (52 ft)
- Length: 328 m (1,076 ft)

Reservoir
- Total capacity: 1502 thousand cubic meters
- Surface area: 28 hectares

Ni-ike Dam (Japanese: 仁池) is an earthfill dam located in Kagawa Prefecture in Japan. The dam is used for irrigation. The dam impounds about 28 ha of land when full and can store 1502 thousand cubic meters of water. The construction of the dam was completed in 1967.

== See also ==
- List of dams in Japan
