= Shironotani-ike Dam =

Dam in Ehime Prefecture, Japan

- Location within Japan
- Location: Ehime Prefecture, Japan
- Coordinates: 33°53′07″N 133°7′38″E
- Opening date: 1953

Dam and spillways
- Height: 27.4 m (90 ft)
- Length: 133 m (436 ft)

Reservoir
- Total capacity: 287,000 m^{3} (10,100,000 cu ft)
- Catchment area: 2.1 km^{2} (0.81 sq mi)
- Surface area: 3 hectares (7.4 acres)

Shironotani-ike Dam is an earthfill dam located in Ehime Prefecture in Japan. The dam is used for irrigation. The catchment area of the dam is 2.1 km^{2}. The dam impounds about 3 ha of land when full and can store 287 thousand cubic meters of water. The construction of the dam was completed in 1953.
