= Kochi-ike Dam =

Dam in Kagawa Prefecture, Japan

Kochi-ike
- Location within Japan
- Official name: 河内池
- Location: Kagawa Prefecture, Japan
- Coordinates: 34°3′13″N 133°38′51″E
- Opening date: 1909

Dam and spillways
- Height: 17.8 m (58 ft)
- Length: 187 m (614 ft)

Reservoir
- Total capacity: 230 thousand cubic meters
- Surface area: 3 hectares

Kochi-ike (Japanese: 河内池) is an earthfill dam located in Kagawa Prefecture in Japan. The dam is used for irrigation. The dam impounds about 3 ha of land when full and can store 230 thousand cubic meters of water. The construction of the dam was completed in 1909.

== See also ==
- List of dams in Japan
