= Tajigawa Dam =

Dam in Kagawa Prefecture, Japan

- Location within Japan
- Official name: 多治川ダム
- Location: Kagawa Prefecture, Japan
- Coordinates: 34°6′56″N 133°49′59″E
- Opening date: 1957

Dam and spillways
- Height: 21.7 m (71 ft)
- Length: 48 m (157 ft)

Reservoir
- Total capacity: 200,000 m^{3} (7,100,000 cu ft)
- Catchment area: 5.5 km^{2} (2.1 sq mi)
- Surface area: 2 hectares (4.9 acres)

Tajigawa Dam (Japanese: 多治川ダム) is a gravity dam located in Kagawa Prefecture in Japan. The dam is used for flood control. The catchment area of the dam is 5.5 km^{2}. The dam impounds about 2 ha of land when full and can store 200 thousand cubic meters of water. The construction of the dam was completed in 1957.

== See also ==
- List of dams in Japan
