= Nakayama-ike Dam =

Dam in Kagawa Prefecture, Japan

- Location within Japan
- Official name: 中山池
- Location: Kagawa Prefecture, Japan
- Coordinates: 34°30′05″N 134°16′14″E
- Opening date: 1979

Dam and spillways
- Height: 17 m (56 ft)
- Length: 144 m (472 ft)

Reservoir
- Total capacity: 72 thousand cubic meters
- Catchment area: 2.5 sq. km
- Surface area: 2 hectares

Nakayama-ike Dam (Japanese: 中山池) is an earthfill dam located in Kagawa Prefecture in Japan. The dam is used for irrigation. The catchment area of the dam is 2.5 km^{2}. The dam impounds about 2 ha of land when full and can store 72 thousand cubic meters of water. The construction of the dam was completed in 1979.

== See also ==
- List of dams in Japan
