= Ishigami-ike Dam =

Dam in Kagawa Prefecture, Japan

Ishigami-ike
- Location within Japan
- Interactive map of Ishigami-ike
- Official name: 石神池
- Location: Kagawa Prefecture, Japan
- Coordinates: 34°14′16″N 134°10′41″E
- Opening date: 1963

Dam and spillways
- Height: 21 m (69 ft)
- Length: 200 m (660 ft)

Reservoir
- Total capacity: 790 thousand cubic meters
- Surface area: 10 hectares

Ishigami-ike (Japanese: 石神池) is an earthfill dam located in Kagawa Prefecture in Japan. The dam is used for irrigation. The dam impounds about 10 ha of land when full and can store 790 thousand cubic meters of water. The construction of the dam was completed in 1963.

== See also ==
- List of dams in Japan
