= Kototani-ike Dam =

Dam in Kagawa Prefecture, Japan

Kototani-ike
- Location within Japan
- Official name: 琴谷池
- Location: Kagawa Prefecture, Japan
- Coordinates: 34°13′01″N 134°0′38″E
- Construction began: 1985
- Opening date: 1987

Dam and spillways
- Height: 19.3 m (63 ft)
- Length: 173 m (568 ft)

Reservoir
- Total capacity: 65 thousand cubic meters
- Catchment area: 0.4 sq. km
- Surface area: 1 hectares

Kototani-ike (Japanese: 琴谷池) is an earthfill dam located in Kagawa Prefecture in Japan. The dam is used for flood control and irrigation. The catchment area of the dam is 0.4 km^{2}. The dam impounds about 1 ha of land when full and can store 65 thousand cubic meters of water. The construction of the dam was started on 1985 and completed in 1987.

== See also ==
- List of dams in Japan
