= Omogo No.3 Dam =

Dam in Ehime Prefecture, Japan

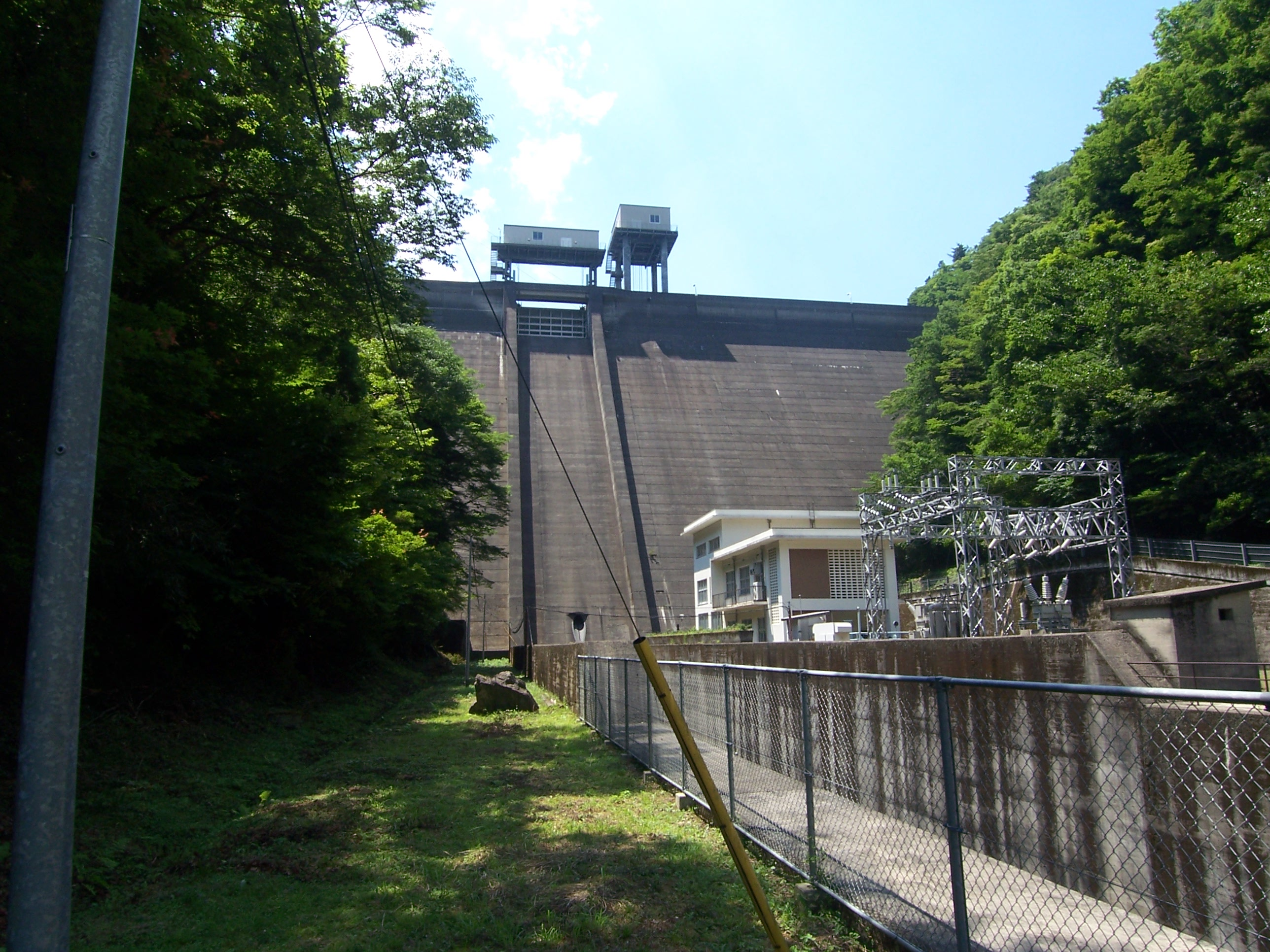

- Location within Japan
- Location: Ehime Prefecture, Japan
- Coordinates: 33°32′28″N 133°2′32″E
- Construction began: 1978
- Opening date: 1984

Dam and spillways
- Height: 42 m (138 ft)
- Length: 162 m (531 ft)

Reservoir
- Total capacity: 6,218,000 m^{3} (219,600,000 cu ft)
- Catchment area: 632.6 km^{2} (244.2 sq mi)
- Surface area: 44 hectares (110 acres)

Omogo No.3 Dam is a gravity dam located in Ehime Prefecture in Japan. The dam is used for power production. The catchment area of the dam is 632.6 km^{2}. The dam impounds about 44 ha of land when full and can store 6218 thousand cubic meters of water. The construction of the dam was started on 1978 and completed in 1984.
