= Kuratani-ike Dam =

Dam in Kagawa Prefecture, Japan

Kuratani-ike
- Location within Japan
- Official name: 鞍谷池
- Location: Kagawa Prefecture, Japan
- Coordinates: 34°19′44″N 133°55′19″E
- Opening date: 1981

Dam and spillways
- Height: 15 m (49 ft)
- Length: 100 m (330 ft)

Reservoir
- Total capacity: 110 thousand cubic meters
- Catchment area: 1 sq. km
- Surface area: 2 hectares

Kuratani-ike (Japanese: 鞍谷池) is an earthfill dam located in Kagawa Prefecture in Japan. The dam is used for irrigation. The catchment area of the dam is 1 km^{2}. The dam impounds about 2 ha of land when full and can store 110 thousand cubic meters of water. The construction of the dam was completed in 1981.

== See also ==
- List of dams in Japan
