= Uno-ike Dam =

Dam in Kagawa Prefecture, Japan

- Location within Japan
- Official name: 鵜生池
- Location: Kagawa Prefecture, Japan
- Coordinates: 34°15′38″N 133°59′23″E
- Opening date: 1976

Dam and spillways
- Height: 15.1 m (50 ft)
- Length: 236 m (774 ft)

Reservoir
- Total capacity: 337,000 m^{3} (11,900,000 cu ft)
- Catchment area: 0.2 km^{2} (0.077 sq mi)
- Surface area: 9 hectares (22 acres)

Uno-ike Dam (Japanese: 鵜生池) is an earthfill dam located in Kagawa Prefecture in Japan. The dam is used for irrigation. The catchment area of the dam is 0.2 km^{2}. The dam impounds about 9 ha of land when full and can store 337 thousand cubic meters of water. The construction of the dam was started on and completed in 1976.

== See also ==
- List of dams in Japan
