= Shikamori Dam =

Dam in Ehime Prefecture, Japan

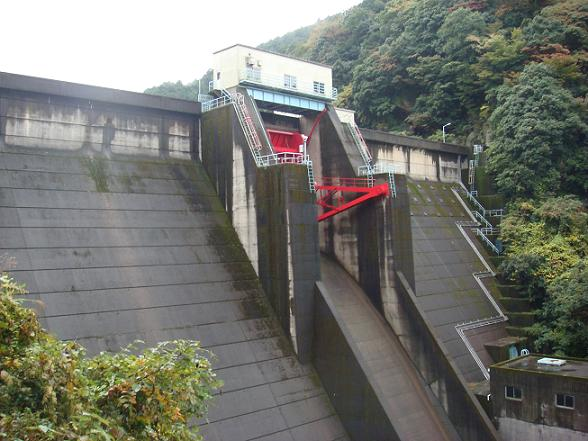

- Location within Japan
- Location: Ehime Prefecture, Japan
- Coordinates: 33°53′38″N 133°18′36″E
- Construction began: 1958
- Opening date: 1962

Dam and spillways
- Height: 57.9 m (190 ft)
- Length: 108.6 m (356 ft)

Reservoir
- Total capacity: 1,590,000 m^{3} (56,000,000 cu ft)
- Catchment area: 51.1 km^{2} (19.7 sq mi)
- Surface area: 8 hectares (20 acres)

Shikamori Dam is a gravity dam located in Ehime Prefecture in Japan. The dam is used for flood control, irrigation and power production. The catchment area of the dam is 51.1 km^{2}. The dam impounds about 8 ha of land when full and can store 1590 thousand cubic meters of water. The construction of the dam was started on 1958 and completed in 1962.
