= Sakase-ike Dam (Ehime) =

Dam in Ehime Prefecture, Japan

- Location within Japan
- Location: Ehime Prefecture, Japan
- Coordinates: 33°49′43″N 132°50′51″E
- Opening date: 1927

Dam and spillways
- Height: 24.9 m (82 ft)
- Length: 145 m (476 ft)

Reservoir
- Total capacity: 500,000 m^{3} (18,000,000 cu ft)
- Catchment area: 5.2 km^{2} (2.0 sq mi)
- Surface area: 5 hectares (12 acres)

Sakase-ike Dam is an earthfill dam located in Ehime Prefecture in Japan. The dam is used for irrigation. The catchment area of the dam is 5.2 km^{2}. The dam impounds about 5 ha of land when full and can store 500 thousand cubic meters of water. The construction of the dam was completed in 1927.
