= Kasen Dam =

Dam in Ehime Prefecture, Japan

- Location within Japan
- Interactive map of Kasen Dam
- Location: Ehime Prefecture, Japan
- Coordinates: 34°0′50″N 132°52′18″E
- Opening date: 1973

Dam and spillways
- Height: 41 m (135 ft)
- Length: 120 m (390 ft)

Reservoir
- Total capacity: 366 thousand cubic meters
- Catchment area: 3.9 sq. km
- Surface area: 3 hectares

Kasen Dam is an earthfill dam located in Ehime Prefecture in Japan. The dam is used for irrigation. The catchment area of the dam is 3.9 km^{2}. The dam impounds about 3 ha of land when full and can store 366 thousand cubic meters of water. The construction of the dam was completed in 1973.
