= Bicchuji-ike Dam =

Dam in Kagawa Prefecture, Japan

- Location within Japan
- Interactive map of Bicchuji-ike Dam
- Official name: 備中地池
- Location: Kagawa Prefecture, Japan
- Coordinates: 34°10′03″N 133°56′17″E
- Construction began: 1952
- Opening date: 1961

Dam and spillways
- Height: 21.6 m (71 ft)
- Length: 103 m (338 ft)

Reservoir
- Total capacity: 321 thousand cubic meters
- Catchment area: 1.8 sq. km
- Surface area: 6 hectares

Bicchuji-ike Dam (Japanese: 備中地池) is an earthfill dam located in Kagawa Prefecture in Japan. The dam is used for irrigation. The catchment area of the dam is 1.8 km^{2}. The dam impounds about 6 ha of land when full and can store 321 thousand cubic meters of water. The construction of the dam was started on 1952 and completed in 1961.

== See also ==
- List of dams in Japan
