= Okawa Dam (Kagawa) =

Dam in Kagawa Prefecture, Japan

- Location within Japan
- Official name: 大川ダム
- Location: Kagawa Prefecture, Japan
- Coordinates: 34°14′10″N 134°14′53″E
- Construction began: 1959
- Opening date: 1963

Dam and spillways
- Height: 36 m (118 ft)
- Length: 124 m (407 ft)

Reservoir
- Total capacity: 760,000 m^{3} (27,000,000 cu ft)
- Catchment area: 4 km^{2} (1.5 sq mi)
- Surface area: 8 hectares (20 acres)

Okawa Dam (Japanese: 大川ダム) is a gravity dam located in Kagawa Prefecture in Japan. The dam is used for flood control. The catchment area of the dam is 4 km^{2}. The dam impounds about 8 ha of land when full and can store 760 thousand cubic meters of water. The construction of the dam was started on 1959 and completed in 1963.

== See also ==
- List of dams in Japan
