= Oji-ike Dam =

Dam in Ehime Prefecture, Japan

- Location within Japan
- Location: Ehime Prefecture, Japan
- Coordinates: 33°54′56″N 133°14′22″E
- Opening date: 1951

Dam and spillways
- Height: 17.6 m (58 ft)
- Length: 112 m (367 ft)

Reservoir
- Total capacity: 75,000 m^{3} (2,600,000 cu ft)
- Catchment area: 5.6 km^{2} (2.2 sq mi)
- Surface area: 1 hectare (2.5 acres)

Oji-ike Dam is an earthfill dam located in Ehime Prefecture in Japan. The dam is used for irrigation. The catchment area of the dam is 5.6 km^{2}. The dam impounds about 1 ha of land when full and can store 75 thousand cubic meters of water. The construction of the dam was completed in 1951.
