= Matsuo-ike Dam =

Dam in Kagawa Prefecture, Japan

- Location within Japan
- Official name: 松尾池
- Location: Kagawa Prefecture, Japan
- Coordinates: 34°14′17″N 134°5′11″E
- Opening date: 1971

Dam and spillways
- Height: 18.7 m (61 ft)
- Length: 423 m (1,388 ft)

Reservoir
- Total capacity: 1322 thousand cubic meters
- Surface area: 24 hectares

Matsuo-ike Dam (Japanese: 松尾池) is an earthfill dam located in Kagawa Prefecture in Japan. The dam is used for irrigation. The dam impounds about 24 ha of land when full and can store 1322 thousand cubic meters of water. The construction of the dam was completed in 1971.

== See also ==
- List of dams in Japan
