= Nomura Dam =

Dam in Ehime Prefecture, Japan

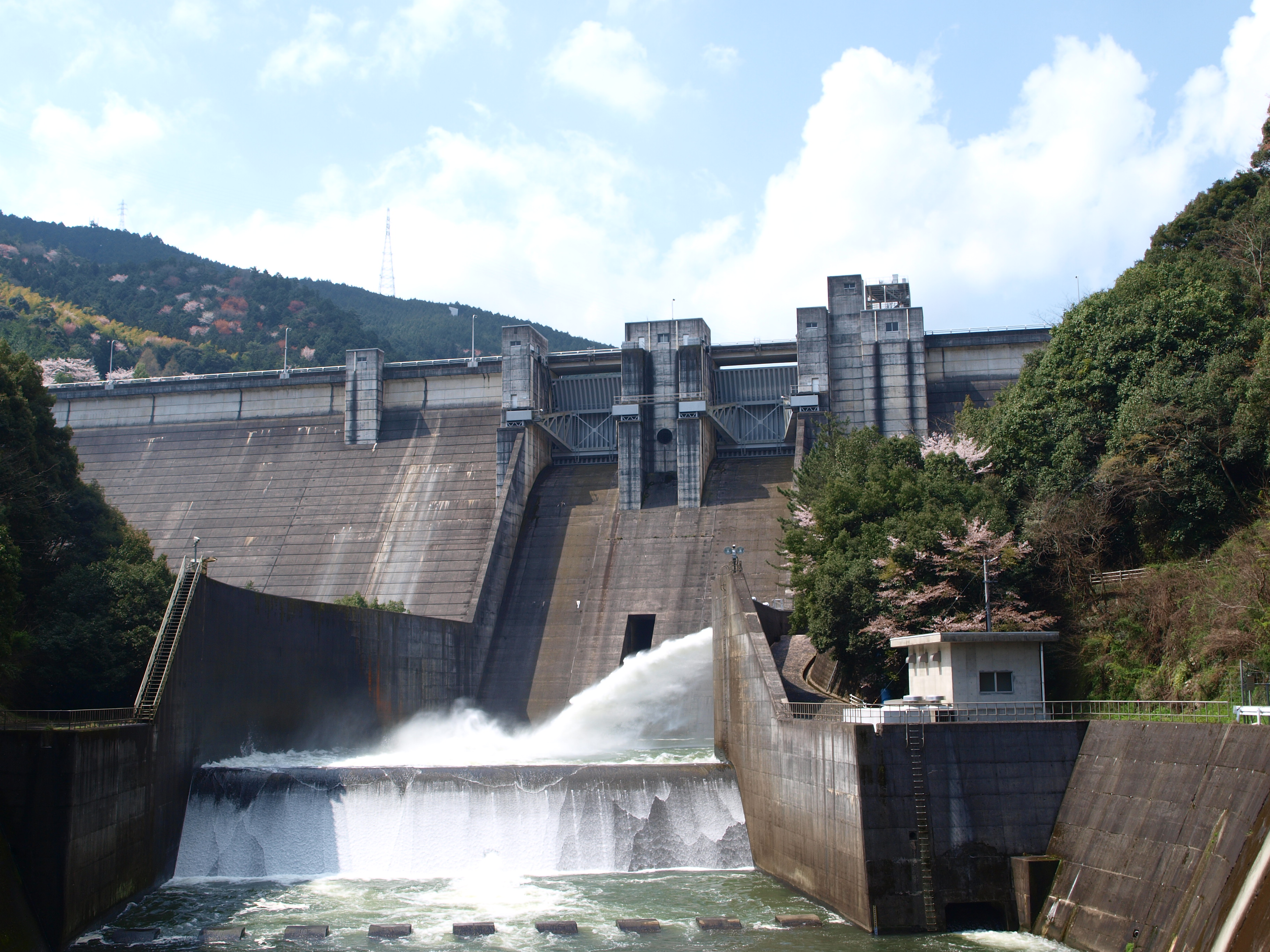

- Location within Japan
- Location: Ehime Prefecture, Japan
- Coordinates: 33°21′34″N 132°37′45″E
- Construction began: 1971
- Opening date: 1981

Dam and spillways
- Height: 60 m (200 ft)
- Length: 300 m (980 ft)

Reservoir
- Total capacity: 16,000,000 m^{3} (570,000,000 cu ft)
- Catchment area: 168 km^{2} (65 sq mi)
- Surface area: 95 hectares (230 acres)

Nomura Dam is a gravity dam located in Ehime Prefecture in Japan. The dam is used for flood control, irrigation and water supply. The catchment area of the dam is 168 km^{2}. The dam impounds about 95 ha of land when full and can store 16000 thousand cubic meters of water. The construction of the dam was started on 1971 and completed in 1981.
