= Shin-ike Dam (Aichi) =

Dam in Aichi Prefecture, Japan

- Location within Japan
- Location: Aichi Prefecture, Japan
- Coordinates: 34°57′11″N 137°12′01″E
- Construction began: 1988
- Opening date: 1989

Dam and spillways
- Height: 15.2 m (50 ft)
- Length: 48.5 m (159 ft)

Reservoir
- Total capacity: 22,000 m^{3} (780,000 cu ft)
- Catchment area: 0.2 km^{2} (0.077 sq mi)
- Surface area: 1 hectare (2.5 acres)

Shin-ike Dam is an earthfill dam located in Aichi Prefecture in Japan. The dam is used for irrigation. The catchment area of the dam is 0.2 km^{2}. The dam impounds about 1 ha of land when full and can store 22 thousand cubic meters of water. The construction of the dam was started on 1988 and completed in 1989.
