= Noguchi Dam =

Dam in Kagawa Prefecture, Japan

- Location within Japan
- Official name: 野口ダム
- Location: Kagawa Prefecture, Japan
- Coordinates: 34°8′12″N 133°52′47″E
- Opening date: 1966

Dam and spillways
- Height: 35 m (115 ft)
- Length: 123 m (404 ft)

Reservoir
- Total capacity: 1,150,000 m^{3} (41,000,000 cu ft)
- Catchment area: 12.2 km^{2} (4.7 sq mi)
- Surface area: 10 hectares (25 acres)

Noguchi Dam (Japanese: 野口ダム) is a gravity dam located in Kagawa Prefecture in Japan. The dam is used for flood control and irrigation. The catchment area of the dam is 12.2 km^{2}. The dam impounds about 10 ha of land when full and can store 1150 thousand cubic meters of water. The construction of the dam was completed in 1966.

== See also ==
- List of dams in Japan
