= Gogo Dam =

Dam in Kagawa Prefecture, Japan

- Location within Japan
- Interactive map of Gogo Dam
- Official name: 五郷ダム
- Location: Kagawa Prefecture, Japan
- Coordinates: 34°2′35″N 133°41′45″E
- Construction began: 1960
- Opening date: 1964

Dam and spillways
- Height: 50.5 m (166 ft)
- Length: 132 m (433 ft)

Reservoir
- Total capacity: 2500 thousand cubic meters
- Catchment area: 12.4 sq. km
- Surface area: 16 hectares

Gogo Dam (Japanese: 五郷ダム) is a gravity dam located in Kagawa Prefecture in Japan. The dam is used for flood control. The catchment area of the dam is 12.4 km^{2}. The dam impounds about 16 ha of land when full and can store 2500 thousand cubic meters of water. The construction of the dam was started on 1960 and completed in 1964.

== See also ==
- List of dams in Japan
