= Kamekoshi-ike Dam =

Dam in Kagawa Prefecture, Japan

- Location within Japan
- Interactive map of Kamekoshi-ike Dam
- Official name: 亀越池
- Location: Kagawa Prefecture, Japan
- Coordinates: 34°10′25″N 133°54′18″E
- Opening date: 1993

Dam and spillways
- Height: 19 m (62 ft)
- Length: 106 m (348 ft)

Reservoir
- Total capacity: 958 thousand cubic meters
- Surface area: 19 hectares

Kamekoshi-ike Dam (Japanese: 亀越池) is an earthfill dam located in Kagawa Prefecture in Japan. The dam is used for irrigation. The dam impounds about 19 ha of land when full and can store 958 thousand cubic meters of water. The construction of the dam was completed in 1993.

== See also ==
- List of dams in Japan
