= Tawatari-ike Dam =

Dam in Kagawa Prefecture, Japan

Tawatari-ike
- Location within Japan
- Official name: 田渡池
- Location: Kagawa Prefecture, Japan
- Coordinates: 34°12′53″N 134°2′12″E
- Opening date: 1928

Dam and spillways
- Height: 18.4 m (60 ft)
- Length: 132 m (433 ft)

Reservoir
- Total capacity: 246,000 m^{3} (8,700,000 cu ft)
- Surface area: 4 hectares (9.9 acres)

Tawatari-ike (Japanese: 田渡池) is an earthfill dam located in Kagawa Prefecture in Japan. The dam is used for irrigation. The dam impounds about 4 ha of land when full and can store 246 thousand cubic meters of water. The construction of the dam was completed in 1928.

== See also ==
- List of dams in Japan
