= Kawamata-ike Dam =

Dam in Kagawa Prefecture, Japan

Kawamata-ike
- Location within Japan
- Official name: 川股池
- Location: Kagawa Prefecture, Japan
- Coordinates: 34°10′13″N 134°25′16″E
- Opening date: 1962

Dam and spillways
- Height: 26 m (85 ft)
- Length: 103 m (338 ft)

Reservoir
- Total capacity: 272 thousand cubic meters
- Catchment area: 7 sq. km
- Surface area: 4 hectares

Kawamata-ike (Japanese: 川股池) is a gravity dam located in Kagawa Prefecture in Japan. The dam is used for irrigation and its catchment area is 7 km^{2}. The dam impounds about 4 ha of land, when full and can store 272 thousand cubic meters of water. The construction of the dam was completed in 1962.

== See also ==
- List of dams in Japan
