= Shikogawa Dam =

Dam in Ehime Prefecture, Japan

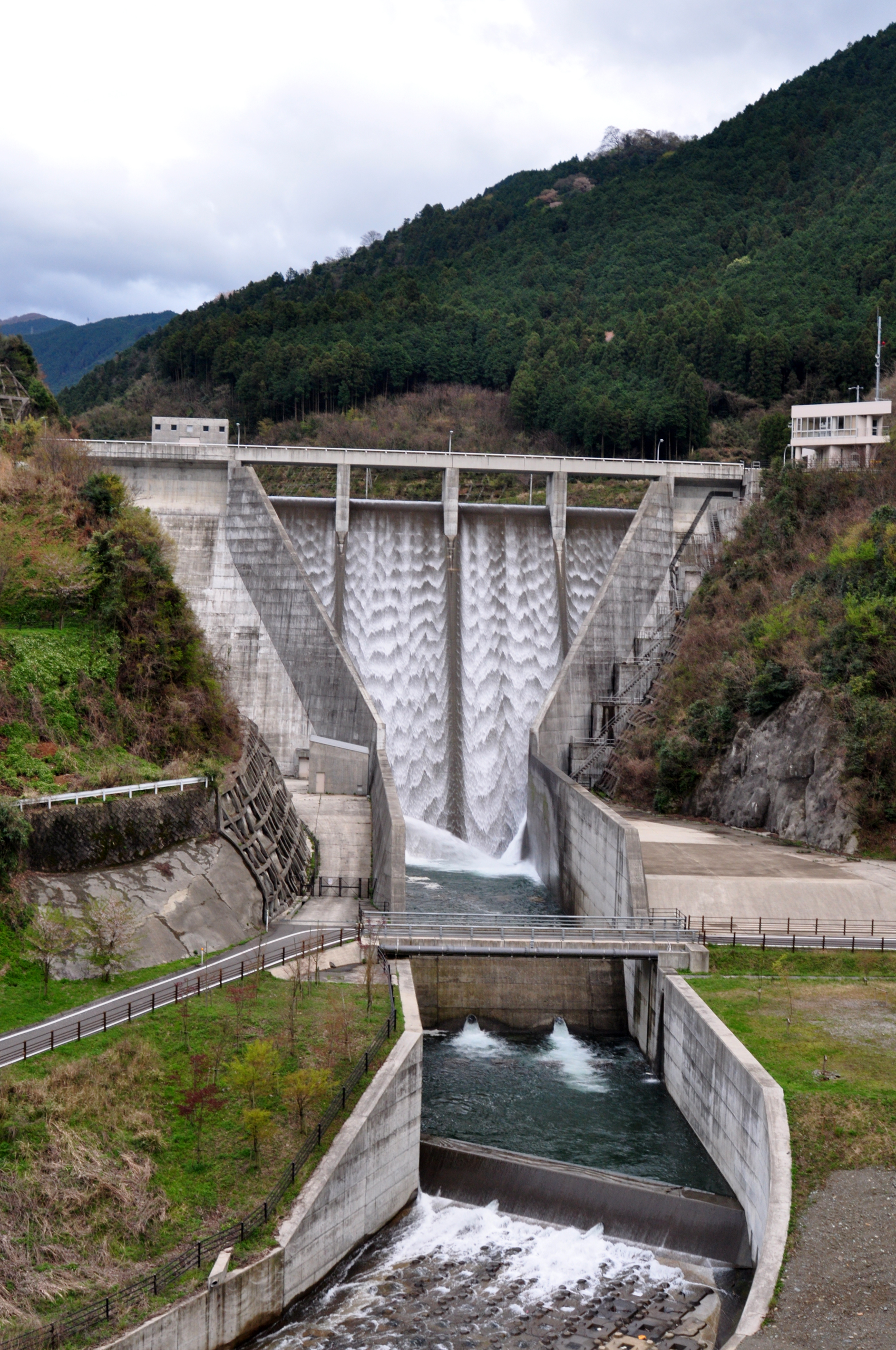

- Location within Japan
- Location: Ehime Prefecture, Japan
- Coordinates: 33°51′05″N 133°1′26″E
- Construction began: 1987
- Opening date: 2010

Dam and spillways
- Height: 48.2 m (158 ft)
- Length: 117 m (384 ft)

Reservoir
- Total capacity: 1,300,000 m^{3} (46,000,000 cu ft)
- Catchment area: 17.2 km^{2} (6.6 sq mi)
- Surface area: 8 hectares (20 acres)

Shikogawa Dam is a gravity dam located in Ehime Prefecture in Japan. It is used for irrigation and power production. The catchment area of the dam is 17.2 km^{2}. The dam impounds about 8 ha of land when full and can store 1300 thousand cubic metres of water. The construction of the dam was started in 1987 and completed in 2010.
