= Yamatosaka Dam =

Dam in Ehime Prefecture, Japan

- Location within Japan
- Location: Ehime Prefecture, Japan
- Coordinates: 33°27′33″N 132°42′07″E
- Construction began: 1986
- Opening date: 2026

Dam and spillways
- Height: 103 m (338 ft)
- Length: 282 m (925 ft)

Reservoir
- Total capacity: 24,900,000 m^{3} (880,000,000 cu ft)
- Catchment area: 64.7 km^{2} (25.0 sq mi)
- Surface area: 76 hectares (190 acres)

Yamatosaka Dam is a gravity dam located in Ehime Prefecture in Japan. The dam will be used for flood control. The catchment area of the dam is 64.7 km^{2}. The dam impounds about 76 ha of land when full and can store 24900 thousand cubic meters of water. The construction of the dam was started on 1986 and will be completed in 2026.
