= Ikenotani-ike Dam =

Dam in Ehime Prefecture, Japan

- Location within Japan
- Interactive map of Ikenotani-ike Dam
- Location: Ehime Prefecture, Japan
- Coordinates: 33°53′16″N 133°5′34″E
- Construction began: 1911
- Opening date: 1913

Dam and spillways
- Height: 16 m (52 ft)
- Length: 122 m (400 ft)

Reservoir
- Total capacity: 101 thousand cubic meters
- Catchment area: 0.6 sq. km
- Surface area: 2 hectares

Ikenotani-ike Dam is an earthfill dam located in Ehime Prefecture in Japan. The dam is used for irrigation. The catchment area of the dam is 0.6 km^{2}. The dam impounds about 2 ha of land when full and can store 101 thousand cubic meters of water. The construction of the dam was started on 1911 and completed in 1913.
