= Jinnai-ike Dam =

Dam in Kagawa Prefecture, Japan

Jinnai-ike
- Location within Japan
- Interactive map of Jinnai-ike
- Official name: 神内池
- Location: Kagawa Prefecture, Japan
- Coordinates: 34°14′01″N 134°4′21″E
- Opening date: 1969

Dam and spillways
- Height: 15.2 m (50 ft)
- Length: 249 m (817 ft)

Reservoir
- Total capacity: 1160 thousand cubic meters
- Catchment area: 12.4 sq. km
- Surface area: 35 hectares

Jinnai-ike (Japanese: 神内池) is an earthfill dam located in Kagawa Prefecture in Japan. The dam is used for irrigation. The catchment area of the dam is 12.4 km^{2}. The dam impounds about 35 ha of land when full and can store 1160 thousand cubic meters of water. The construction of the dam was completed in 1969.

== See also ==
- List of dams in Japan
