= Yashiro Dam (Ehime) =

Dam in Ehime Prefecture, Japan

- Location within Japan
- Location: Ehime Prefecture, Japan
- Coordinates: 33°26′03″N 132°25′25″E
- Construction began: 1973
- Opening date: 1975

Dam and spillways
- Height: 24.2 m (79 ft)
- Length: 93.2 m (306 ft)

Reservoir
- Total capacity: 26,000 m^{3} (920,000 cu ft)
- Catchment area: 0.6 km^{2} (0.23 sq mi)
- Surface area: 1 hectare (2.5 acres)

Yashiro Dam is an earthfill dam located in Ehime Prefecture in Japan. The dam is used for irrigation. The catchment area of the dam is 0.6 km^{2}. The dam impounds about 1 ha of land when full and can store 26 thousand cubic meters of water. The construction of the dam was started on 1973 and completed in 1975.
