= Yamanokami-ike Dam =

Dam in Ehime Prefecture, Japan

- Location within Japan
- Location: Ehime Prefecture, Japan
- Coordinates: 32°58′30″N 132°37′57″E
- Construction began: 1958
- Opening date: 1963

Dam and spillways
- Height: 17.5 m (57 ft)
- Length: 76 m (249 ft)

Reservoir
- Total capacity: 123,000 m^{3} (4,300,000 cu ft)
- Catchment area: sq. km
- Surface area: 2 hectares (4.9 acres)

Yamanokami-ike Dam is an earthfill dam located in Ehime Prefecture in Japan. The dam is used for irrigation and water supply. The catchment area of the dam is km^{2}. The dam impounds about 2 ha of land when full and can store 123 thousand cubic meters of water. The construction of the dam was started on 1958 and completed in 1963.
