= Daimyojin-ike Dam =

Dam in Ehime Prefecture, Japan

Daimyojin-ike
- Location within Japan
- Interactive map of Daimyojin-ike
- Location: Ehime Prefecture, Japan
- Coordinates: 33°57′06″N 133°1′45″E
- Construction began: 1955
- Opening date: 1962

Dam and spillways
- Height: 25.8 m (85 ft)
- Length: 212.4 m (697 ft)

Reservoir
- Total capacity: 450 thousand cubic meters
- Catchment area: 1.5 sq. km
- Surface area: 5 hectares

Daimyojin-ike is an earthfill dam located in Ehime Prefecture in southwestern Japan. The dam is used for irrigation. The catchment area of the dam is 1.5 km^{2}. The dam spans about 5 ha of land when full and can store 450,000 cubic meters of water. The construction of the dam was started on 1955 and completed in 1962.
