= Ohtani Dam (Shimane) =

Dam in Shimane Prefecture, Japan

- Location within Japan
- Location: Shimane Prefecture, Japan
- Coordinates: 35°24′11″N 133°2′56″E
- Construction began: 1954
- Opening date: 1957

Dam and spillways
- Height: 35 m (115 ft)
- Length: 101 m (331 ft)

Reservoir
- Total capacity: 1,422,000 m^{3} (50,200,000 cu ft)
- Catchment area: 3.9 km^{2} (1.5 sq mi)
- Surface area: 14 hectares (35 acres)

Ohtani Dam is a gravity dam located in Shimane Prefecture in Japan. The dam is used for water supply. The catchment area of the dam is 3.9 km^{2}. The dam impounds about 14 ha of land when full and can store 1422 thousand cubic meters of water. The construction of the dam was started on 1954 and completed in 1957.
