= Futamatauwa-ike Dam =

Dam in Kagawa Prefecture, Japan

Futamatauwa-ike
- Location within Japan
- Interactive map of Futamatauwa-ike
- Official name: 二股上池
- Location: Kagawa Prefecture, Japan
- Coordinates: 34°13′59″N 134°9′50″E
- Opening date: 2002

Dam and spillways
- Height: 16 m (52 ft)
- Length: 217 m (712 ft)

Reservoir
- Total capacity: 606 thousand cubic meters
- Surface area: 10 hectares

Futamatauwa-ike (Japanese: 二股上池) is an earthfill dam located in Kagawa Prefecture in Japan. The dam is used for irrigation. The dam impounds about 10 ha of land when full and can store 606 thousand cubic meters of water. The construction of the dam was completed in 2002.

== See also ==
- List of dams in Japan
