= Tateiwa Dam (Ehime) =

Dam in Ehime Prefecture, Japan

- Location within Japan
- Location: Ehime Prefecture, Japan
- Coordinates: 33°58′28″N 132°52′23″E
- Construction began: 1973
- Opening date: 1980

Dam and spillways
- Height: 48.2 m (158 ft)
- Length: 175 m (574 ft)

Reservoir
- Total capacity: 802,000 m^{3} (28,300,000 cu ft)
- Catchment area: 6.8 km^{2} (2.6 sq mi)
- Surface area: 6 hectares (15 acres)

Tateiwa Dam is an earthfill dam located in Ehime Prefecture in Japan. The dam is used for irrigation. The catchment area of the dam is 6.8 km^{2}. The dam impounds about 6 ha of land when full and can store 802 thousand cubic meters of water. The construction of the dam was started on 1973 and completed in 1980.
