= Monnyu Dam =

Dam in Kagawa Prefecture, Japan

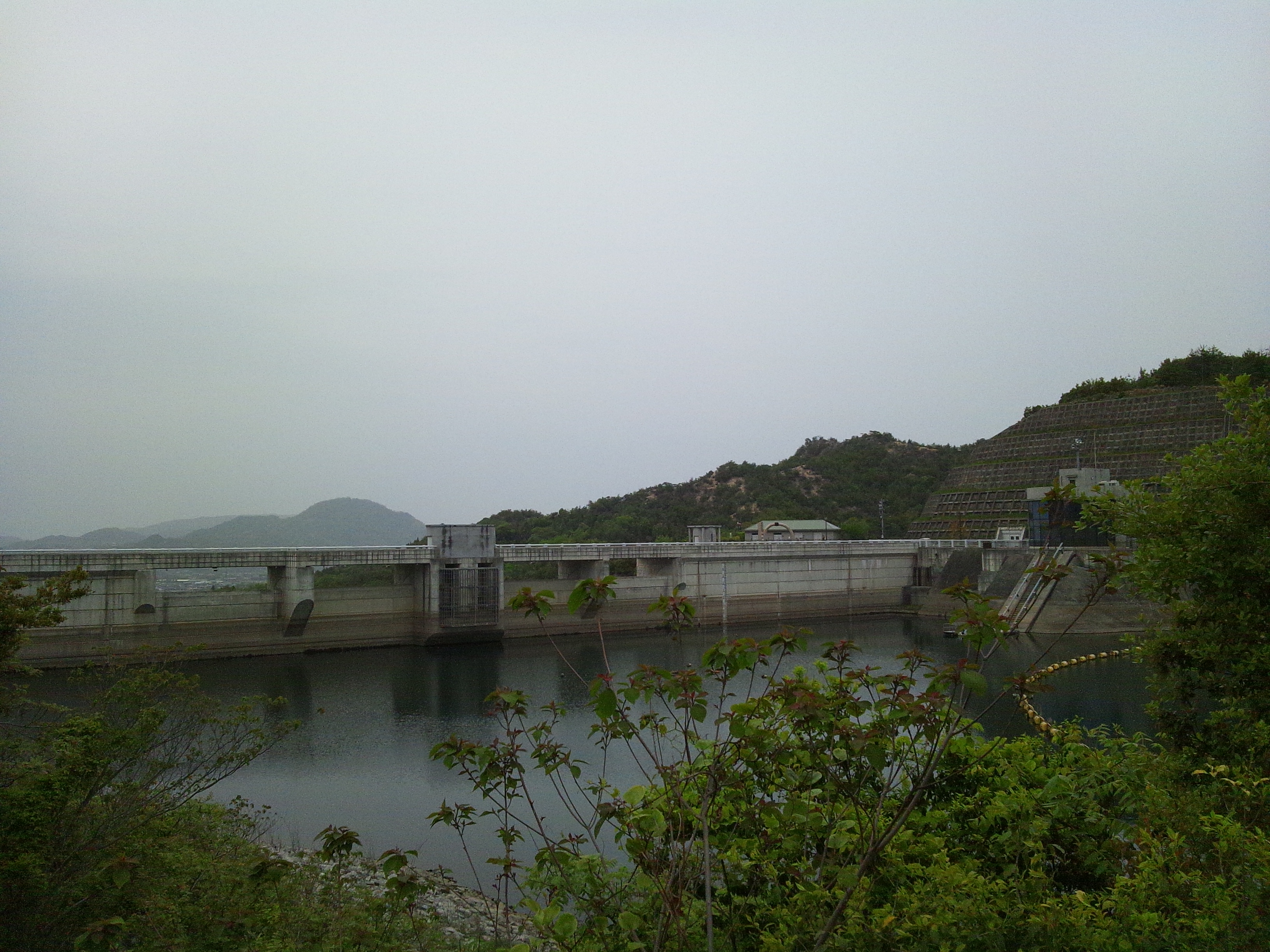

- Location within Japan
- Official name: 門入ダム
- Location: Kagawa Prefecture, Japan
- Coordinates: 34°14′57″N 134°13′09″E
- Construction began: 1980
- Opening date: 1998

Dam and spillways
- Height: 47.3 m (155 ft)
- Length: 202.5 m (664 ft)

Reservoir
- Total capacity: 2900 thousand cubic meters
- Catchment area: 3.7 sq. km
- Surface area: 21 hectares

Monnyu Dam (Japanese: 門入ダム) is a gravity dam located in Kagawa Prefecture in Japan. The dam is used for flood control and water supply. The catchment area of the dam is 3.7 km^{2}. The dam impounds about 21 ha of land when full and can store 2900 thousand cubic meters of water. The construction of the dam was started on 1980 and completed in 1998.

== See also ==
- List of dams in Japan
