= Taman Dam =

Dam in Kagawa Prefecture, Japan

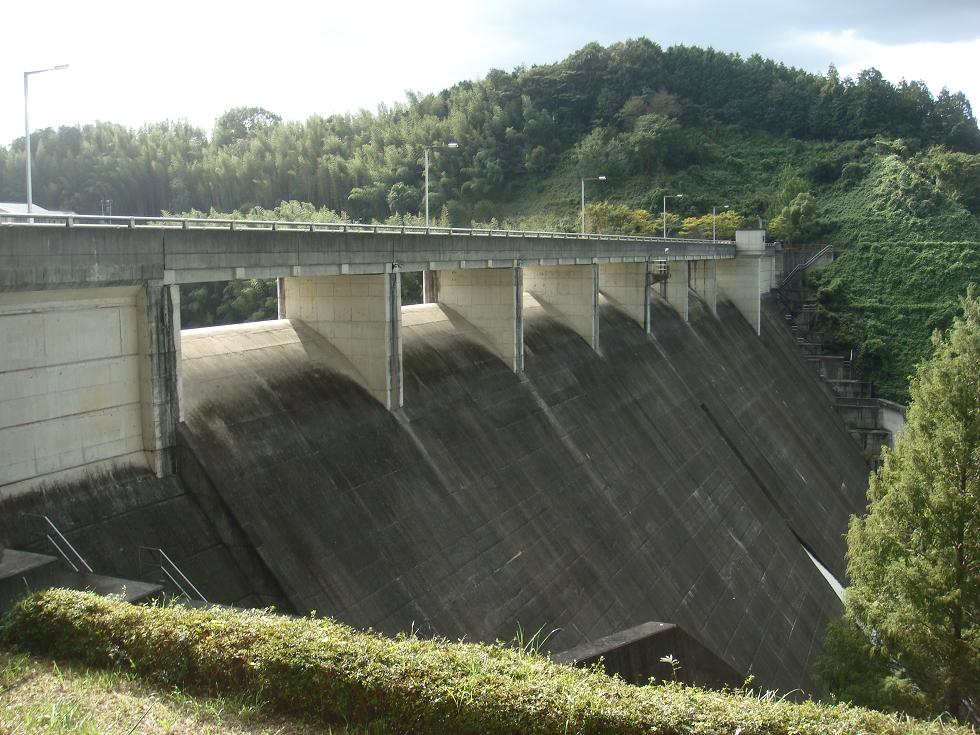

- Location within Japan
- Official name: 田万ダム
- Location: Kagawa Prefecture, Japan
- Coordinates: 34°11′26″N 134°0′10″E
- Construction began: 1978
- Opening date: 1989

Dam and spillways
- Height: 49 m (161 ft)
- Length: 180 m (590 ft)

Reservoir
- Total capacity: 1,600,000 m^{3} (57,000,000 cu ft)
- Catchment area: 5 km^{2} (1.9 sq mi)
- Surface area: 12 hectares (30 acres)

Taman Dam (Japanese: 田万ダム) is a gravity dam located in Kagawa Prefecture in Japan. The dam is used for flood control. The catchment area of the dam is 5 km^{2}. The dam impounds about 12 ha of land when full and can store 1600 thousand cubic meters of water. The construction of the dam was started on 1978 and completed in 1989.

== See also ==
- List of dams in Japan
