= Yoshifuji-ike Dam =

Dam in Ehime Prefecture, Japan

Yoshifuji-ike
- Location within Japan
- Location: Ehime Prefecture, Japan
- Coordinates: 33°52′17″N 132°46′02″E
- Construction began: 1953
- Opening date: 1956

Dam and spillways
- Height: 24.2 m (79 ft)
- Length: 100 m (330 ft)

Reservoir
- Total capacity: 325,000 m^{3} (11,500,000 cu ft)
- Catchment area: 1.4 km^{2} (0.54 sq mi)
- Surface area: 3 hectares (7.4 acres)

Yoshifuji-ike is an earthfill dam located in Ehime Prefecture in Japan. The dam is used for irrigation. The catchment area of the dam is 1.4 km^{2}. The dam impounds about 3 ha of land when full and can store 325 thousand cubic meters of water. The construction of the dam was started on 1953 and completed in 1956.
