= Fukigawa Choseichi Dam =

Dam in Ehime Prefecture, Japan

- Location within Japan
- Interactive map of Fukigawa Choseichi Dam
- Location: Ehime Prefecture, Japan
- Coordinates: 33°25′49″N 132°26′38″E
- Construction began: 1973
- Opening date: 1985

Dam and spillways
- Height: 33.7 m (111 ft)
- Length: 110 m (360 ft)

Reservoir
- Total capacity: 197 thousand cubic meters
- Catchment area: 2.3 sq. km
- Surface area: 3 hectares

Fukigawa Choseichi Dam is a gravity dam located in Ehime Prefecture in Japan. The dam is used for irrigation and water supply. The catchment area of the dam is 2.3 km^{2}. The dam impounds about 3 ha of land when full and can store 197 thousand cubic meters of water. The construction of the dam was started on 1973 and completed in 1985.
