= Senzoku Dam (Kagawa) =

Dam in Kagawa Prefecture, Japan

- Location within Japan
- Official name: 千足ダム
- Location: Kagawa Prefecture, Japan
- Coordinates: 34°11′19″N 134°23′24″E
- Construction began: 1975
- Opening date: 1987

Dam and spillways
- Height: 41.4 m (136 ft)
- Length: 197 m (646 ft)

Reservoir
- Total capacity: 1,850,000 m^{3} (65,000,000 cu ft)
- Catchment area: 5.1 km^{2} (2.0 sq mi)
- Surface area: 14 hectares (35 acres)

Senzoku Dam (Japanese: 千足ダム) is a gravity dam located in Kagawa Prefecture in Japan. The dam is used for flood control and water supply. The catchment area of the dam is 5.1 km^{2}. The dam impounds about 14 ha of land when full and can store 1850 thousand cubic meters of water. The construction of the dam was started on 1975 and completed in 1987.

== See also ==
- List of dams in Japan
