= Mikuro-ike Dam =

Dam in Kagawa Prefecture, Japan

Mikuro-ike
- Location within Japan
- Official name: 弥勒池
- Location: Kagawa Prefecture, Japan
- Coordinates: 34°15′20″N 134°14′40″E
- Opening date: 1975

Dam and spillways
- Height: 16.8 m (55 ft)
- Length: 96 m (315 ft)

Reservoir
- Total capacity: 236 thousand cubic meters
- Surface area: 4 hectares

Mikuro-ike (Japanese: 弥勒池) is an earthfill dam located in Kagawa Prefecture in Japan. The dam is used for irrigation. The dam impounds about 4 ha of land when full and can store 236 thousand cubic meters of water. The construction of the dam was completed in 1975.

== See also ==
- List of dams in Japan
