= Kinbuchi-ike Dam =

Dam in Kagawa Prefecture, Japan

- Location within Japan
- Official name: 公淵池
- Location: Kagawa Prefecture, Japan
- Coordinates: 34°14′41″N 134°6′15″E
- Opening date: 1933

Dam and spillways
- Height: 27.1 m (89 ft)
- Length: 260 m (850 ft)

Reservoir
- Total capacity: 1793 thousand cubic meters
- Surface area: 26 hectares

Kinbuchi-ike Dam (Japanese: 公淵池) is an earthfill dam located in Kagawa Prefecture in Japan. The dam is used for irrigation. The dam impounds about 26 ha of land when full and can store 1793 thousand cubic meters of water. The construction of the dam was completed in 1933.

== See also ==
- List of dams in Japan
