= Choshi Dam =

Dam in Ehime Prefecture, Japan

- Location within Japan
- Interactive map of Choshi Dam
- Location: Ehime Prefecture, Japan
- Coordinates: 33°41′52″N 132°47′24″E
- Construction began: 1972
- Opening date: 1977

Dam and spillways
- Height: 47.2 m (155 ft)
- Length: 142 m (466 ft)

Reservoir
- Total capacity: 780 thousand cubic meters
- Catchment area: 3.5 sq. km
- Surface area: 7 hectares

Choshi Dam is a rockfill dam located in Ehime Prefecture in Japan. The dam is located on the island of Shikoku and is used for irrigation. The catchment area of the dam is 3.5 km^{2}. The dam impounds about 7 ha of land when full and can store 780 thousand cubic meters of water. The construction of the dam was started on 1972 and completed in 1977.
