= Ikata Choseichi Dam =

Dam in Ehime Prefecture, Japan

- Location within Japan
- Interactive map of Ikata Choseichi Dam
- Location: Ehime Prefecture, Japan
- Coordinates: 33°28′52″N 132°20′00″E
- Construction began: 1973
- Opening date: 1989

Dam and spillways
- Height: 29.1 m (95 ft)
- Length: 108 m (354 ft)

Reservoir
- Total capacity: 104 thousand cubic meters
- Catchment area: 0.8 sq. km
- Surface area: 1 hectares

Ikata Choseichi Dam is a gravity dam located in Ehime Prefecture in Japan. The dam is used for irrigation and water supply. The catchment area of the dam is 0.8 km^{2}. The dam impounds about 1 ha of land when full and can store 104 thousand cubic meters of water. The construction of the dam was started on 1973 and completed in 1989.
