= Awaji Dam =

Dam in Kagawa Prefecture, Japan

- Location within Japan
- Interactive map of Awaji Dam
- Official name: 粟地ダム
- Location: Kagawa Prefecture, Japan
- Coordinates: 34°29′29″N 134°19′18″E
- Construction began: 1972
- Opening date: 1980

Dam and spillways
- Height: 46 m (151 ft)
- Length: 290 m (950 ft)

Reservoir
- Total capacity: 780 thousand cubic meters
- Catchment area: 2.7 sq. km
- Surface area: 6 hectares

Awaji Dam (Japanese: 粟地ダム) is a gravity dam located in Kagawa Prefecture in Japan. The dam is used for flood control and water supply. The catchment area of the dam is 2.7 km^{2}. The dam impounds about 6 ha of land when full and can store 780 thousand cubic meters of water. The construction of the dam was started on 1972 and completed in 1980.

== See also ==
- List of dams in Japan
