= Shoji-ike Dam =

Dam in Kagawa Prefecture, Japan

Shoji-ike
- Location within Japan
- Official name: 小路池
- Location: Kagawa Prefecture, Japan
- Coordinates: 34°11′00″N 134°24′23″E
- Opening date: 1937

Dam and spillways
- Height: 17.5 m (57 ft)
- Length: 101 m (331 ft)

Reservoir
- Total capacity: 230,000 m^{3} (8,100,000 cu ft)
- Catchment area: 7.6 km^{2} (2.9 sq mi)
- Surface area: 3 hectares (7.4 acres)

Shoji-ike (Japanese: 小路池) is an earthfill dam located in Kagawa Prefecture in Japan. The dam is used for irrigation. The catchment area of the dam is 7.6 km^{2}. The dam impounds about 3 ha of land when full and can store 230 thousand cubic meters of water. The construction of the dam was completed in 1937.

== See also ==
- List of dams in Japan
