= Nagara Dam (Kagawa) =

Dam in Kagawa Prefecture, Japan

Nagara Dam (Re)
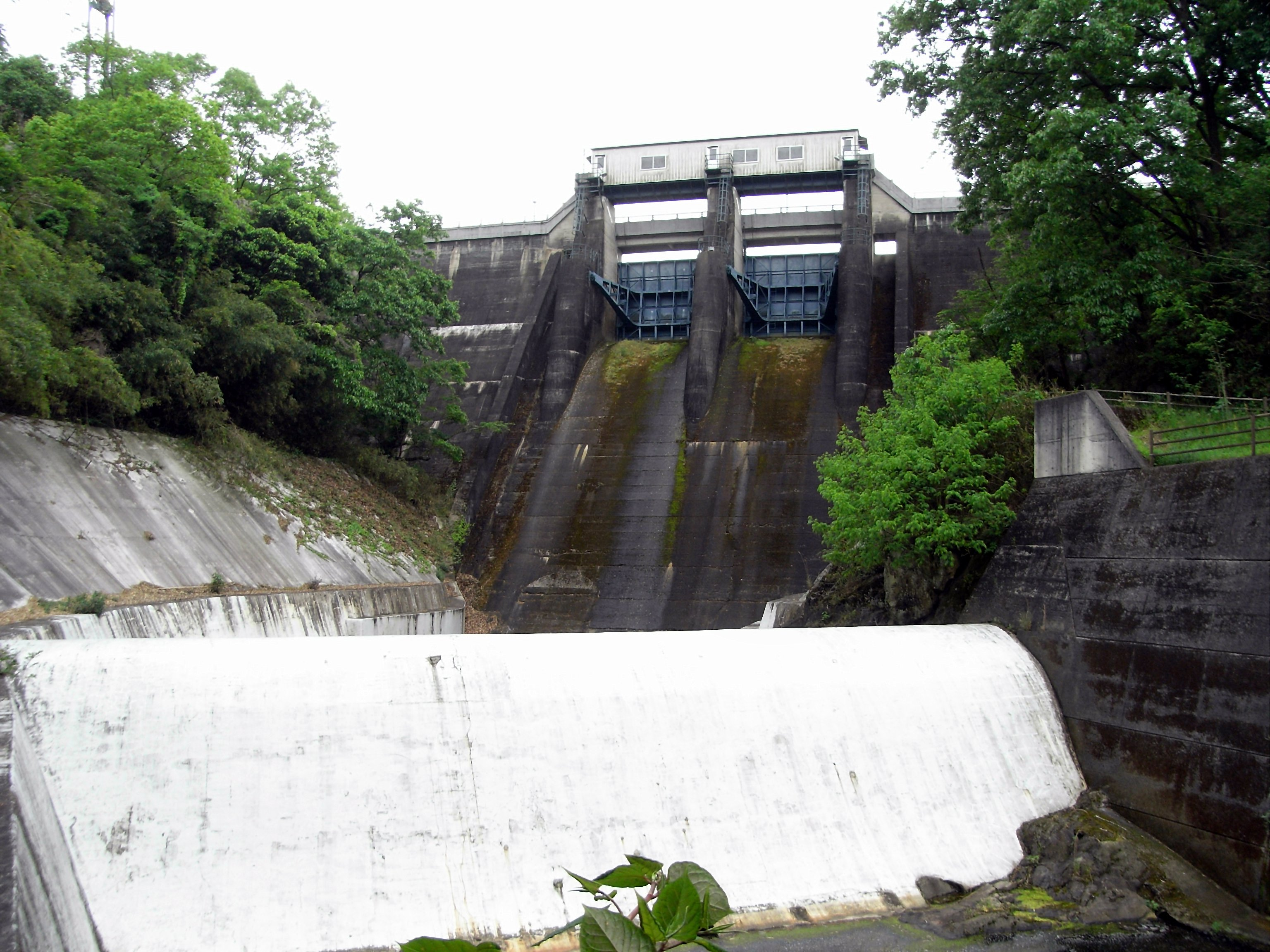

- Location within Japan
- Official name: 長柄ダム（再）
- Location: Kagawa Prefecture, Japan
- Coordinates: 34°11′46″N 133°58′36″E
- Construction began: 1995

Dam and spillways
- Height: 42.6 m (140 ft)
- Length: 190 m (620 ft)

Reservoir
- Total capacity: 10200 thousand cubic meters
- Catchment area: 32 sq. km
- Surface area: 63 hectares

Nagara Dam (Re) (Japanese: 長柄ダム（再）) is a gravity dam located in Kagawa Prefecture in Japan. The dam is used for flood control. The catchment area of the dam is 32 km^{2}. The dam impounds about 63 ha of land when full and can store 10200 thousand cubic meters of water. The construction of the dam was started on 1995.

== See also ==
- List of dams in Japan
