= Bozo-ike Dam =

Dam in Ehime Prefecture, Japan

Bozo-ike
- Location within Japan
- Interactive map of Bozo-ike
- Location: Ehime Prefecture, Japan
- Coordinates: 34°2′43″N 132°53′42″E
- Opening date: 1940

Dam and spillways
- Height: 15.5 m (51 ft)
- Length: 68 m (223 ft)

Reservoir
- Total capacity: 12 thousand cubic meters
- Catchment area: 1.4 sq. km
- Surface area: 1 hectares

Bozo-ike is an earthfill dam located in Ehime Prefecture in southwestern Japan. The dam is used for irrigation. The catchment area of the dam is 1.4 km^{2}. The dam impounds about 1 ha of land when full and can store 12,000 cubic meters of water. The construction of the dam was completed in 1940.
