= Gomyo Dam =

Dam in Kagawa Prefecture, Japan

- Location within Japan
- Interactive map of Gomyo Dam
- Official name: 五名ダム（再）
- Location: Kagawa Prefecture, Japan
- Coordinates: 34°11′53″N 134°16′26″E
- Construction began: 1995

Dam and spillways
- Height: 55.4 m (182 ft)
- Length: 236 m (774 ft)

Reservoir
- Total capacity: 6450 thousand cubic meters
- Catchment area: 10.4 sq. km

Gomyo Dam (Japanese: 五名ダム（再）) is a gravity dam located in Kagawa Prefecture in Japan. The dam is used for flood control and water supply. The catchment area of the dam is 10.4 km^{2}. The dam can store 6450 thousand cubic meters of water. The construction of the dam was started on 1995.

== See also ==
- List of dams in Japan
