= Iwase-ike Dam =

Dam in Kagawa Prefecture, Japan

Iwase-ike
- Location within Japan
- Interactive map of Iwase-ike
- Official name: 岩瀬池
- Location: Kagawa Prefecture, Japan
- Coordinates: 34°9′54″N 133°46′05″E
- Opening date: 1967

Dam and spillways
- Height: 17.6 m (58 ft)
- Length: 152 m (499 ft)

Reservoir
- Total capacity: 1016 thousand cubic meters
- Surface area: 24 hectares

Iwase-ike (Japanese: 岩瀬池) is an earthfill dam located in Kagawa Prefecture in Japan. The dam is used for irrigation. The dam impounds about 24 ha of land when full and can store 1016 thousand cubic meters of water. The construction of the dam was completed in 1967.

== See also ==
- List of dams in Japan
