= Asakura Dam =

Dam in Ehime Prefecture, Japan

- Location within Japan
- Location: Ehime Prefecture, Japan
- Coordinates: 33°57′27″N 133°0′20″E
- Construction began: 1972
- Opening date: 1981

Dam and spillways
- Height: 47 m (154 ft)
- Length: 253 m (830 ft)

Reservoir
- Total capacity: 1400 thousand cubic meters
- Catchment area: 7.7 sq. km
- Surface area: 9 hectares

Asakura Dam (Japanese: 朝倉ダム, あさくらだむ) is an earthfill dam located in Ehime Prefecture in southwestern Japan, some 600 km west of the capital Tokyo. The dam is used for irrigation. The catchment area of the dam is 7.7 km^{2}. The dam impounds about 9 ha of land when full and can store 1400 thousand cubic meters of water. The construction of the dam commenced in 1972 and completed in 1981.
