= Ohuchi Dam (Kagawa) =

Dam in Kagawa Prefecture, Japan

- Location within Japan
- Official name: 大内ダム
- Location: Kagawa Prefecture, Japan
- Coordinates: 34°13′19″N 134°17′51″E
- Construction began: 1963
- Opening date: 1966

Dam and spillways
- Height: 26 m (85 ft)
- Length: 121.2 m (398 ft)

Reservoir
- Total capacity: 1,000,000 m^{3} (35,000,000 cu ft)
- Catchment area: 3.2 km^{2} (1.2 sq mi)
- Surface area: 13 hectares (32 acres)

Ohuchi Dam (Japanese: 大内ダム) is a gravity dam located in Kagawa Prefecture in Japan. The dam is used for flood control and water supply. The catchment area of the dam is 3.2 km^{2}. The dam impounds about 13 ha of land when full and can store 1000 thousand cubic meters of water. The construction of the dam was started on 1963 and completed in 1966.

== See also ==
- List of dams in Japan
