= Inuzuka-ike Dam =

Dam in Ehime Prefecture, Japan

犬塚池 / Inuzuka-ike Dam
- Location within Japan
- Interactive map of 犬塚池 / Inuzuka-ike Dam
- Location: Imabari, Ehime Prefecture, Japan
- Coordinates: 34°1′25″N 132°58′38″E
- Construction began: 1935
- Opening date: 1938

Dam and spillways
- Type of dam: Earth fill dam
- Height: 18.5 m (61 ft)
- Length: 207 m (679 ft)

Reservoir
- Total capacity: 609,000 m^{3}
- Catchment area: 3.8 km^{2}
- Surface area: 11 ha

Inuzuka-ike Dam (犬塚池, Inuzuka-ike) is an earthfill dam located near the city of Imabari in Ehime Prefecture in Japan and used for irrigation. The catchment area of the dam is 3.8 square kilometres. The dam impounds about 11 hectares of land when full and can store 609 thousand cubic meters of water. The construction of the dam was started in 1935 and completed by 1938.
