= Sako Dam =

Dam in Ehime Prefecture, Japan

- Location within Japan
- Location: Ehime Prefecture, Japan
- Coordinates: 33°45′59″N 132°52′29″E
- Construction began: 1989
- Opening date: 2001

Dam and spillways
- Height: 31 m (102 ft)
- Length: 210 m (690 ft)

Reservoir
- Total capacity: 1,110,000 m^{3} (39,000,000 cu ft)
- Catchment area: 4.1 km^{2} (1.6 sq mi)
- Surface area: 11 hectares (27 acres)

Sako Dam is a gravity dam located in Ehime Prefecture in Japan. The dam is used for irrigation. The catchment area of the dam is 4.1 km^{2}. The dam impounds about 11 ha of land when full and can store 1110 thousand cubic meters of water. The construction of the dam was started on 1989 and completed in 2001.
