= Goten Dam =

Dam in Kagawa Prefecture, Japan

- Location within Japan
- Interactive map of Goten Dam
- Official name: 御殿ダム
- Location: Kagawa Prefecture, Japan
- Coordinates: 34°19′54″N 134°0′57″E
- Construction began: 1937
- Opening date: 1954

Dam and spillways
- Height: 17 m (56 ft)
- Length: 497 m (1,631 ft)

Reservoir
- Total capacity: 524 thousand cubic meters
- Catchment area: 0.5 sq. km
- Surface area: 8 hectares

Goten Dam (Japanese: 御殿ダム) is an earthfill dam located in Kagawa Prefecture in Japan. The dam is used for water supply. The catchment area of the dam is 0.5 km^{2}. The dam impounds about 8 ha of land when full and can store 524 thousand cubic meters of water. The construction of the dam was started on 1937 and completed in 1954.

== See also ==
- List of dams in Japan
