= Togawa Dam =

Dam in Kagawa Prefecture, Japan

- Location within Japan
- Official name: 戸川ダム
- Location: Kagawa Prefecture, Japan
- Coordinates: 34°6′34″N 133°47′52″E
- Opening date: 1957

Dam and spillways
- Height: 19.6 m (64 ft)
- Length: 177 m (581 ft)

Reservoir
- Total capacity: 211,000 m^{3} (7,500,000 cu ft)
- Catchment area: 8.4 km^{2} (3.2 sq mi)
- Surface area: 4 hectares (9.9 acres)

The Togawa Dam (Japanese: 戸川ダム) is an earthfill dam located in the Kagawa Prefecture in Japan. The dam is used for flood control and irrigation. The catchment area of the dam is 8.4 km^{2}. The dam impounds about 4 ha of land when full and can store 211 thousand cubic meters of water. The construction of the dam was completed in 1957.

== See also ==
- List of dams in Japan
