= Ryutakuji-ike Dam =

Dam in Ehime Prefecture, Japan

- Location within Japan
- Location: Ehime Prefecture, Japan
- Coordinates: 33°21′33″N 132°42′42″E
- Construction began: 1953
- Opening date: 1955

Dam and spillways
- Height: 27.3 m (90 ft)
- Length: 99 m (325 ft)

Reservoir
- Total capacity: 100,000 m^{3} (3,500,000 cu ft)
- Catchment area: 2.2 km^{2} (0.85 sq mi)
- Surface area: 2 hectares (4.9 acres)

Ryutakuji-ike Dam is an earthfill dam located in Ehime Prefecture in Japan. The dam is used for irrigation. The catchment area of the dam is 2.2 km^{2}. The dam impounds about 2 ha of land when full and can store 100 thousand cubic meters of water. The construction of the dam was started on 1953 and completed in 1955.
