= Kabagawa Dam =

Dam in Kagawa Prefecture, Japan

- Location within Japan
- Interactive map of Kabagawa Dam
- Official name: 椛川ダム
- Location: Kagawa Prefecture, Japan
- Coordinates: 34°9′12″N 134°6′21″E
- Construction began: 1994

Dam and spillways
- Height: 88.5 m (290 ft)
- Length: 265.5 m (871 ft)

Reservoir
- Total capacity: 10560 thousand cubic meters
- Catchment area: 8.7 sq. km
- Surface area: 38 hectares

Kabagawa Dam (Japanese: 椛川ダム) is a gravity dam located in Kagawa Prefecture in Japan. The dam is used for flood control and water supply. The catchment area of the dam is 8.7 km^{2}. The dam impounds about 38 ha of land when full and can store 10560 thousand cubic meters of water. The construction of the dam was started on 1994.

== See also ==
- List of dams in Japan
