= Nishiyama-ike Dam =

Dam in Ehime Prefecture, Japan

- Location within Japan
- Location: Ehime Prefecture, Japan
- Coordinates: 33°54′20″N 133°1′53″E
- Opening date: 1955

Dam and spillways
- Height: 24.2 m (79 ft)
- Length: 64 m (210 ft)

Reservoir
- Total capacity: 95,000 m^{3} (3,400,000 cu ft)
- Catchment area: 0.1 km^{2} (0.039 sq mi)
- Surface area: 2 hectares (4.9 acres)

Nishiyama-ike Dam is an earthfill dam located in Ehime Prefecture in Japan. The dam is used for irrigation. The catchment area of the dam is 0.1 km^{2}. The dam impounds about 2 ha of land when full and can store 95 thousand cubic meters of water. The construction of the dam was completed in 1955.
