= Sugagawa Dam =

Dam in Ehime Prefecture, Japan

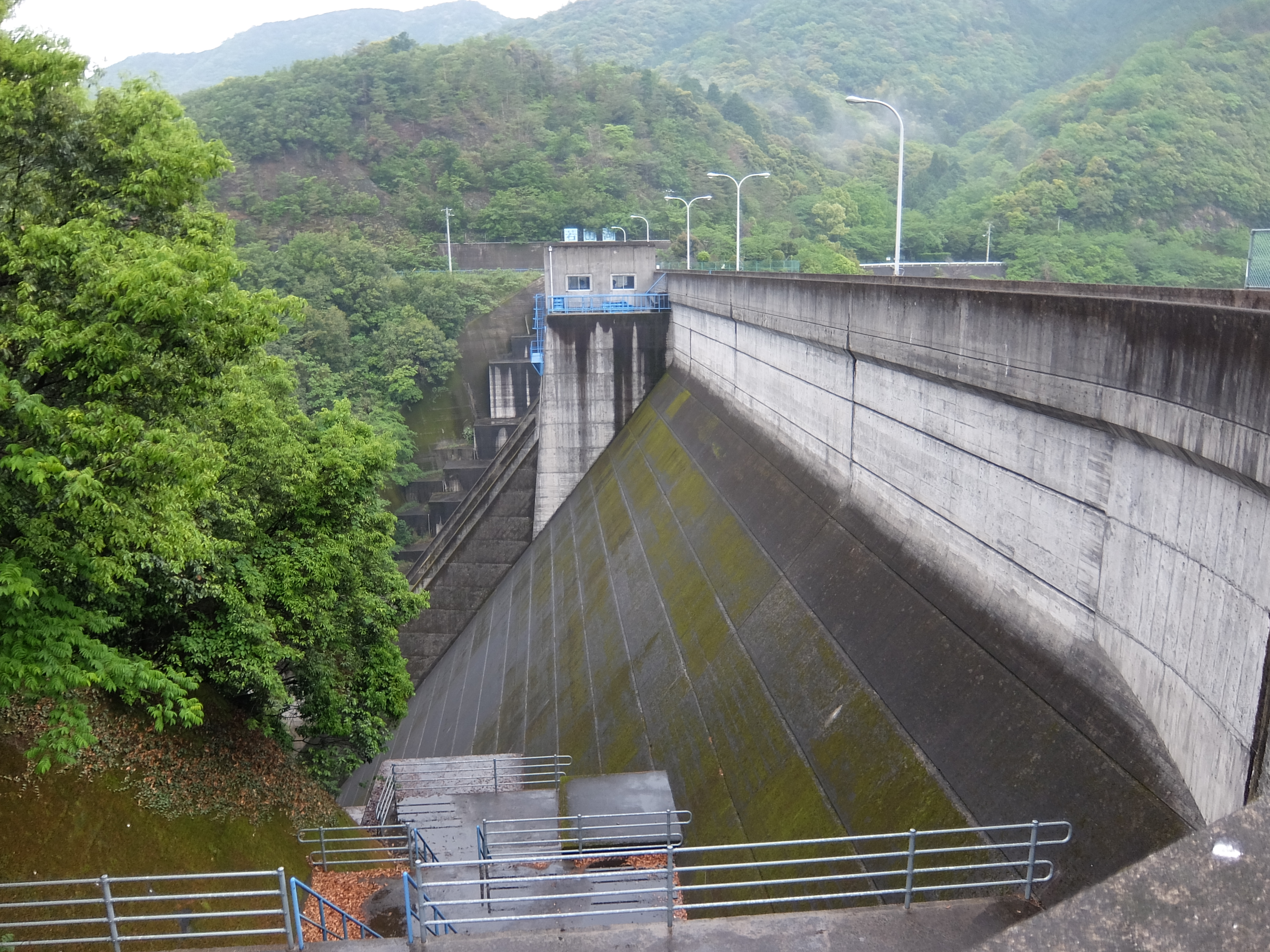

- Location within Japan
- Location: Ehime Prefecture, Japan
- Coordinates: 33°14′31″N 132°35′28″E
- Construction began: 1969
- Opening date: 1975

Dam and spillways
- Height: 40.2 m (132 ft)
- Length: 159.5 m (523 ft)

Reservoir
- Total capacity: 3,050,000 m^{3} (108,000,000 cu ft)
- Catchment area: 14 km^{2} (5.4 sq mi)
- Surface area: 22 hectares (54 acres)

Sugagawa Dam is a gravity dam located in Ehime Prefecture in Japan. The dam is used for flood control and water supply. The catchment area of the dam is 14 km^{2}. The dam impounds about 22 ha of land when full and can store 3,050 thousand cubic meters of water. The construction of the dam was started on 1969 and completed in 1975.
