= Ohkuboyama Dam =

Dam in Ehime Prefecture, Japan

- Location within Japan
- Location: Ehime Prefecture, Japan
- Coordinates: 33°0′37″N 132°37′31″E
- Construction began: 1973
- Opening date: 1979

Dam and spillways
- Height: 55.8 m (183 ft)
- Length: 170 m (560 ft)

Reservoir
- Total capacity: 750,000 m^{3} (26,000,000 cu ft)
- Catchment area: 5.5 km^{2} (2.1 sq mi)
- Surface area: 6 hectares (15 acres)

Ohkuboyama Dam is an earthfill dam located in Ehime Prefecture in Japan. The dam is used for irrigation and water supply. The catchment area of the dam is 5.5 km^{2}. The dam impounds about 6 ha of land when full and can store 750 thousand cubic meters of water. The construction of the dam was started on 1973 and completed in 1979.
