= Uchinomi Dam =

Dam in Kagawa Prefecture, Japan

Uchinomi Dam (Re)
- Location within Japan
- Official name: 内海ダム（再）
- Location: Kagawa Prefecture, Japan
- Coordinates: 34°29′42″N 134°17′59″E
- Construction began: 1997
- Opening date: 2013

Dam and spillways
- Height: 43 m (141 ft)
- Length: 423 m (1,388 ft)

Reservoir
- Total capacity: 1,060,000 m^{3} (37,000,000 cu ft)
- Catchment area: 4.8 km^{2} (1.9 sq mi)
- Surface area: 8 hectares (20 acres)

Uchinomi Dam (Re) (Japanese: 内海ダム（再）) is a gravity dam located in Kagawa Prefecture in Japan. The dam is used for flood control and water supply. The catchment area of the dam is 4.8 km^{2}. The dam impounds about 8 ha of land when full and can store 1060 thousand cubic meters of water. The construction of the dam was started on 1997 and completed in 2013.

== See also ==
- List of dams in Japan
