= Sogoku-ike Dam =

Dam in Kagawa Prefecture, Japan

Sogoku-ike
- Location within Japan
- Official name: 宗極池
- Location: Kagawa Prefecture, Japan
- Coordinates: 34°12′07″N 134°25′12″E
- Opening date: 1956

Dam and spillways
- Height: 27.3 m (90 ft)
- Length: 113 m (371 ft)

Reservoir
- Total capacity: 240,000 m^{3} (8,500,000 cu ft)
- Catchment area: 1 km^{2} (0.39 sq mi)
- Surface area: 5 hectares (12 acres)

Sogoku-ike (Japanese: 宗極池) is an earthfill dam located in Kagawa Prefecture in Japan. The dam is used for irrigation. The catchment area of the dam is 1 km^{2}. The dam impounds about 5 ha of land when full and can store 240 thousand cubic meters of water. The construction of the dam was completed in 1956.

== See also ==
- List of dams in Japan
