= Ishitegawa Dam =

Dam in Ehime Prefecture, Japan

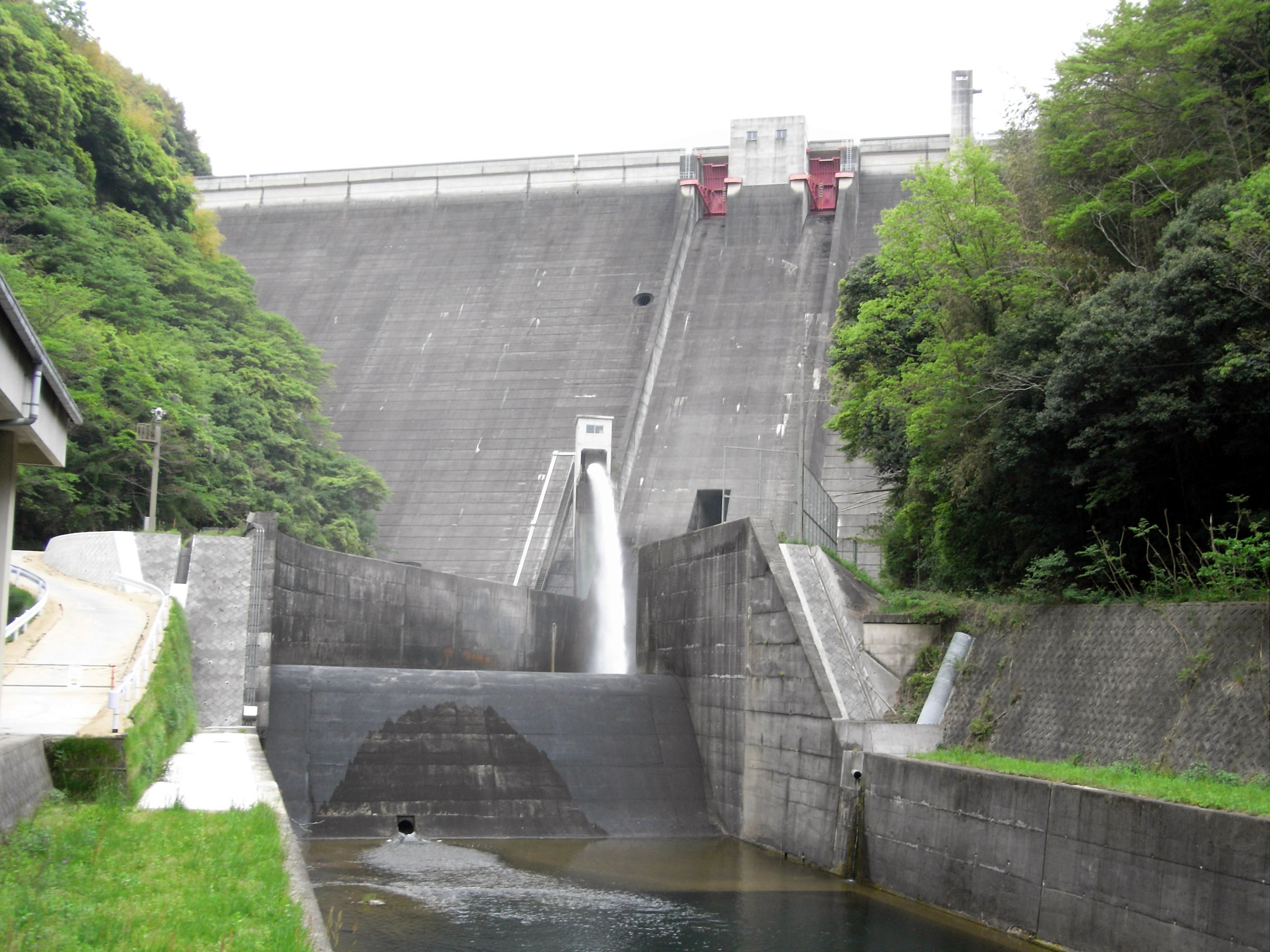

- Location within Japan
- Interactive map of Ishitegawa Dam
- Location: Ehime Prefecture, Japan
- Coordinates: 33°52′46″N 132°50′16″E
- Construction began: 1966
- Opening date: 1972

Dam and spillways
- Height: 87 m (285 ft)
- Length: 277.7 m (911 ft)

Reservoir
- Total capacity: 12800 thousand cubic meters
- Catchment area: 72.6 sq. km
- Surface area: 50 hectares

Ishitegawa Dam is a gravity dam located in Ehime Prefecture in Japan. The dam is used for flood control, irrigation and water supply. The catchment area of the dam is 72.6 km^{2}. The dam impounds about 50 ha of land when full and can store 12800 thousand cubic meters of water. The construction of the dam was started on 1966 and completed in 1972.
