= Shinnakayama-ike Dam =

Dam in Kagawa Prefecture, Japan

Shinnakayama-ike
- Location within Japan
- Official name: 新中山池
- Location: Kagawa Prefecture, Japan
- Coordinates: 34°30′06″N 134°15′57″E
- Construction began: 1951
- Opening date: 1961

Dam and spillways
- Height: 26 m (85 ft)
- Length: 182 m (597 ft)

Reservoir
- Total capacity: 600,000 m^{3} (21,000,000 cu ft)
- Catchment area: 4.3 km^{2} (1.7 sq mi)
- Surface area: 6 hectares (15 acres)

Shinnakayama-ike (Japanese: 新中山池) is an earthfill dam located in Kagawa Prefecture in Japan. The dam is used for irrigation. The catchment area of the dam is 4.3 km^{2}. The dam impounds about 6 ha of land when full and can store 600 thousand cubic meters of water. The construction of the dam was started on 1951 and completed in 1961.

== See also ==
- List of dams in Japan
