= Yokotani Choseichii Dam =

Dam in Ehime Prefecture, Japan

Yokotani Choseichii
- Location within Japan
- Location: Ehime Prefecture, Japan
- Coordinates: 33°51′32″N 132°49′00″E
- Construction began: 1957
- Opening date: 1967

Dam and spillways
- Height: 31 m (102 ft)
- Length: 74.4 m (244 ft)

Reservoir
- Total capacity: 502,000 m^{3} (17,700,000 cu ft)
- Catchment area: 4.2 km^{2} (1.6 sq mi)
- Surface area: 6 hectares (15 acres)

Yokotani Choseichii is a rockfill dam located in Ehime Prefecture in Japan. The dam is used for irrigation. The catchment area of the dam is 4.2 km^{2}. The dam impounds about 6 ha of land when full and can store 502 thousand cubic meters of water. The construction of the dam was started on 1957 and completed in 1967.
