= Hananoyama-ike Dam =

Dam in Kagawa Prefecture, Japan

- Location within Japan
- Interactive map of Hananoyama-ike Dam
- Official name: 花の山池
- Location: Kagawa Prefecture, Japan
- Coordinates: 34°14′33″N 134°11′53″E
- Opening date: 1979

Dam and spillways
- Height: 21.5 m (71 ft)
- Length: 75 m (246 ft)

Reservoir
- Total capacity: 200 thousand cubic meters
- Catchment area: 1 sq. km
- Surface area: 3 hectares

Hananoyama-ike Dam (Japanese: 花の山池) is an earthfill dam located in Kagawa Prefecture in Japan. The dam is used for irrigation. The catchment area of the dam is 1 km^{2}. The dam impounds about 3 ha of land when full and can store 200 thousand cubic meters of water. The construction of the dam was completed in 1979.

== See also ==
- List of dams in Japan
