= Iseki-ike Dam =

Dam in Kagawa Prefecture, Japan

Iseki-ike
- Location within Japan
- Interactive map of Iseki-ike
- Official name: 井関池
- Location: Kagawa Prefecture, Japan
- Coordinates: 34°3′57″N 133°41′09″E
- Opening date: 1982

Dam and spillways
- Height: 16 m (52 ft)
- Length: 350 m (1,150 ft)

Reservoir
- Total capacity: 540 thousand cubic meters
- Catchment area: 3.3 sq. km
- Surface area: 14 hectares

Iseki-ike (Japanese: 井関池) is an earthfill dam located in Kagawa Prefecture in Japan. The dam is used for irrigation. The catchment area of the dam is 3.3 km^{2}. The dam impounds about 14 ha of land when full and can store 540 thousand cubic meters of water. The construction of the dam was completed in 1982.

== See also ==
- List of dams in Japan
