= Jo-ike Dam =

Dam in Kagawa Prefecture, Japan

Jo-ike
- Location within Japan
- Interactive map of Jo-ike
- Official name: 城池
- Location: Kagawa Prefecture, Japan
- Coordinates: 34°13′57″N 134°6′38″E
- Opening date: 1975

Dam and spillways
- Height: 16.5 m (54 ft)
- Length: 190 m (620 ft)

Reservoir
- Total capacity: 720 thousand cubic meters
- Surface area: 19 hectares

Jo-ike (Japanese: 城池) is an earthfill dam located in Kagawa Prefecture in Japan. The dam is used for irrigation. The dam impounds about 19 ha of land when full and can store 720 thousand cubic meters of water. The construction of the dam was completed in 1975.

== See also ==
- List of dams in Japan
