= Kamiura Dam =

Dam in Ehime Prefecture, Japan

- Location within Japan
- Interactive map of Kamiura Dam
- Location: Ehime Prefecture, Japan
- Coordinates: 34°15′07″N 133°1′41″E
- Construction began: 1973
- Opening date: 1978

Dam and spillways
- Height: 31 m (102 ft)
- Length: 161 m (528 ft)

Reservoir
- Total capacity: 155 thousand cubic meters
- Catchment area: 0.5 sq. km
- Surface area: 2 hectares

Kamiura Dam is an earthfill dam located in Ehime Prefecture in Japan. The dam is used for irrigation. The catchment area of the dam is 0.5 km^{2}. The dam impounds about 2 ha of land when full and can store 155 thousand cubic meters of water. The construction of the dam was started on 1973 and completed in 1978.
