= Yanadani Dam =

Dam in Ehime Prefecture, Japan

- Location within Japan
- Location: Ehime Prefecture, Japan
- Coordinates: 33°31′47″N 132°58′29″E
- Construction began: 1984
- Opening date: 1989

Dam and spillways
- Height: 28.5 m (94 ft)
- Length: 98.5 m (323 ft)

Reservoir
- Total capacity: 270,000 m^{3} (9,500,000 cu ft)
- Catchment area: 128 km^{2} (49 sq mi)
- Surface area: 6 hectares (15 acres)

Yanadani Dam is a gravity dam located in Ehime Prefecture in Japan. The dam is used for power production. The catchment area of the dam is 128 km^{2}. The dam impounds about 6 ha of land when full and can store 270 thousand cubic meters of water. The construction of the dam was started on 1984 and completed in 1989.
