= Sanzai Dam =

Dam in Ehime Prefecture, Japan

- Location within Japan
- Location: Ehime Prefecture, Japan
- Coordinates: 33°7′03″N 132°34′59″E
- Construction began: 1972
- Opening date: 1980

Dam and spillways
- Height: 64 m (210 ft)
- Length: 205 m (673 ft)

Reservoir
- Total capacity: 6,500,000 m^{3} (230,000,000 cu ft)
- Catchment area: 29.4 km^{2} (11.4 sq mi)
- Surface area: 30 hectares (74 acres)

Sanzai Dam is a gravity dam located in Ehime Prefecture in Japan. The dam is used for flood control, irrigation and water supply. The catchment area of the dam is 29.4 km^{2}. The dam impounds about 30 ha of land when full and can store 6500 thousand cubic meters of water. The construction of the dam was started on 1972 and completed in 1980.
