= Fuchigatani-ike Dam =

Dam in Ehime Prefecture, Japan

- Location within Japan
- Interactive map of Fuchigatani-ike Dam
- Location: Ehime Prefecture, Japan
- Coordinates: 33°30′01″N 132°23′34″E
- Construction began: 1951
- Opening date: 1952

Dam and spillways
- Height: 16 m (52 ft)
- Length: 37 m (121 ft)

Reservoir
- Total capacity: 34 thousand cubic meters
- Catchment area: 0.8 sq. km
- Surface area: 1 hectares

Fuchigatani-ike Dam is an earthfill dam located in Ehime Prefecture in Japan. The dam is used for irrigation. The catchment area of the dam is 0.8 km^{2}. The dam impounds about 1 ha of land when full and can store 34 thousand cubic meters of water. The construction of the dam was started on 1951 and completed in 1952.
