= Torenji-ike Dam =

Dam in Ehime Prefecture, Japan

- Location within Japan
- Location: Ehime Prefecture, Japan
- Coordinates: 33°17′14″N 132°31′16″E
- Construction began: 1973
- Opening date: 1996

Dam and spillways
- Height: 38.1 m (125 ft)
- Length: 170 m (560 ft)

Reservoir
- Total capacity: 963,000 m^{3} (34,000,000 cu ft)
- Catchment area: 0.4 km^{2} (0.15 sq mi)
- Surface area: 7 hectares (17 acres)

Torenji-ike dam is a rockfill dam located in Ehime Prefecture in Japan. The dam is used for irrigation. The catchment area of the dam is 0.4 km^{2}. The dam impounds about 7 ha of land when full and can store 963 thousand cubic meters of water. The construction of the dam was started on 1973 and completed in 1996.
