= Koda-ike Dam =

Dam in Ehime Prefecture, Japan

Koda-ike
- Location within Japan
- Location: Ehime Prefecture, Japan
- Coordinates: 34°1′08″N 132°50′28″E
- Opening date: 1953

Dam and spillways
- Height: 22.3 m (73 ft)
- Length: 76 m (249 ft)

Reservoir
- Total capacity: 120 thousand cubic meters
- Catchment area: 0.9 sq. km
- Surface area: 1 hectares

Koda-ike is an earthfill dam located in Ehime Prefecture in Japan. The dam is used for irrigation. The catchment area of the dam is 0.9 km^{2}. The dam impounds about 1 ha of land when full and can store 120 thousand cubic meters of water. The construction of the dam was completed in 1953.
