= Sangoro-ike Dam =

Dam in Kagawa Prefecture, Japan

Sangoro-ike
- Location within Japan
- Official name: 三五郎池
- Location: Kagawa Prefecture, Japan
- Coordinates: 34°29′45″N 134°19′27″E
- Construction began: 1916
- Opening date: 1924

Dam and spillways
- Height: 18 m (59 ft)
- Length: 150 m (490 ft)

Reservoir
- Total capacity: 85,000 m^{3} (3,000,000 cu ft)
- Catchment area: 0.9 km^{2} (0.35 sq mi)
- Surface area: 1 hectare (2.5 acres)

Sangoro-ike (Japanese: 三五郎池) is an earthfill dam located in Kagawa Prefecture in Japan. The dam is used for irrigation and water supply. The catchment area of the dam is 0.9 km^{2}. The dam impounds about 1 ha of land when full and can store 85 thousand cubic meters of water. The construction of the dam was started on 1916 and completed in 1924.

== See also ==
- List of dams in Japan
