= Tsuboimo-ike Dam =

Dam in Ehime Prefecture, Japan

- Location within Japan
- Location: Ehime Prefecture, Japan
- Coordinates: 33°23′13″N 132°44′24″E
- Opening date: 1942

Dam and spillways
- Height: 15 m (49 ft)
- Length: 75 m (246 ft)

Reservoir
- Total capacity: 6,000 m^{3} (210,000 cu ft)
- Surface area: 1 hectare (2.5 acres)

Tsuboimo-ike Dam is an earthfill dam located in Ehime Prefecture in Japan. The dam is used for irrigation. The dam impounds about 1 ha of land when full and can store 6 thousand cubic meters of water. The construction of the dam was completed in 1942.
