= Nakayamagawa Gyaku Tyouseiti Dam =

Dam in Ehime Prefecture, Japan

- Location within Japan
- Location: Ehime Prefecture, Japan
- Coordinates: 33°49′22″N 132°58′51″E
- Opening date: 1963

Dam and spillways
- Height: 20.8 m (68 ft)

Reservoir
- Total capacity: 177 thousand cubic meters
- Surface area: 3.18 hectares

Nakayamagawa Gyaku Tyouseiti Dam is a gravity dam located in Ehime Prefecture in Japan. The dam is used for power production. The catchment area of the dam is km^{2}. The dam impounds about 3.18 ha of land when full and can store 177 thousand cubic meters of water. The construction of the dam was completed in 1963.
