= Jinnai-kami-ike Dam =

Dam in Kagawa Prefecture, Japan

Jinnai-kami-ike
- Location within Japan
- Interactive map of Jinnai-kami-ike
- Official name: 神内上池
- Location: Kagawa Prefecture, Japan
- Coordinates: 34°13′30″N 134°3′45″E
- Opening date: 1916

Dam and spillways
- Height: 29.7 m (97 ft)
- Length: 130 m (430 ft)

Reservoir
- Total capacity: 750 thousand cubic meters
- Surface area: 9 hectares

Jinnai-kami-ike (Japanese: 神内上池) is an earthfill dam located in Kagawa Prefecture in Japan. The dam is used for irrigation. The dam impounds about 9 ha of land when full and can store 750 thousand cubic meters of water. The construction of the dam was completed in 1916.

== See also ==
- List of dams in Japan
