= Tawarabara-ike Dam =

Dam in Ehime Prefecture, Japan

- Location within Japan
- Location: Ehime Prefecture, Japan
- Coordinates: 33°58′52″N 132°48′57″E
- Construction began: 1937
- Opening date: 1942

Dam and spillways
- Height: 25.5 m (84 ft)
- Length: 172 m (564 ft)

Reservoir
- Total capacity: 1,000,000 m^{3} (35,000,000 cu ft)
- Catchment area: 0.5 km^{2} (0.19 sq mi)
- Surface area: 12 hectares (30 acres)

Tawarabara-ike Dam is an earthfill dam located in Ehime Prefecture in Japan. The dam is used for irrigation. The catchment area of the dam is 0.5 km^{2}. The dam impounds about 12 ha of land when full and can store 1000 thousand cubic meters of water. The construction of the dam was started on 1937 and completed in 1942.
