= Sekiji-ike Dam =

Dam in Ehime Prefecture, Japan

Sekiji-ike
- Location within Japan
- Location: Ehime Prefecture, Japan
- Coordinates: 33°25′59″N 132°31′17″E
- Construction began: 1952
- Opening date: 1961

Dam and spillways
- Height: 22.5 m (74 ft)
- Length: 155 m (509 ft)

Reservoir
- Total capacity: 1,000,000 m^{3} (35,000,000 cu ft)
- Catchment area: 3.2 km^{2} (1.2 sq mi)
- Surface area: 10 hectares (25 acres)

Sekiji-ike is an earthfill dam located in Ehime Prefecture in Japan. The dam is used for irrigation. The catchment area of the dam is 3.2 km^{2}. The dam impounds about 10 ha of land when full and can store 1000 thousand cubic meters of water. The construction of the dam was started on 1952 and completed in 1961.
