= Kagawa Yosui Choseichi Dam =

Dam in Kagawa Prefecture, Japan

Kagawa Yosui Choseichi
- Location within Japan
- Interactive map of Kagawa Yosui Choseichi
- Official name: 香川用水調整池
- Location: Kagawa Prefecture, Japan
- Coordinates: 34°8′04″N 133°46′13″E
- Construction began: 1999
- Opening date: 2008

Dam and spillways
- Height: 25 m (82 ft)
- Length: 240 m (790 ft)

Reservoir
- Total capacity: 3070 thousand cubic meters
- Catchment area: 0.6 sq. km
- Surface area: 24 hectares

Kagawa Yosui Choseichi (Japanese: 香川用水調整池) is an earthfill dam located in Kagawa Prefecture in Japan. The dam is used for water supply. The catchment area of the dam is 0.6 km^{2}. The dam impounds about 24 ha of land when full and can store 3070 thousand cubic meters of water. The construction of the dam was started on 1999 and completed in 2008.

== See also ==
- List of dams in Japan
