= Mokkoku-ike Dam =

Dam in Kagawa Prefecture, Japan

Mokkoku-ike (Re)
- Location within Japan
- Official name: 木槲池（再）
- Location: Kagawa Prefecture, Japan
- Coordinates: 34°8′41″N 133°52′29″E
- Construction began: 1985
- Opening date: 1991

Dam and spillways
- Height: 27.1 m (89 ft)
- Length: 298 m (978 ft)

Reservoir
- Total capacity: 449 thousand cubic meters
- Catchment area: 12.2 sq. km
- Surface area: 5 hectares

Mokkoku-ike (Re) (Japanese: 木槲池（再）) is an earthfill dam located in Kagawa Prefecture in Japan. The dam is used for irrigation. The catchment area of the dam is 12.2 km^{2}. The dam impounds about 5 ha of land when full and can store 449 thousand cubic meters of water. The construction of the dam was started on 1985 and completed in 1991.

== See also ==
- List of dams in Japan
