= Kanogawa Dam =

Dam in Ehime Prefecture, Japan

Kanogawa Dam (Pre)
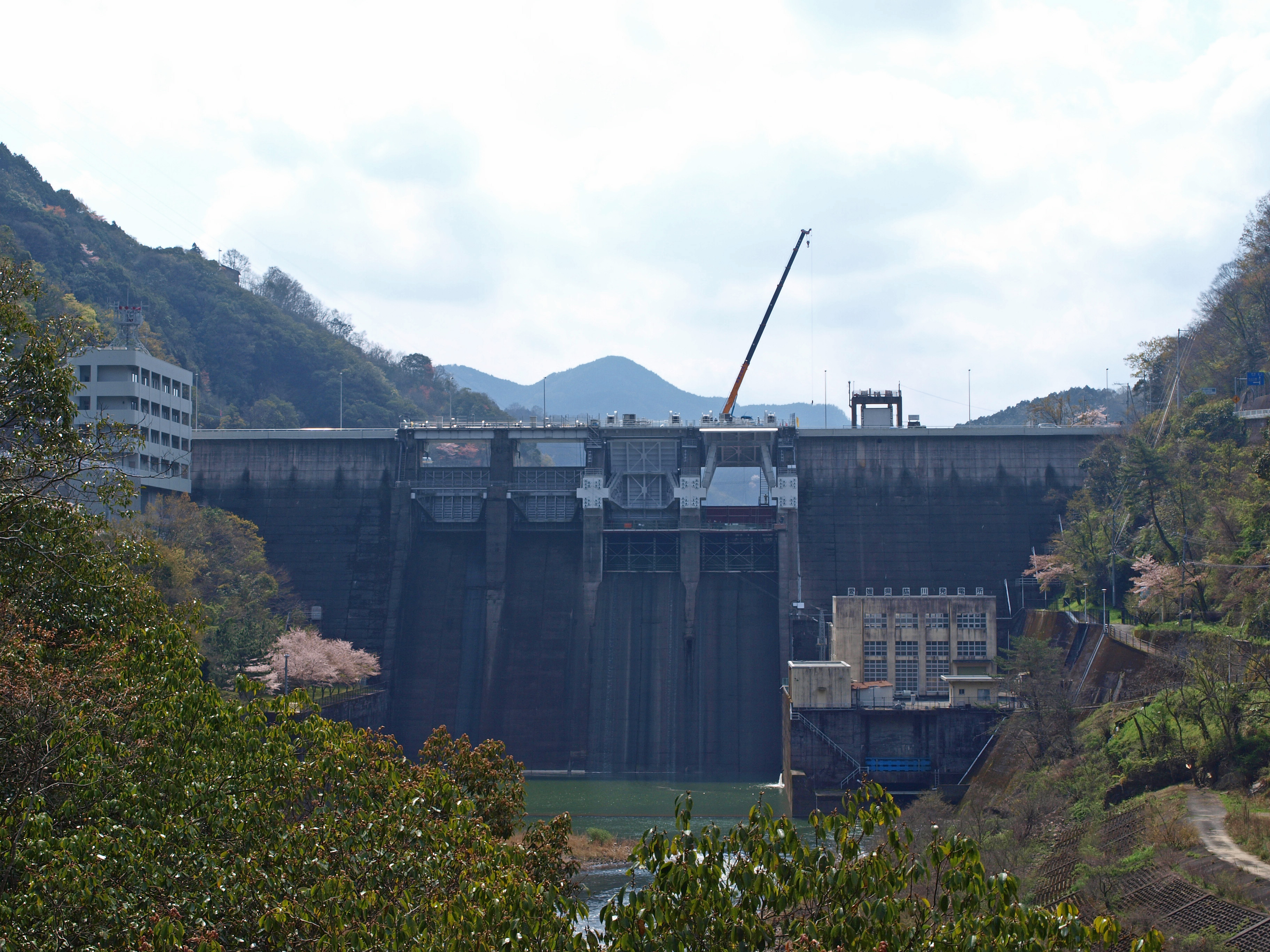

- Location within Japan
- Interactive map of Kanogawa Dam (Pre)
- Location: Ehime Prefecture, Japan
- Coordinates: 33°27′01″N 132°41′07″E
- Construction began: 1953
- Opening date: 1958

Dam and spillways
- Height: 61 m (200 ft)
- Length: 167.9 m (551 ft)

Reservoir
- Total capacity: 48200 thousand cubic meters
- Catchment area: 513 sq. km
- Surface area: 232 hectares

Kanogawa Dam (Pre) is a gravity dam located in Ehime Prefecture in Japan. The dam is used for flood control and power production. The catchment area of the dam is 513 km^{2}. The dam impounds about 232 ha of land when full and can store 48200 thousand cubic meters of water. The construction of the dam was started on 1953 and completed in 1958. It was repaired in 2018.
