= Sakase-ike Dam (Kagawa) =

Dam in Kagawa Prefecture, Japan

Sakase-ike
- Location within Japan
- Official name: 逆瀬池
- Location: Kagawa Prefecture, Japan
- Coordinates: 34°4′56″N 133°44′26″E
- Opening date: 1962

Dam and spillways
- Height: 22.2 m (73 ft)
- Length: 78 m (256 ft)

Reservoir
- Total capacity: 536,000 m^{3} (18,900,000 cu ft)
- Catchment area: 2 km^{2} (0.77 sq mi)
- Surface area: 6 hectares (15 acres)

Sakase-ike (Japanese: 逆瀬池) is an earthfill dam located in Kagawa Prefecture in Japan. The dam is used for irrigation. The catchment area of the dam is 2 km^{2}. The dam impounds about 6 ha of land when full and can store 536 thousand cubic meters of water. The construction of the dam was completed in 1962.

== See also ==
- List of dams in Japan
