= Hiji River =

River in Shikoku, Japan

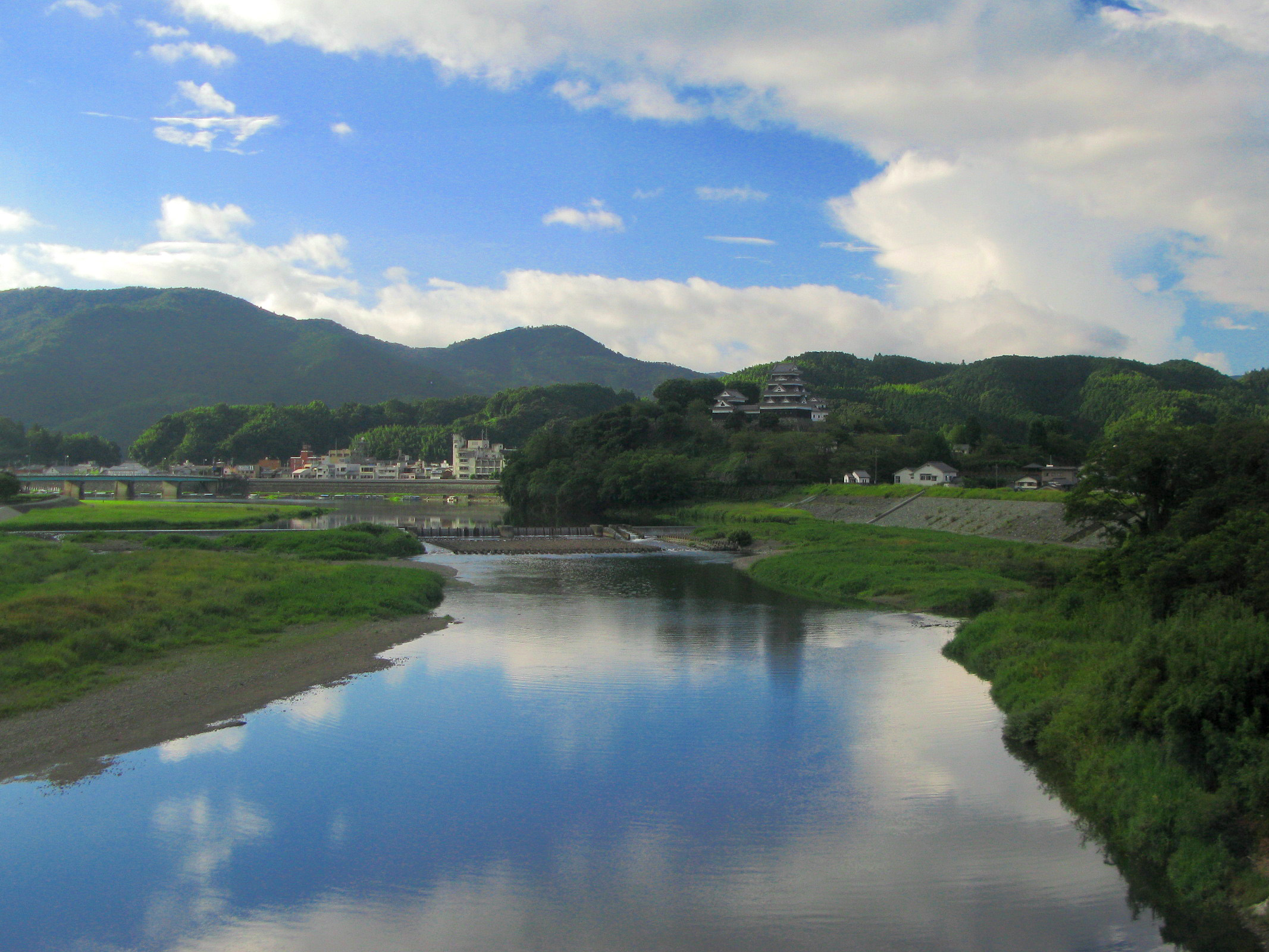

- Location within Japan
- Native name: 肱川 (Japanese)

Location
- Country: Japan
- Prefectures: Ehime

Physical characteristics
- Source
  - location: Mount Tosaka
  - coordinates: 33°26′55″N 132°30′28″E
- Mouth
  - location: Seto Inland Sea
  - coordinates: 33°36′43″N 132°28′36″E
  - elevation: 0 m (0 ft)
- Length: 103 km (64 mi)
- Basin size: 1,210 km^{2} (470 sq mi)

Basin features
- Population: 100100

The Hiji River (肱川, Hijikawa) is a Class A river on the island of Shikoku, Japan.

The Hiji River flows for 103 kilometers (64 mi). It has a watershed area of 1,210 square kilometers (470 sq mi), with a population of about 100,100 people.
