= Shin-ike Dam (Kagawa) =

Dam in Kagawa Prefecture, Japan

Shin-ike
- Location within Japan
- Official name: 新池
- Location: Kagawa Prefecture, Japan
- Coordinates: 34°14′28″N 134°2′34″E
- Construction began: 1968
- Opening date: 1970

Dam and spillways
- Height: 15.1 m (50 ft)
- Length: 710 m (2,330 ft)

Reservoir
- Total capacity: 1,200,000 m^{3} (42,000,000 cu ft)
- Catchment area: 1.5 km^{2} (0.58 sq mi)
- Surface area: 27 hectares (67 acres)

Shin-ike (Japanese: 新池) is an earthfill dam located in Kagawa Prefecture in Japan. The dam is used for irrigation. The catchment area of the dam is 1.5 km^{2}. The dam impounds about 27 ha of land when full and can store 1200 thousand cubic meters of water. The construction of the dam was started on 1968 and completed in 1970.

== See also ==
- List of dams in Japan
