= Ohtani-ike Dam (Kagawa) =

Dam in Kagawa Prefecture, Japan

- Location within Japan
- Official name: 大谷池
- Location: Kagawa Prefecture, Japan
- Coordinates: 34°4′33″N 133°41′08″E
- Opening date: 1959

Dam and spillways
- Height: 16.9 m (55 ft)
- Length: 304 m (997 ft)

Reservoir
- Total capacity: 1,000,000 m^{3} (35,000,000 cu ft)
- Surface area: 14 hectares (35 acres)

Ohtani-ike Dam (Japanese: 大谷池) is an earthfill dam located in Kagawa Prefecture in Japan. The dam is used for irrigation. The dam impounds about 14 ha of land when full and can store 1000 thousand cubic meters of water. The construction of the dam was completed in 1959.

== See also ==
- List of dams in Japan
