= Maeyama Dam =

Dam in Kagawa Prefecture, Japan

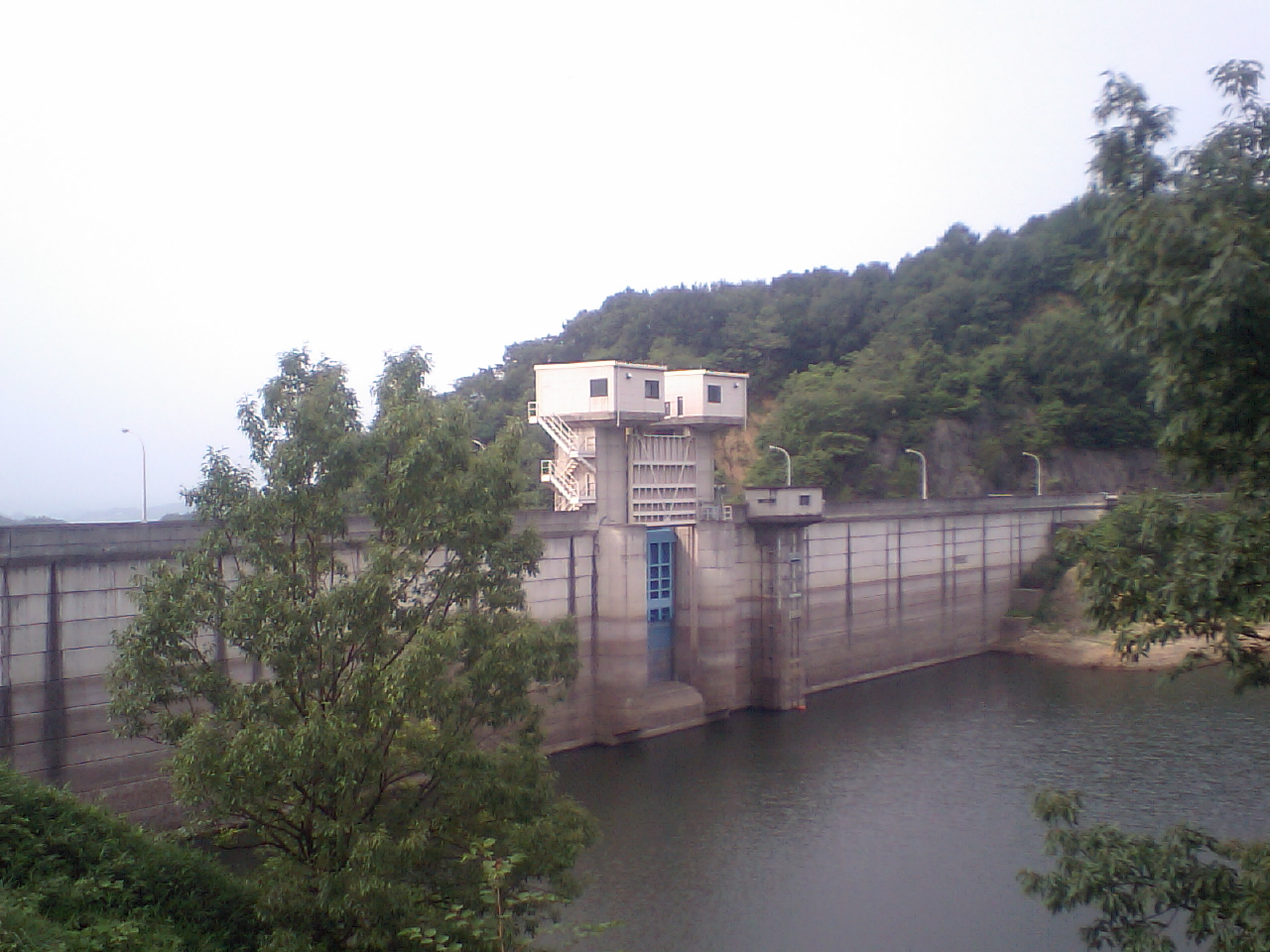
- Interactive map of Maeyama Dam
- Location: Kagawa Prefecture, Japan
- Coordinates: 34°13′29″N 134°10′20″E

Maeyama Dam is a dam located in the foothills of Sanuki City, Kagawa Prefecture.

== Overview ==
The Maeyama Dam is a part of the Kamobu river, which is one of two rivers that starts in the Sanuki Mountains, drainage integrated development project. It was built for flood control and to maintain normal water flow as well as provide water for irrigation systems. It's a 38.8 meter high multipurpose gravity dam that Kagawa prefecture is responsible for.

With repeated flooding of the Kamobu River, in 1966 to protect the water supply for Shido and Nagao cities (now both a part of Sanuki City) a Kamobu River integrated project was planned. Starting in 1968, the inspection, organization, and purchase of the location started. In 1972, construction of the dam began. In March 1975, flood tests began.

In addition to the lake shore development as Maeyama park and campground, the foothill's Kubo Hiroshi and Nagao Temples are tied to the 88 temples of Shikoku pilgrimage, so there are 88 enshrined Jizō statues to symbolize the journey. On the left bank there is the Nagao roadside rest area, Pilgrimage Exchange Salon, and the Sanuki City Elementary school, which was relocated due to dam construction. Before relocation, the school was a two story wooden building at the bottom of the dam. After relocation, a new 3-story reinforced concrete building was built with a swimming pool on the roof.
