= Shin-ike Dam (Ehime) =

Dam in Ehime Prefecture, Japan

- Location within Japan
- Location: Ehime Prefecture, Japan
- Coordinates: 34°2′08″N 132°54′09″E
- Opening date: 1877

Dam and spillways
- Height: 20.1 m (66 ft)
- Length: 50.5 m (166 ft)

Reservoir
- Total capacity: 31,000 m^{3} (1,100,000 cu ft)
- Catchment area: sq. km
- Surface area: 1 hectare (2.5 acres)

Shin-ike Dam is an earthfill dam located in Ehime Prefecture in Japan. The dam is used for irrigation. The catchment area of the dam is km^{2}. The dam impounds about 1 ha of land when full and can store 31 thousand cubic meters of water. The construction of the dam was completed in 1877.
