= Ohtani-ike Dam (Ehime) =

Dam in Ehime Prefecture, Japan

- Location within Japan
- Location: Ehime Prefecture, Japan
- Coordinates: 33°45′18″N 132°44′35″E
- Opening date: 1944

Dam and spillways
- Height: 37 m (121 ft)
- Length: 190 m (620 ft)

Reservoir
- Total capacity: 1,759,000 m^{3} (62,100,000 cu ft)
- Catchment area: 4.6 km^{2} (1.8 sq mi)
- Surface area: 2 hectares (4.9 acres)

Ohtani-ike Dam is an earthfill dam located in Ehime Prefecture in Japan. The dam is used for irrigation. The catchment area of the dam is 4.6 km^{2}. The dam impounds about 2 ha of land when full and can store 1759 thousand cubic meters of water. The construction of the dam was completed in 1944.
