= List of dams in Hiroshima Prefecture =

The following is a list of dams in Hiroshima Prefecture, Japan.

== List ==
Name	Location	Opened	Height (metres)	Image
Amegi-ike Dam		1987	15	
Aratani-ike Dam		1917	17.5	
Ariekami-ike Dam		1899	16.7	
Daiwa-ike Dam		2004	15	
Fujio Dam		1974	32.5	
Fukado Dam		1968	15	
Fukutomi Dam		2008	58	
Haizuka Dam		2006	50	
Haji Dam		1974	50	
Hattabara Dam		1997	84.9	
Hattori-ohike Dam		1997	15	
Hisayamada Dam			22.5	
Honjo Dam			25.4	
Hontao-ike Dam		1962	18	
Ichihata Tameike Dam		1969	18.5	
Iinoyama Dam		1932	18.5	
Itaki Dam		1983	33	
Kajike Dam		2008	49	
Kanda-ohike Dam		1989	22.3	
Kanzaki-ohike Dam		1950	17.9	
Kawaidani Choseichi Dam		1971	16.5	
Kawanoki Dam		1984	26.8	
Kōbo Dam		1949	69.4	
Kono-ike Dam		1953	16	
Korinji-ike Dam		1999	19.9	
Koroku Dam		1965	22.5	
Kumano Dam		1925	29.1	
Kunikane-ike Dam		1953	16.4	
Kureji-ohike Dam		1958	15	
Kurose Dam		1988	30	
Kutsugahara Dam		1941	19.5	
Kyomaru Dam		1996	25.5	
Masudamari Dam		1938	19.2	
Matsunaga Tameike Dam		1968	25	
Megurigami Tameike Dam		1959	18.6	
Metani Dam		1986	49.7	
Migo Dam		2003	28.2	
Mikawa Dam		1960	53	
Mitsugi Dam		1988	53.1	
Mukunasi Dam			39.5	
Myojin Dam		1976	88.5	
Nabara Dam		1976	85.5	
Nagatani-ohike Dam		1949	20	
Nakano Dam		1975	44	
Naosuke Tameike Dam		1956	16	
Nashinari-ike Dam		1997	15	
Nika Dam		2011	47	
Nikyu Dam			32	
Nomagawa Dam		2012	31.5	
Norokawa Dam		1975	44.8	
Nukui Dam		2001	156	
Odayama-ike Dam		1961	15.6	
Ōdomari Dam		1935	74	
Ohgidani-ike Dam		1953	17.5	
Ohkame-ike Dam		1987	15	
Okubo Dam		1974	26	
Ohtani-ike Dam		1990	27.3	
Ohyama Oku-Ike Dam		1943	17.1	
Okuyama Dam		2009	32.7	
Ozegawa Dam		1964	49	
Ryusenji Dam		1965	35	
Sandanda-ike Dam		1975	15	
Senjogahara Dam		1997	19	
Senyo Dam		1976	30	
Senzoku-ike No.2 Dam		1965	18.2	
Shibakikawa Dam		1954	15.5	
Shibayama-Ike Dam		1919	15.5	
Shikawa Dam		2004	58.9	
Shobara Dam		2015	42	
Showa-ike Dam		1944	18.1	
Suzu-ike Dam		1971	19	
Tabusa Dam				
Taishakugawa Dam		1924	62.1	
Tarudoko Dam		1957	42	
Tateiwa Dam		1939	67.4	
Uga Dam		1959	31.5	
Uneyama-ohike Dam		1947	16.9	
Uokiri Dam		1981	79.8	
Watanose Dam		1956	34.5	
Yamadagawa Dam		2005	32.1	
Yasaka Dam		1991	120	
Yokadani Dam		1963	21	

== See also ==
- Media related to Dams in Hiroshima prefecture at Wikimedia Commons
