= Nakano Dam =

Nakano Dam may refer to:

- Nakano Dam (Hokkaido)
- Nakano Dam (Hiroshima)
