= Showa-ike Dam =

Showa-ike Dam may refer to the following dams in Japan:

- Showa-ike Dam (Hiroshima, Japan), built 1944
- Showa-ike Dam (Hyogo, Japan), built 1944
- Showa-ike Dam (Kyoto, Japan), built 1930
- Showa-ike Dam (Yamaguchi, Japan), built 1939–1945
