= Tateiwa Dam =

Tateiwa Dam may refer to:

- Tateiwa Dam (Ehime)
- Tateiwa Dam (Hiroshima)
