= Oze River =

Oze River 小瀬川
- Oze River in 2007

- Location within Japan

Location
- Country: Japan
- State: Honshu
- Region: Hiroshima, Yamaguchi

Physical characteristics
- Source: Onigajoyama (鬼ヶ城山)
  - location: Hatsukaichi, Hiroshima
  - elevation: 1,031 m (3,383 ft)
- Mouth: Seto Inland Sea
  - location: Waki, Yamaguchi; Ōtake, Hiroshima
  - coordinates: 34°12′39″N 132°14′47″E
- Length: 59 km (37 mi)
- Basin size: 340 km^{2} (130 sq mi)

The Oze River (Japanese: 小瀬川(おぜがわ), Hepburn: ozegawa) is a Class A river in Hiroshima Prefecture and Yamaguchi Prefecture, Japan. The river forms part of the border between the two prefectures, which used to be the border between former Suō Province and Aki Province. It is also known as Kono River (木野川).

== See also ==
- Ozegawa Dam
- Yasaka Dam
