= Tarudoko Dam =

Dam in Hiroshima Prefecture, Japan

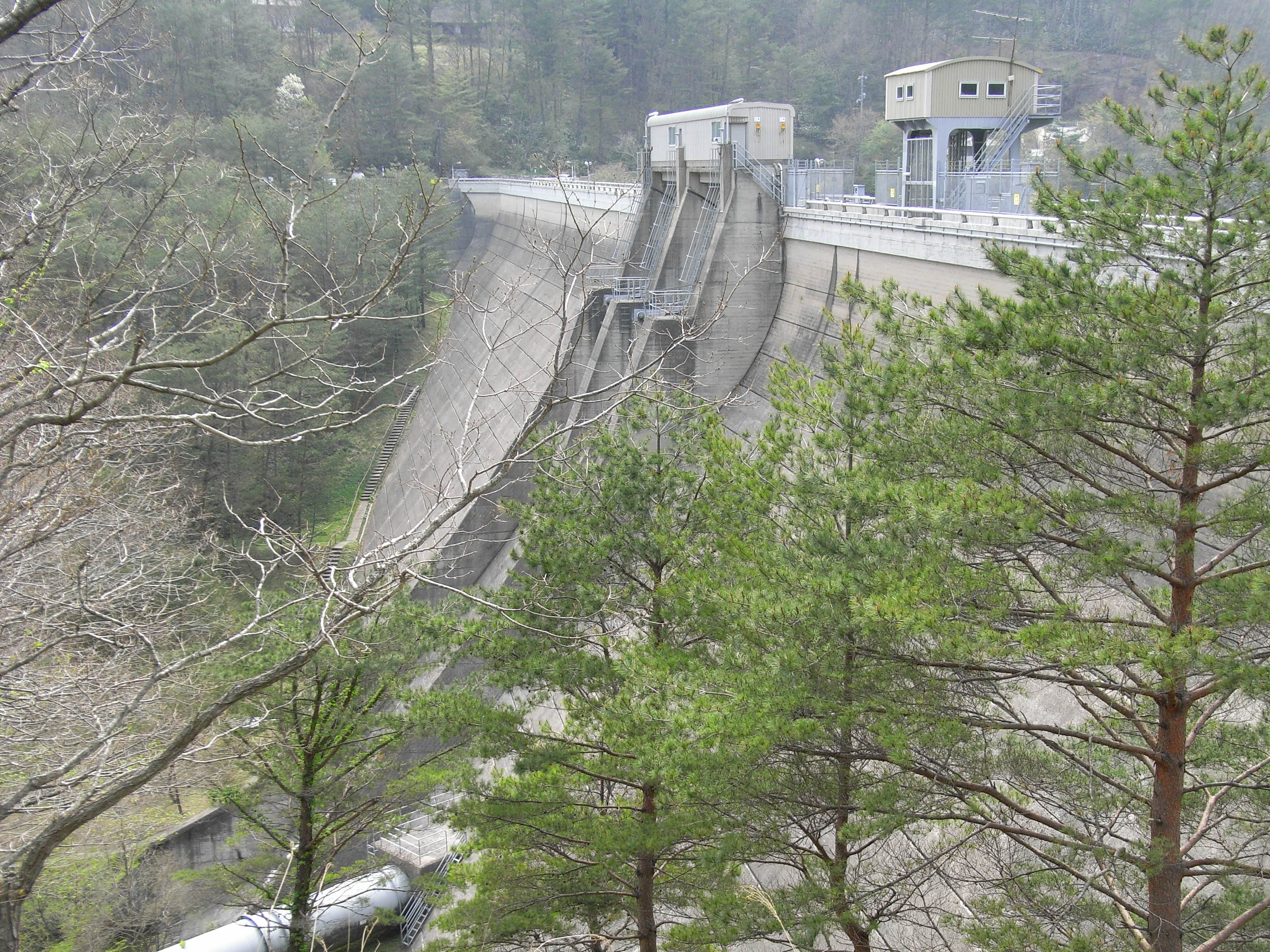
- Location: Hiroshima Prefecture, Japan.
- Coordinates: 34°39′05″N 132°10′09″E
- Opening date: 1957

Dam and spillways
- Impounds: Shibaki River
- Height: 42 m
- Length: 261.2 m

Reservoir
- Total capacity: 20,600,000 m^{3}
- Catchment area: 39.5 km^{2}
- Surface area: 180 hectares

The Tarutoko Dam (Japanese: 樽床ダム) is a gravity dam located in Hiroshima Prefecture, Japan. Primarily used for power generation, the dam has a catchment area of 39.5 km^{2}. When full, it impounds about 180 ha of land and has a storage capacity of 20,600 thousand cubic meters of water. Construction was completed in 1957.
