= Nomagawa Dam =

Dam in Hiroshima Prefecture, Japan

- Location within Japan
- Location: Hiroshima Prefecture, Japan
- Coordinates: 34°31′45″N 133°4′08″E
- Construction began: 1988
- Opening date: 2012

Dam and spillways
- Height: 31.5 m (103 ft)
- Length: 112.6 m (369 ft)

Reservoir
- Total capacity: 560,000 m^{3} (20,000,000 cu ft)
- Catchment area: 4.4 km^{2} (1.7 sq mi)
- Surface area: 6 hectares (15 acres)

Nomagawa Dam (Japanese: 野間川ダム) is a gravity dam located in Hiroshima Prefecture in Japan. The dam is used for flood control and water supply. The catchment area of the dam is 4.4 km^{2}. The dam impounds about 6 ha of land when full and can store 560 thousand cubic meters of water. The construction of the dam was started on 1988 and completed in 2012.
