= Kureji-ohike Dam =

Dam in Hiroshima Prefecture, Japan

- Location within Japan
- Location: Hiroshima Prefecture, Japan
- Coordinates: 34°18′56″N 132°36′04″E
- Construction began: 1955
- Opening date: 1958

Dam and spillways
- Height: 15 m (49 ft)
- Length: 100 m (330 ft)

Reservoir
- Total capacity: 63 thousand cubic meters
- Catchment area: 0.7 sq. km
- Surface area: 2 hectares

Kureji-ohike Dam (Japanese: 呉地大池) is a gravity dam located in Hiroshima Prefecture in Japan. The dam is used for irrigation. The catchment area of the dam is 0.7 km^{2}. The dam impounds about 2 ha of land when full and can store 63 thousand cubic meters of water. The construction of the dam was started on 1955 and completed in 1958.
