= Fujio Dam =

Dam in Hiroshima Prefecture, Japan

- Location within Japan
- Interactive map of Fujio Dam
- Location: Hiroshima Prefecture, Japan
- Coordinates: 34°38′26″N 133°17′12″E
- Opening date: 1974

Dam and spillways
- Height: 32.5 m (107 ft)
- Length: 105 m (344 ft)

Reservoir
- Total capacity: 870 thousand cubic meters
- Catchment area: 10 sq. km
- Surface area: 9 hectares

Fujio Dam (Japanese: 藤尾ダム) is a rockfill dam located in Hiroshima Prefecture in Japan. The dam is used for flood control and irrigation. The catchment area of the dam is 10 km^{2}. The dam impounds about 9 ha of land when full and can store 870 thousand cubic meters of water. The construction of the dam was completed in 1974.
