= Nashinari-ike Dam =

Dam in Hiroshima Prefecture, Japan

- Location within Japan
- Location: Hiroshima Prefecture, Japan
- Coordinates: 34°29′39″N 133°11′02″E
- Construction began: 1994
- Opening date: 1997

Dam and spillways
- Height: 15 m (49 ft)
- Length: 47.5 m (156 ft)

Reservoir
- Total capacity: 111 thousand cubic meters
- Catchment area: 1 sq. km
- Surface area: 2 hectares

Nashinari-ike Dam (Japanese: 梨成池) is an earthfill dam located in Hiroshima Prefecture in Japan. The dam is used for irrigation. The catchment area of the dam is 1 km^{2}. The dam impounds about 2 ha of land when full and can store 111 thousand cubic meters of water. The construction of the dam was started on 1994 and completed in 1997.
