= Ozegawa Dam =

Dam in Hiroshima Prefecture, Japan

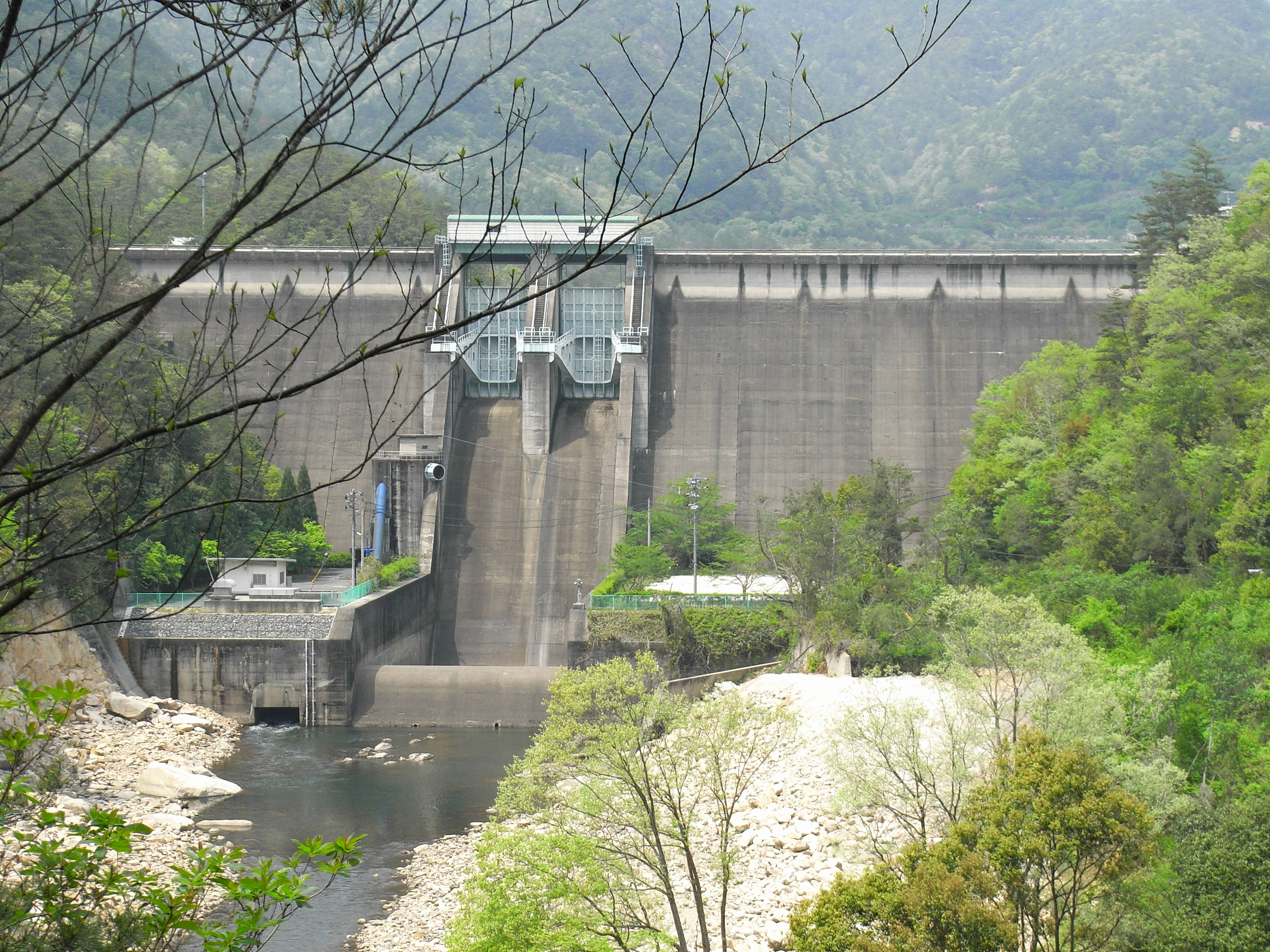
- Location: Hiroshima Prefecture, Japan.
- Coordinates: 34°18′29.0″N 132°07′24.2″E
- Construction began: 1958
- Opening date: 1964

Dam and spillways
- Impounds: Oze River
- Height: 49 m
- Length: 158 m

Reservoir
- Total capacity: 11,400,000 m^{3}
- Catchment area: 135.0 km^{2}
- Surface area: 90 hectares

Ozegawa Dam is a dam in Hiroshima Prefecture, Japan.
