= Ohtani-ike Dam (Hiroshima) =

Dam in Hiroshima Prefecture, Japan

- Location within Japan
- Location: Hiroshima Prefecture, Japan
- Coordinates: 34°36′31″N 133°19′35″E
- Opening date: 1990

Dam and spillways
- Height: 27.3 m (90 ft)
- Length: 103 m (338 ft)

Reservoir
- Total capacity: 891,000 m^{3} (31,500,000 cu ft)
- Catchment area: 4.5 km^{2} (1.7 sq mi)
- Surface area: 8 hectares (20 acres)

Ohtani-ike Dam (Japanese: 大谷池) is an earthfill dam located in Hiroshima Prefecture in Japan. The dam is used for irrigation. The catchment area of the dam is 4.5 km^{2}. The dam impounds about 8 ha of land when full and can store 891 thousand cubic meters of water. The construction of the dam was completed in 1990.
