= Shibakikawa Dam =

Dam in Hiroshima Prefecture, Japan

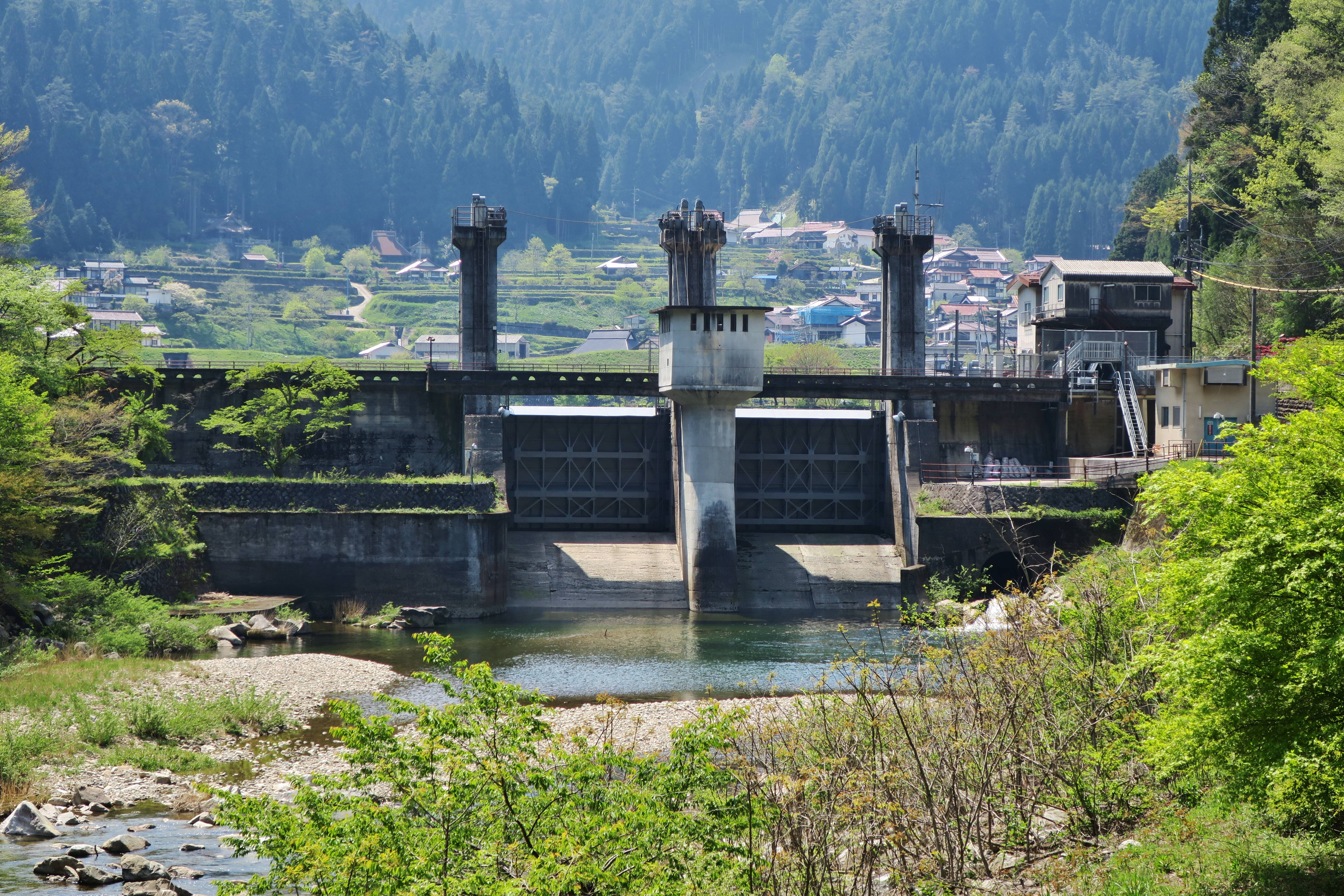

- Location within Japan
- Location: Hiroshima Prefecture, Japan
- Coordinates: 34°35′46″N 132°12′55″E
- Opening date: 1954

Dam and spillways
- Height: 15.5 m (51 ft)
- Length: 104.9 m (344 ft)

Reservoir
- Total capacity: 231,000 m^{3} (8,200,000 cu ft)
- Catchment area: 98.5 km^{2} (38.0 sq mi)
- Surface area: 7 hectares (17 acres)

Shibakikawa Dam (Japanese: 柴木川ダム) is a gravity dam located in Hiroshima Prefecture in Japan. The dam is used for power production. The catchment area of the dam is 98.5 km^{2}. The dam impounds about 7 ha of land when full and can store 231 thousand cubic meters of water. The construction of the dam was completed in 1954.
