= Kawanoki Dam =

Dam in Hiroshima Prefecture, Japan

- Location within Japan
- Location: Hiroshima Prefecture, Japan
- Coordinates: 34°22′40″N 132°39′32″E
- Construction began: 1974
- Opening date: 1984

Dam and spillways
- Height: 26.8 m (88 ft)
- Length: 220 m (720 ft)

Reservoir
- Total capacity: 210 thousand cubic meters
- Catchment area: sq. km
- Surface area: 4 hectares

Kawanoki Dam (Japanese: 椛の木ダム) is an earthfill dam located in Hiroshima Prefecture in Japan. The dam is used for irrigation. The dam impounds about 4 ha of land when full and can store 210 thousand cubic meters of water. The construction of the dam was started on 1974 and completed in 1984.
