= Sandanda-ike Dam =

Dam in Hiroshima Prefecture, Japan

- Location within Japan
- Location: Hiroshima Prefecture, Japan
- Coordinates: 34°35′06″N 133°24′09″E
- Opening date: 1975

Dam and spillways
- Height: 15 m (49 ft)
- Length: 107 m (351 ft)

Reservoir
- Total capacity: 117,000 m^{3} (4,100,000 cu ft)
- Catchment area: 1.6 km^{2} (0.62 sq mi)
- Surface area: 3 hectares (7.4 acres)

Sandanda-ike Dam (Japanese: 三反田池) is an earthfill dam located in Hiroshima Prefecture in Japan. The dam is used for irrigation. The catchment area of the dam is 1.6 km^{2}. The dam impounds about 3 ha of land when full and can store 117 thousand cubic meters of water. The construction of the dam was completed in 1975.
