= Yasaka Dam =

Dam in Hiroshima Prefecture, Japan

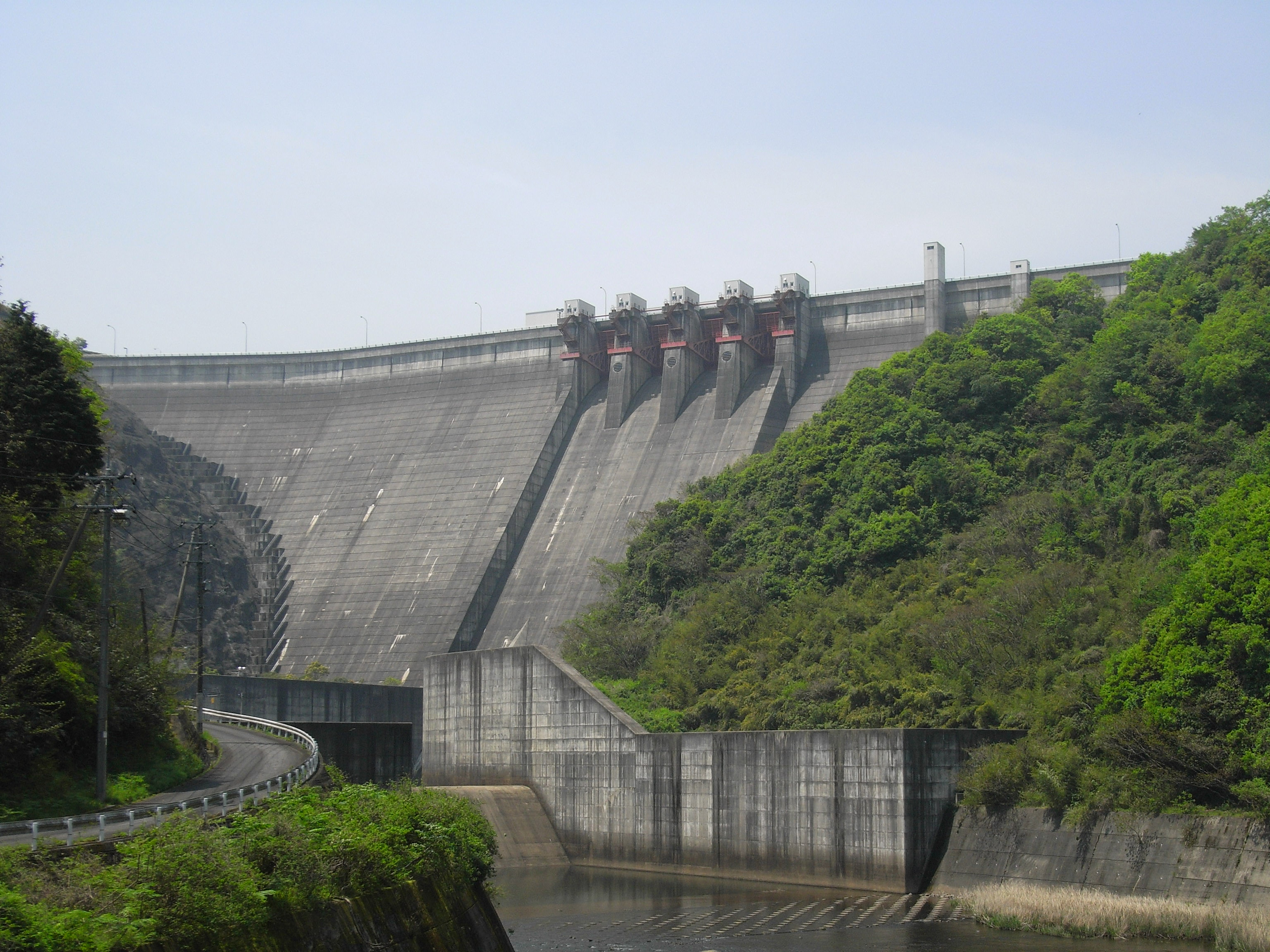
- Interactive map of Yasaka Dam
- Location: Hiroshima Prefecture, Japan.
- Coordinates: 34°14′00″N 132°09′45″E
- Construction began: 1971
- Opening date: 1991

Dam and spillways
- Impounds: Oze River
- Height: 120 m
- Length: 540 m

Reservoir
- Total capacity: 112,000,000 m^{3}
- Catchment area: 301 km^{2}
- Surface area: 360 hectares

Yasaka Dam is a dam in the Hiroshima Prefecture of Japan.
