= Ohkame-ike Dam =

Dam in Hiroshima Prefecture, Japan

- Location within Japan
- Location: Hiroshima Prefecture, Japan
- Coordinates: 34°46′09″N 132°51′46″E
- Construction began: 1983
- Opening date: 1987

Dam and spillways
- Height: 15 m (49 ft)
- Length: 47 m (154 ft)

Reservoir
- Total capacity: 41,000 m^{3} (1,400,000 cu ft)
- Catchment area: 0.6 km^{2} (0.23 sq mi)
- Surface area: 1 hectare (2.5 acres)

Ohkame-ike Dam (Japanese: 大亀池) is an earthfill dam located in Hiroshima Prefecture in Japan. The dam is used for irrigation. The catchment area of the dam is 0.6 km^{2}. The dam impounds about 1 ha of land when full and can store 41 thousand cubic meters of water. The construction of the dam was started on 1983 and completed in 1987.
