= Nagatani-ohike Dam =

Dam in Hiroshima Prefecture, Japan

- Location within Japan
- Location: Hiroshima Prefecture, Japan
- Coordinates: 34°43′20″N 132°55′48″E
- Opening date: 1949

Dam and spillways
- Height: 20 m (66 ft)
- Length: 70 m (230 ft)

Reservoir
- Total capacity: 41 thousand cubic meters
- Catchment area: 0.3 sq. km
- Surface area: 1 hectares

Nagatani-ohike Dam (Japanese: 長田大池) is an earthfill dam located in Hiroshima Prefecture in Japan. The dam is used for irrigation. The catchment area of the dam is 0.3 km^{2}. The dam impounds about 1 ha of land when full and can store 41 thousand cubic meters of water. The construction of the dam was completed in 1949.
