= Uokiri Dam =

Dam in Hiroshima Prefecture, Japan

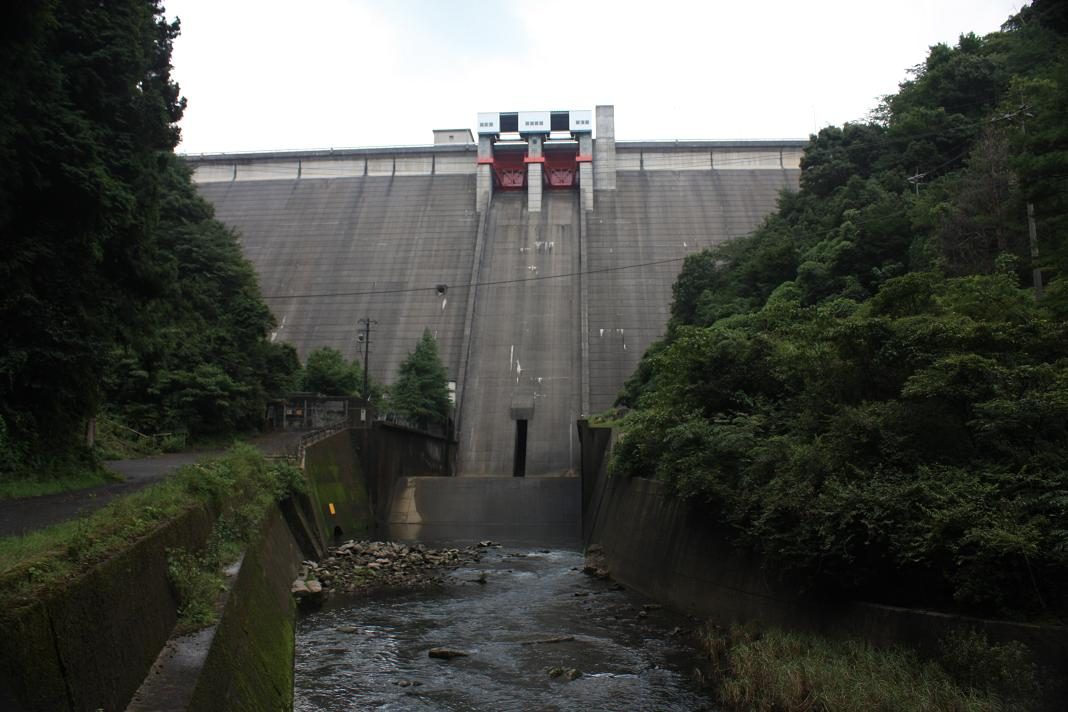

- Location within Japan
- Location: Hiroshima Prefecture, Japan
- Coordinates: 34°25′36″N 132°19′49″E
- Construction began: 1971
- Opening date: 1981

Dam and spillways
- Height: 79.8 m (262 ft)
- Length: 255 m (837 ft)

Reservoir
- Total capacity: 8,460,000 m^{3} (299,000,000 cu ft)
- Catchment area: 38.4 km^{2} (14.8 sq mi)
- Surface area: 40 hectares (99 acres)

Uokiri Dam (Japanese: 魚切ダム) is a gravity dam located in Hiroshima Prefecture in Japan. The dam is used for flood control, water supply and power production. The catchment area of the dam is 38.4 km^{2}. The dam impounds about 40 ha of land when full and can store 8460 thousand cubic meters of water. The construction of the dam was started on 1971 and completed in 1981.
