= Megurigami Tameike Dam =

Dam in Hiroshima Prefecture, Japan

- Location within Japan
- Location: Hiroshima Prefecture, Japan
- Coordinates: 34°44′46″N 132°52′49″E
- Construction began: 1954
- Opening date: 1959

Dam and spillways
- Height: 18.6 m (61 ft)
- Length: 75 m (246 ft)

Reservoir
- Total capacity: 144 thousand cubic meters
- Catchment area: 0.7 sq. km
- Surface area: 3 hectares

Megurigami Tameike Dam (Japanese: 廻神溜池) is an earthfill dam located in Hiroshima Prefecture in Japan. The dam is used for irrigation. The catchment area of the dam is 0.7 km^{2}. The dam impounds about 3 ha of land when full and can store 144 thousand cubic meters of water. The construction of the dam was started on 1954 and completed in 1959.
