= Fukutomi Dam =

Dam in Hiroshima Prefecture, Japan

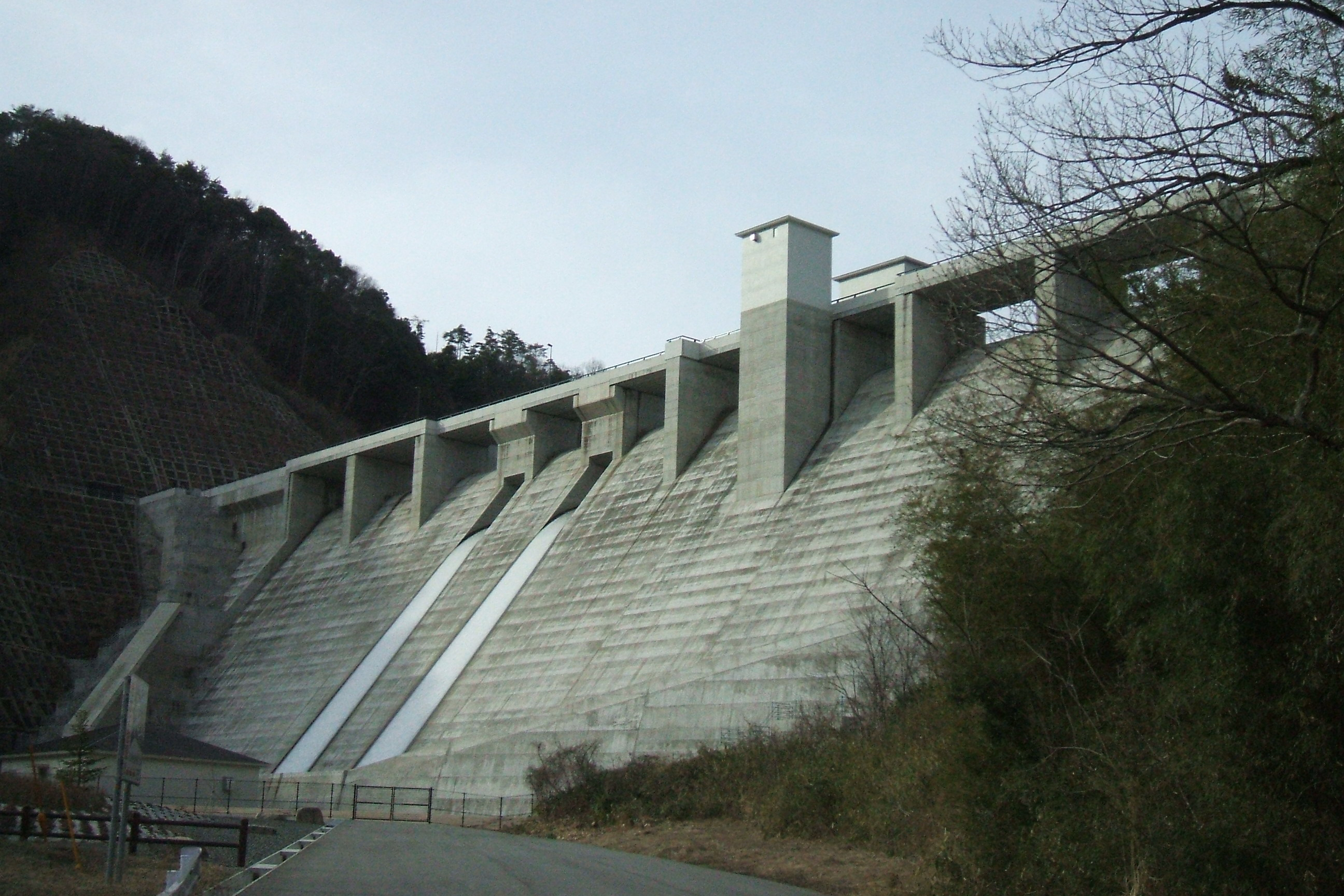

- Location within Japan
- Interactive map of Fukutomi Dam
- Location: Hiroshima Prefecture, Japan
- Coordinates: 34°31′36″N 132°46′25″E
- Construction began: 1975
- Opening date: 2008

Dam and spillways
- Height: 58 m (190 ft)
- Length: 292 m (958 ft)

Reservoir
- Total capacity: 10900 thousand cubic meters
- Catchment area: 53.8 sq. km
- Surface area: 70 hectares

Fukutomi Dam (Japanese: 福富ダム) is a gravity dam located in Hiroshima Prefecture in Japan. The dam is used for flood control and water supply. The catchment area of the dam is 53.8 km^{2}. The dam impounds about 70 ha of land when full and can store 10900 thousand cubic meters of water. The construction of the dam was started on 1975 and completed in 2008.
