= Uneyama-ohike Dam =

Dam in Hiroshima Prefecture, Japan

- Location within Japan
- Location: Hiroshima Prefecture, Japan
- Coordinates: 34°33′12″N 133°5′39″E
- Construction began: 1941
- Opening date: 1947

Dam and spillways
- Height: 16.9 m (55 ft)
- Length: 74.7 m (245 ft)

Reservoir
- Total capacity: 219,000 m^{3} (7,700,000 cu ft)
- Catchment area: 1.1 km^{2} (0.42 sq mi)
- Surface area: 2 hectares (4.9 acres)

Uneyama-ohike Dam (Japanese: 宇根山大池) is an earthfill dam located in Hiroshima Prefecture in Japan. The dam is used for irrigation. The catchment area of the dam is 1.1 km^{2}. The dam impounds about 2 ha of land when full and can store 219 thousand cubic meters of water. The construction of the dam was started on 1941 and completed in 1947.
