= Nabara Dam =

Dam in Hiroshima Prefecture, Japan

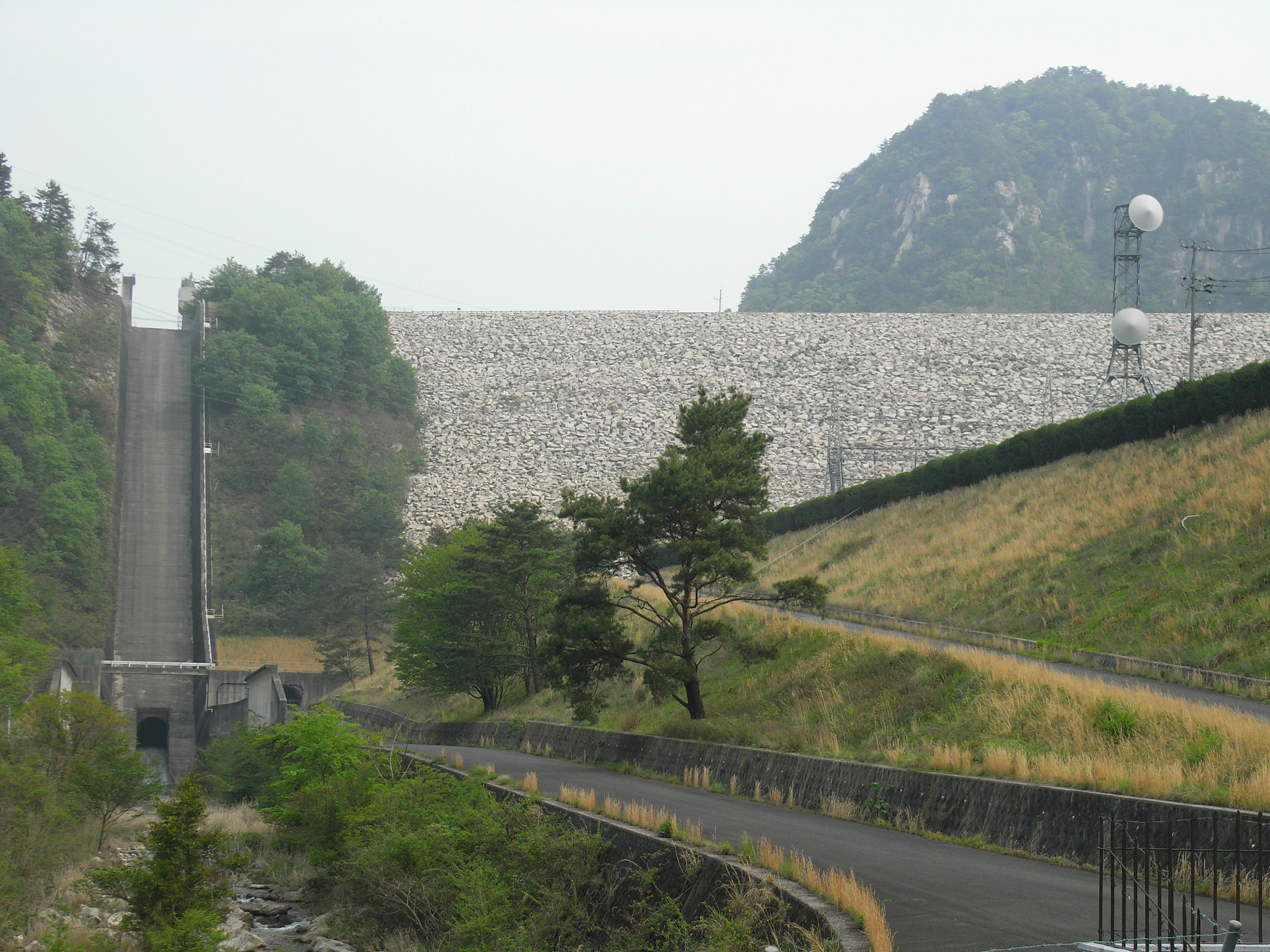
- Interactive map of Nabara Dam
- Location: Hiroshima Prefecture, Japan.
- Construction began: 1971
- Opening date: 1976

Dam and spillways
- Impounds: Nabara River
- Height: 85.5 m
- Length: 305 m

Reservoir
- Total capacity: 5,568,000 m^{3}
- Catchment area: 12.0 km^{2}
- Surface area: 24 hectares

Nabara Dam is a rockfill dam on the Nabara River (also known as Nanbara River) in Hiroshima Prefecture, Japan. It impounds a reservoir that supplies the Nabara pumped-storage hydroelectric power station operated by Chugoku Electric Power Company.

== History ==
Construction began in 1971 and the dam was completed in 1976, coinciding with the start of commercial operations at the associated power station.

== Design and specifications ==
The structure has a height of 85.5 meters and a crest length of 305 meters. The reservoir has a surface area of 24 hectares and total storage capacity of 5,568,000 cubic meters, with a catchment area of 12 square kilometers.

== Power generation ==
The Nabara Power Station is a pumped-storage facility with an installed capacity of 620 MW, provided by two reversible Francis pump turbines each rated at 310 MW.
