= Yamadagawa Dam =

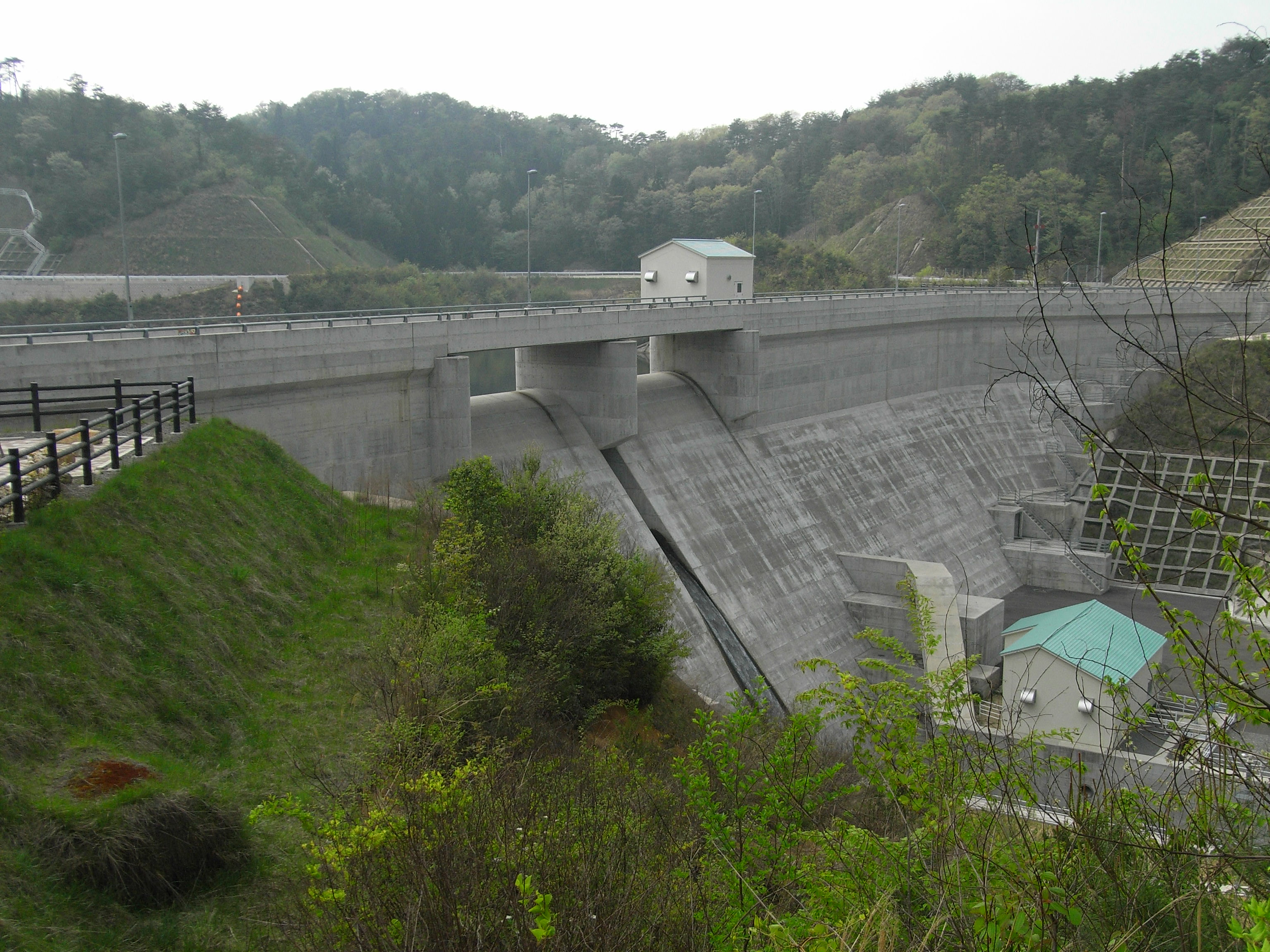
- Location: Hiroshima Prefecture, Japan
- Coordinates: 34°38′25″N 133°04′12″E
- Construction began: 1990
- Opening date: 2005

Dam and spillways
- Impounds: Yamadagawa River
- Height: 32.1 m
- Length: 204.8 m

Reservoir
- Total capacity: 7,000,000 m^{3}
- Catchment area: 5.6 km^{2}
- Surface area: 8 hectares

Yamadagawa Dam is a dam in the Hiroshima Prefecture of Japan.
