= Hattori-ohike Dam =

Dam in Hiroshima Prefecture, Japan

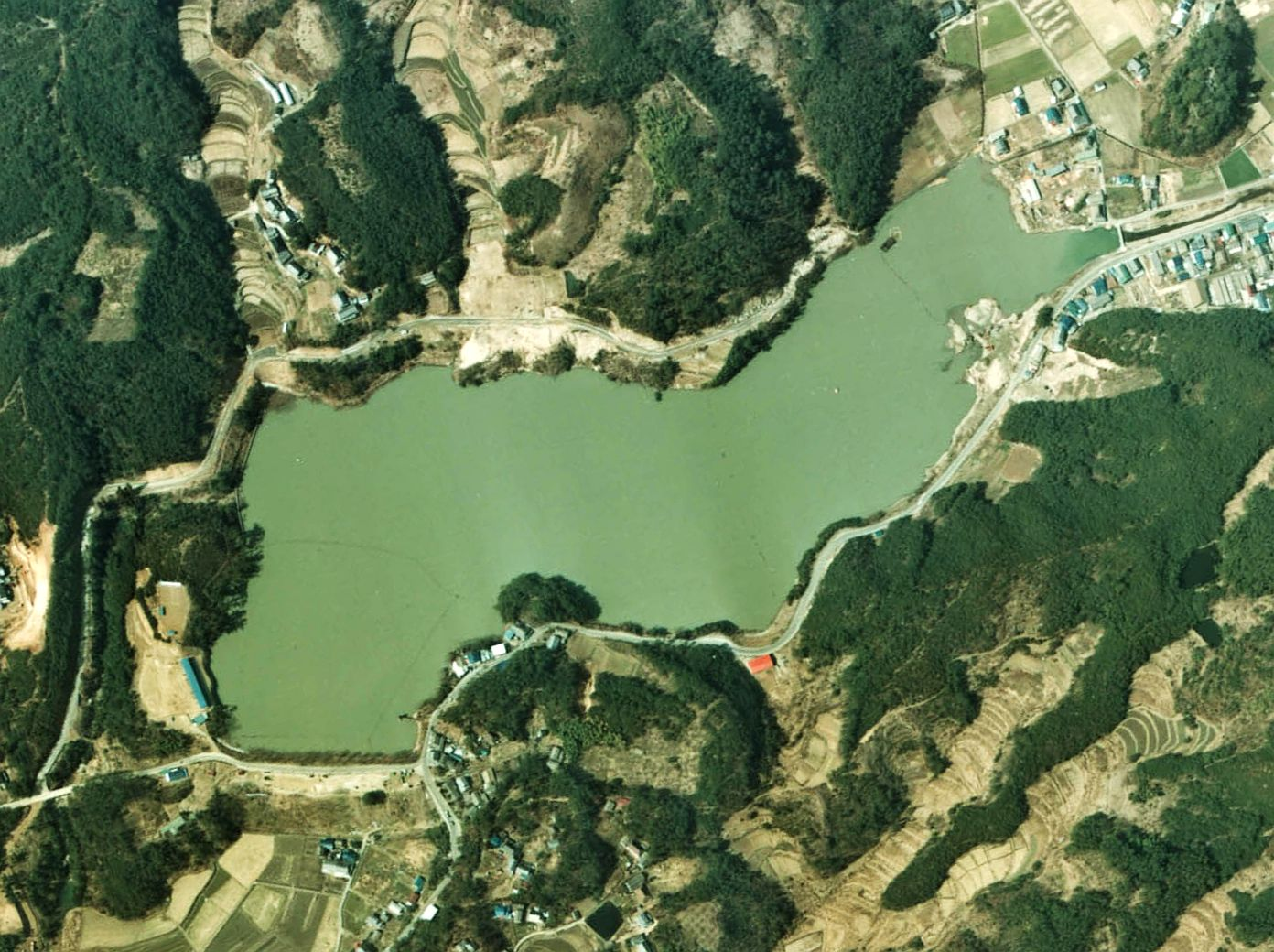

- Location within Japan
- Interactive map of Hattori-ohike Dam
- Location: Hiroshima Prefecture, Japan
- Coordinates: 34°33′31″N 133°19′03″E
- Construction began: 1989
- Opening date: 1997

Dam and spillways
- Height: 15 m (49 ft)
- Length: 190 m (620 ft)

Reservoir
- Total capacity: 650 thousand cubic meters
- Catchment area: 22 sq. km
- Surface area: 17 hectares

Hattori-ohike Dam (Japanese: 服部大池) is an earthfill dam located in Hiroshima Prefecture in Japan. The dam is used for irrigation. The catchment area of the dam is 22 km^{2}. The dam impounds about 17 ha of land when full and can store 650 thousand cubic meters of water. The construction of the dam was started on 1989 and completed in 1997.
