= Senzoku-ike No.2 Dam =

Dam in Hiroshima Prefecture, Japan

- Location within Japan
- Location: Hiroshima Prefecture, Japan
- Coordinates: 34°22′02″N 132°46′06″E
- Construction began: 1947
- Opening date: 1965

Dam and spillways
- Height: 18.2 m (60 ft)
- Length: 101.7 m (334 ft)

Reservoir
- Total capacity: 125,000 m^{3} (4,400,000 cu ft)
- Catchment area: 2 km^{2} (0.77 sq mi)
- Surface area: 2 hectares (4.9 acres)

Senzoku-ike No.2 Dam (Japanese: 第２千足池) is an earthfill dam located in Hiroshima Prefecture in Japan. The dam is used for irrigation. The catchment area of the dam is 2 km^{2}. The dam impounds about 2 ha of land when full and can store 125 thousand cubic meters of water. The construction of the dam was started on 1947 and completed in 1965.
