= Shin-Nakano Dam =

Dam in Hokkaido Prefecture, Japan

- Location within Japan
- Location: Hokkaido Prefecture, Japan
- Coordinates: 41°52′13″N 140°47′09″E
- Construction began: 1956
- Opening date: 1960

Dam and spillways
- Height: 53 m (174 ft)
- Length: 162 m (531 ft)

Reservoir
- Total capacity: 764,000 m^{3} (27,000,000 cu ft)
- Catchment area: 17.5 km^{2} (6.8 sq mi)
- Surface area: 8 hectares (20 acres)

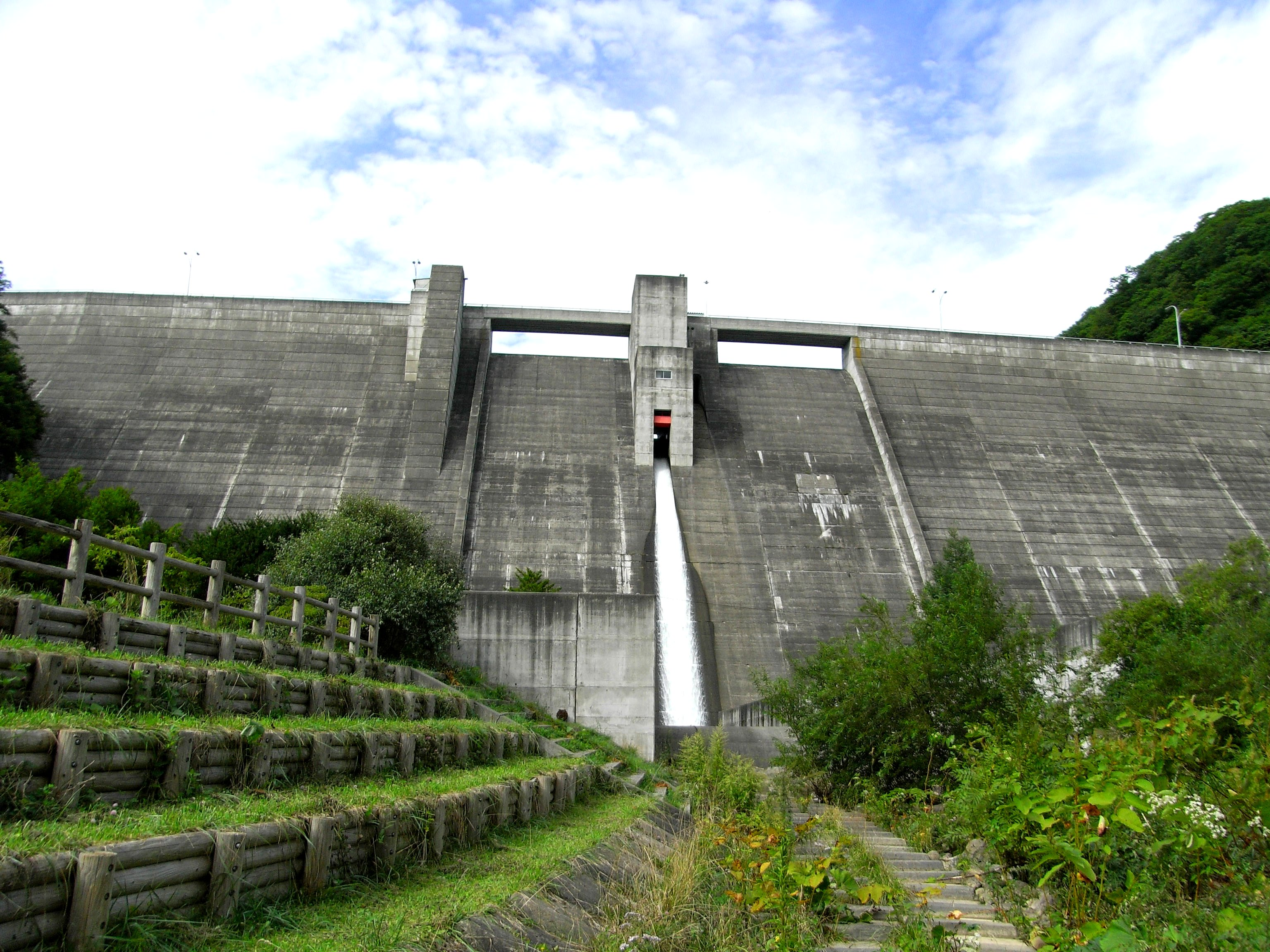
A photo of the dam

Shin-Nakano Dam (Japanese: 新中野ダム) is a gravity dam located in Hokkaido Prefecture in Japan. The dam is used for water supply. The catchment area of the dam is 17.5 km^{2}. The dam impounds about 8 ha of land when full and can store 764 thousand cubic meters of water. The construction of the dam was started on 1956 and completed in 1960.
