= Shibayama-Ike Dam =

Dam in Hiroshima Prefecture, Japan

- Location within Japan
- Location: Hiroshima Prefecture, Japan
- Coordinates: 34°57′18″N 133°11′01″E
- Opening date: 1919

Dam and spillways
- Height: 15.5 m (51 ft)
- Length: 50 m (160 ft)

Reservoir
- Total capacity: 69,000 m^{3} (2,400,000 cu ft)
- Catchment area: sq. km
- Surface area: 1 hectare (2.5 acres)

Shibayama-Ike Dam (Japanese: 芝山池) is an earthfill dam located in Hiroshima Prefecture in Japan. The dam is used for irrigation. The catchment area of the dam is km^{2}. The dam impounds about 1 ha of land when full and can store 69 thousand cubic meters of water. The construction of the dam was completed in 1919.
