= Uga Dam =

Dam in Hiroshima Prefecture, Japan

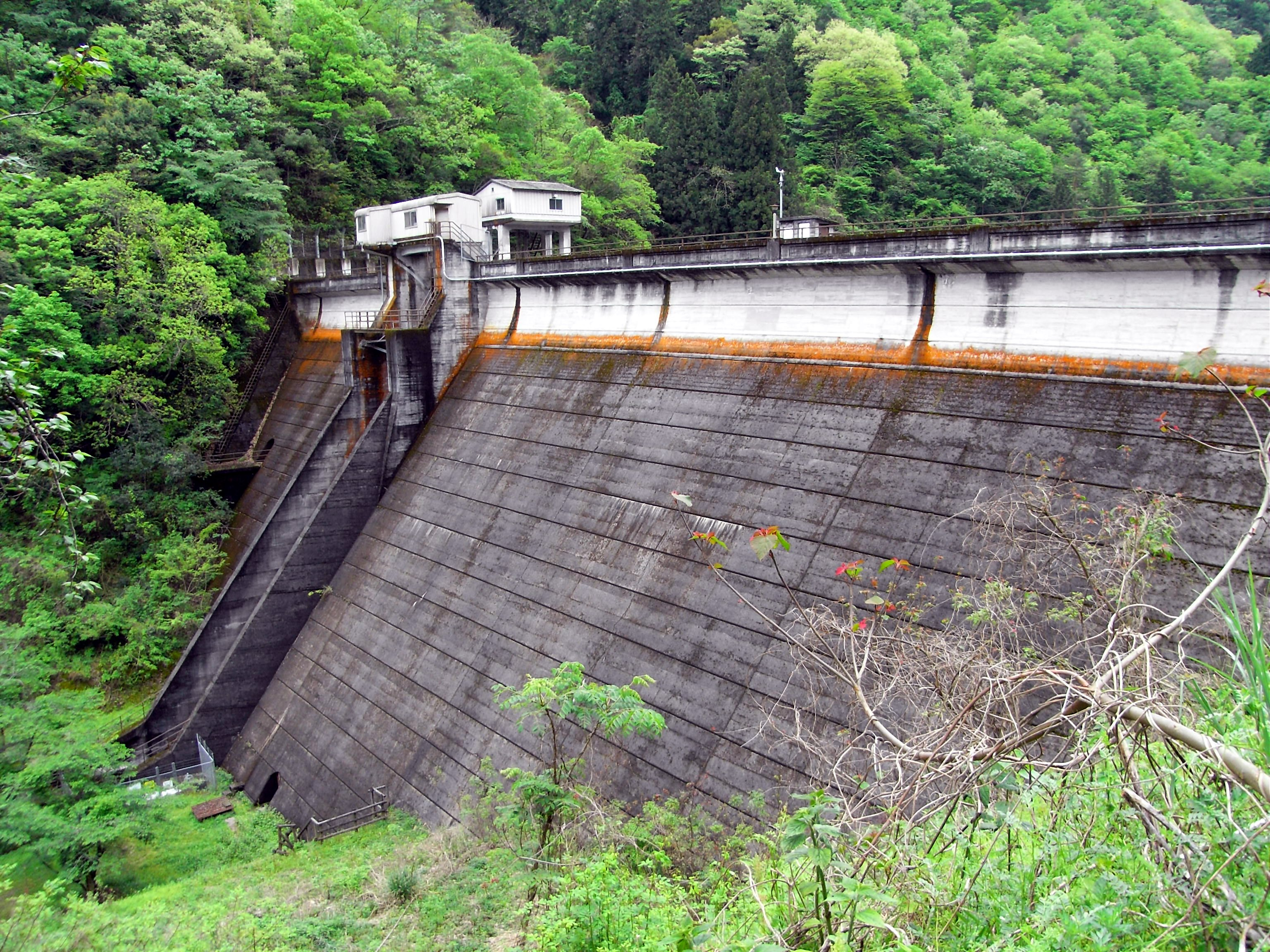

- Location within Japan
- Location: Hiroshima Prefecture, Japan
- Coordinates: 34°32′25″N 132°23′16″E
- Opening date: 1959

Dam and spillways
- Height: 31.5 m (103 ft)
- Length: 108 m (354 ft)

Reservoir
- Total capacity: 903,000 m^{3} (31,900,000 cu ft)
- Catchment area: 489.5 km^{2} (189.0 sq mi)
- Surface area: 8 hectares (20 acres)

Uga Dam (Japanese: 宇賀ダム) is a gravity dam located in Hiroshima Prefecture in Japan. The dam is used for power production. The catchment area of the dam is 489.5 km^{2}. The dam impounds about 8 ha of land when full and can store 903 thousand cubic meters of water. The construction of the dam was completed in 1959.
