= Kono-ike Dam =

Dam in Hiroshima Prefecture, Japan

- Location within Japan
- Location: Hiroshima Prefecture, Japan
- Coordinates: 34°28′50″N 132°37′04″E
- Construction began: 1946
- Opening date: 1953

Dam and spillways
- Height: 16 m (52 ft)
- Length: 239.5 m (786 ft)

Reservoir
- Total capacity: 570 thousand cubic meters
- Catchment area: 2 sq. km
- Surface area: 10 hectares

Kono-ike Dam (Japanese: 小野池) is an earthfill dam located in Hiroshima Prefecture in Japan. The dam is used for irrigation. The catchment area of the dam is 2 km^{2}. The dam impounds about 10 ha of land when full and can store 570 thousand cubic meters of water. The construction of the dam was started on 1946 and completed in 1953.
