= Naosuke Tameike Dam =

Dam in Hiroshima Prefecture, Japan

- Location within Japan
- Location: Hiroshima Prefecture, Japan
- Coordinates: 34°37′34″N 133°0′38″E
- Construction began: 1952
- Opening date: 1956

Dam and spillways
- Height: 16 m (52 ft)
- Length: 77 m (253 ft)

Reservoir
- Total capacity: 106 thousand cubic meters
- Catchment area: 0.9 sq. km
- Surface area: 2 hectares

Naosuke Tameike Dam (Japanese: 直助溜池) is an earthfill dam located in Hiroshima Prefecture in Japan. The dam is used for irrigation. The catchment area of the dam is 0.9 km^{2}. The dam impounds about 2 ha of land when full and can store 106 thousand cubic meters of water. The construction of the dam was started on 1952 and completed in 1956.
