= Shikawa Dam =

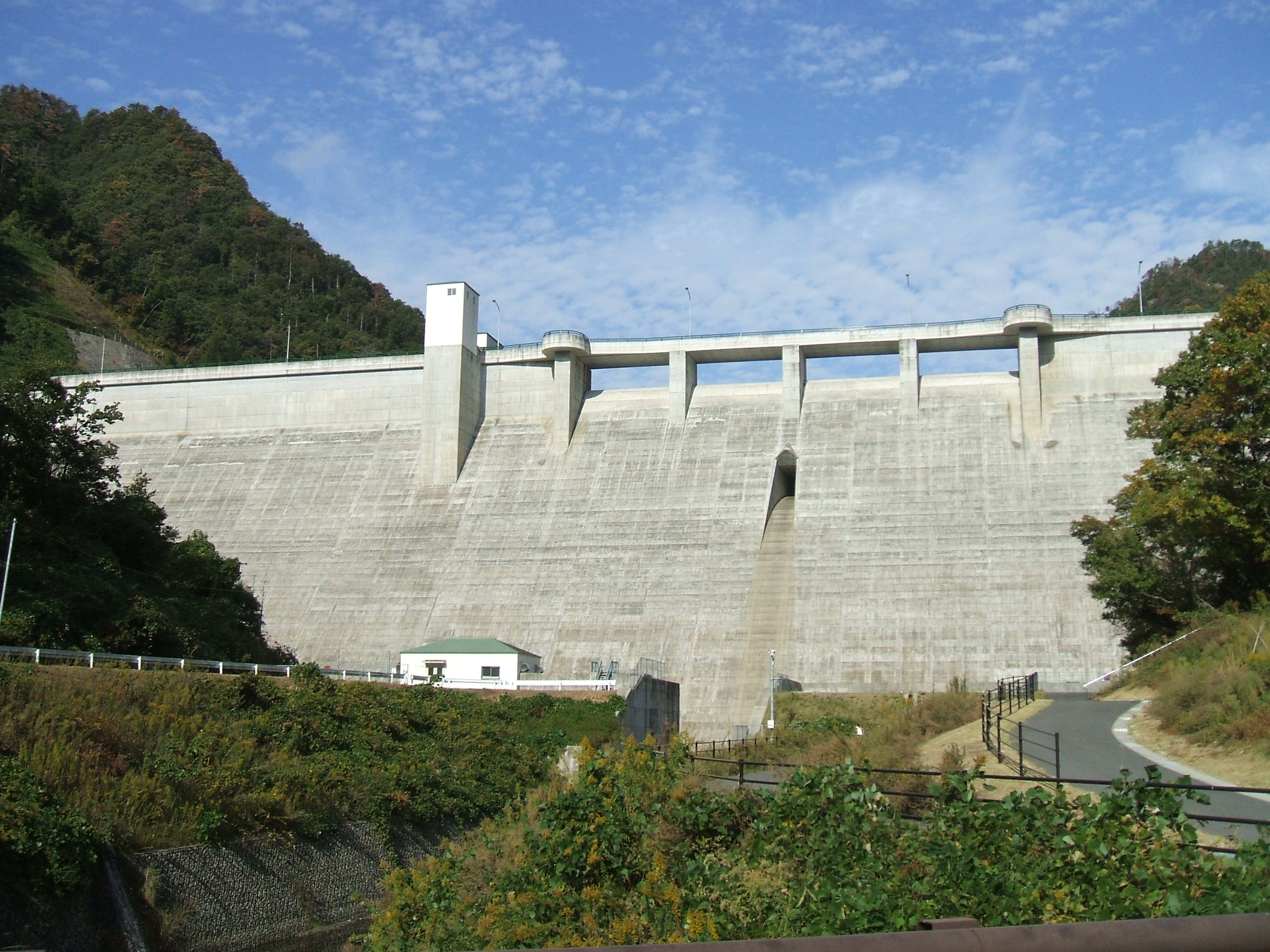
- Location: Fukuyama, Hiroshima Prefecture, Japan
- Coordinates: 34°36′02″N 133°20′20″E
- Construction began: 1974
- Opening date: 2004
- Operator(s): Tsutsumi Takashi Office. Developer: National Investment Development Co.

Dam and spillways
- Impounds: Kamo River
- Height: 58.9m
- Length: 251m

Reservoir
- Total capacity: 1,650,000 m^{3}
- Catchment area: 15 km^{2}
- Surface area: 13 hectares

Shikawa Dam (四川ダム, Shikawa Damu) is a dam in Fukuyama in Hiroshima Prefecture, Japan. The dam began construction in 1974, and the project was completed in 2004. The dam has a height of 58.9 metres and a length of 251 metres. The reservoir has a maximum capacity of 1,650,000 m^{3} and has a catchment area of 15 km^{2}.

== Development ==
The dam is currently managed by the Tsutsumi Takashi Office of Hiroshima Prefecture. The Shikawa Dam is a concrete gravity dam which was initiated as part of the Kamo River Flood Control Plan. The plan has a number of important functions and aims to improve irrigation and flood control in the area whilst providing water stabilization and environmental protection. The artificial lake, Lake Shiroyama (城山湖, Shiroyamako) formed by the dam is at present to the north, just past the dam. Takiyama castle is nearby.

The Shikawa Dam is in the upper reaches of the Kamo River. A pond dam for irrigation was originally completed as early as 1925 but underwent significant renovation between 1974 and 2004 to enable it to control flooding in the area.

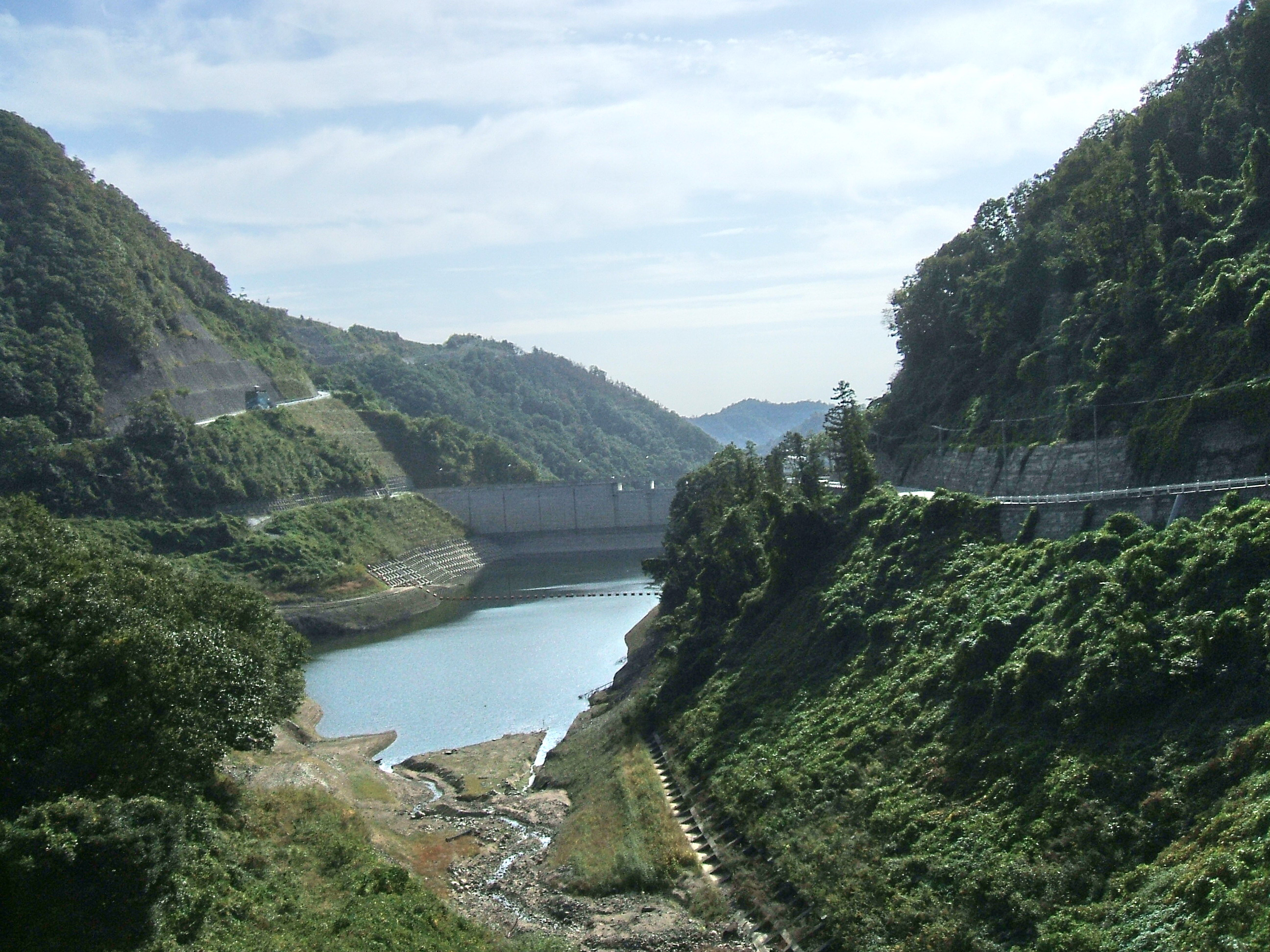
North side of the dam and small lake

== Recycling ==
The dam also serves as a sewage treatment works with its water treatment facilities. Sludge generated by the turbines is re-used. The mass recycling of the sludge earned the dam the Merit Award for Recycling in 2002 by the Ministry of Transport even before the dam was officially opened.
