= Kunikane-ike Dam =

Dam in Hiroshima Prefecture, Japan

- Location within Japan
- Location: Hiroshima Prefecture, Japan
- Coordinates: 34°50′41″N 133°0′06″E
- Construction began: 1946
- Opening date: 1953

Dam and spillways
- Height: 16.4 m (54 ft)
- Length: 100 m (330 ft)

Reservoir
- Total capacity: 1060 thousand cubic meters
- Catchment area: 13.6 sq. km
- Surface area: 25 hectares

Kunikane-ike Dam (Japanese: 国兼池) is an earthfill dam located in Hiroshima Prefecture in Japan. The dam is used for irrigation. The catchment area of the dam is 13.6 km^{2}. The dam impounds about 25 ha of land when full and can store 1060 thousand cubic meters of water. The construction of the dam was started on 1946 and completed in 1953.
