= Amegi-ike Dam =

Dam in Hiroshima Prefecture, Japan

- Location within Japan
- Interactive map of Amegi-ike Dam
- Location: Hiroshima Prefecture, Japan
- Coordinates: 34°35′17″N 133°18′27″E
- Construction began: 1981
- Opening date: 1987

Dam and spillways
- Height: 15 m (49 ft)
- Length: 92.5 m (303 ft)

Reservoir
- Total capacity: 118 thousand cubic meters
- Catchment area: 2.5 sq. km
- Surface area: 2 hectares

Amegi-ike Dam (Japanese: 雨木池) is an earthfill dam located in Hiroshima Prefecture in Japan. The dam is used for irrigation. The catchment area of the dam is 2.5 km^{2}. The dam impounds about 2 ha of land when full and can store 118 thousand cubic meters of water. The construction of the dam was started on 1981 and completed in 1987.
