= Nika Dam =

Dam in Hiroshima Prefecture, Japan

- Location within Japan
- Location: Hiroshima Prefecture, Japan
- Coordinates: 34°22′39″N 132°50′36″E
- Construction began: 1970
- Opening date: 2011

Dam and spillways
- Height: 47 m (154 ft)
- Length: 154 m (505 ft)

Reservoir
- Total capacity: 2710 thousand cubic meters
- Catchment area: 10.5 sq. km
- Surface area: 21 hectares

Nika Dam (Japanese: 仁賀ダム) is a gravity dam located in Hiroshima Prefecture in Japan. The dam is used for flood control. The catchment area of the dam is 10.5 km^{2}. The dam impounds about 21 ha of land when full and can store 2710 thousand cubic meters of water. The construction of the dam was started on 1970 and completed in 2011.
