= Aratani-ike Dam =

Dam in Hiroshima Prefecture, Japan

- Location within Japan
- Interactive map of Aratani-ike Dam
- Location: Hiroshima Prefecture, Japan
- Coordinates: 34°29′36″N 132°26′14″E
- Construction began: 1916
- Opening date: 1917

Dam and spillways
- Height: 17.5 m (57 ft)
- Length: 63 m (207 ft)

Reservoir
- Total capacity: 30 thousand cubic meters
- Catchment area: 0.2 sq. km
- Surface area: 2 hectares

Aratani-ike Dam (Japanese: 荒谷池) is an earthfill dam located in Hiroshima Prefecture in Japan. The dam is used for irrigation. The catchment area of the dam is 0.2 km^{2}. The dam impounds about 2 ha of land when full and can store 30 thousand cubic meters of water. The construction of the dam was started on 1916 and completed in 1917.
