= Daiwa-ike Dam =

Dam in Hiroshima Prefecture, Japan

Daiwa-ike
- Location within Japan
- Interactive map of Daiwa-ike
- Location: Hiroshima Prefecture, Japan
- Coordinates: 34°35′30″N 132°35′56″E
- Construction began: 2000
- Opening date: 2004

Dam and spillways
- Height: 15 m (49 ft)
- Length: 100 m (330 ft)

Reservoir
- Total capacity: 152 thousand cubic meters
- Catchment area: 1.5 sq. km
- Surface area: 2 hectares

Daiwa-ike (Japanese: 大和池) is an earthfill dam located in Hiroshima Prefecture, Japan. It serves irrigation purposes and has a catchment area of 1.5 km². When full, the dam impounds approximately 2 hectares of land and can store 152,000 cubic meters of water. Construction began in 2000 and was completed in 2004.
