= Ichihata Tameike Dam =

Dam in Hiroshima Prefecture, Japan

- Location within Japan
- Interactive map of Ichihata Tameike Dam
- Location: Hiroshima Prefecture, Japan
- Coordinates: 34°29′38″N 133°10′47″E
- Opening date: 1969

Dam and spillways
- Height: 18.5 m (61 ft)
- Length: 56.1 m (184 ft)

Reservoir
- Total capacity: 154 thousand cubic meters
- Catchment area: 0.7 sq. km
- Surface area: 4 hectares

Ichihata Tameike Dam (Japanese: 市畑溜池) is an earthfill dam located in Hiroshima Prefecture in Japan. The dam is used for irrigation. The catchment area of the dam is 0.7 km^{2}. The dam impounds about 4 ha of land when full and can store 154 thousand cubic meters of water. The construction of the dam was completed in 1969.
