= Kanzaki-ohike Dam =

Dam in Hiroshima Prefecture, Japan

Kanzaki-ohike
- Location within Japan
- Interactive map of Kanzaki-ohike
- Location: Hiroshima Prefecture, Japan
- Coordinates: 34°34′07″N 133°3′13″E
- Opening date: 1950

Dam and spillways
- Height: 17.9 m (59 ft)
- Length: 133 m (436 ft)

Reservoir
- Total capacity: 150 thousand cubic meters
- Catchment area: 2.2 sq. km
- Surface area: 3 hectares

Kanzaki-ohike (Japanese: 神崎大池) is an earthfill dam located in Hiroshima Prefecture in Japan. The dam is used for irrigation. The catchment area of the dam is 2.2 km^{2}. The dam impounds about 3 ha of land when full and can store 150 thousand cubic meters of water. The construction of the dam was completed in 1950.
