= Ryusenji Dam =

Dam in Hiroshima Prefecture, Japan

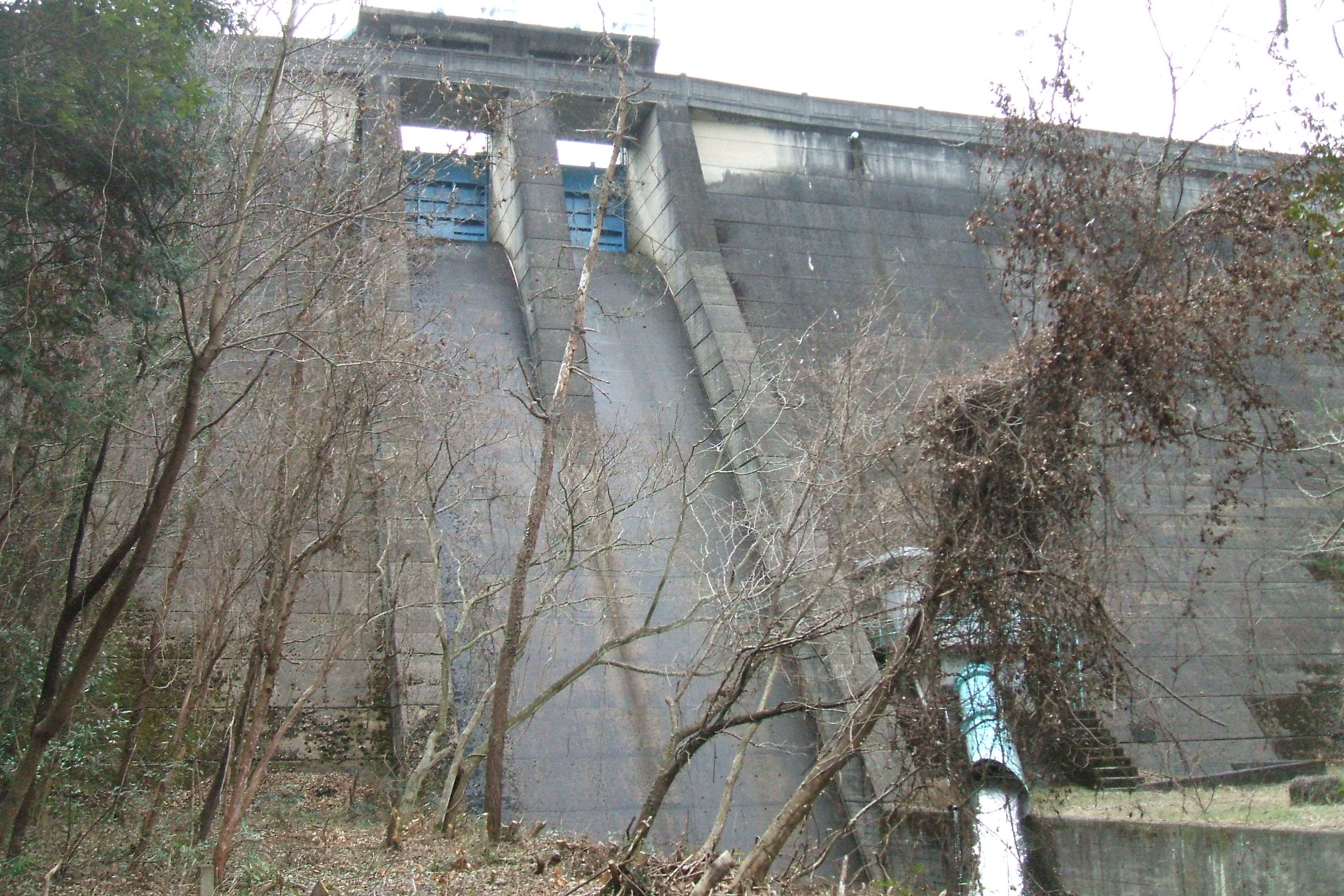

- Location within Japan
- Location: Hiroshima Prefecture, Japan
- Coordinates: 34°28′32″N 133°8′50″E
- Construction began: 1956
- Opening date: 1965

Dam and spillways
- Height: 35 m (115 ft)
- Length: 106 m (348 ft)

Reservoir
- Total capacity: 1,016,000 m^{3} (35,900,000 cu ft)
- Catchment area: 5.6 km^{2} (2.2 sq mi)
- Surface area: 8 hectares (20 acres)

Ryusenji Dam (Japanese: 竜泉寺ダム) is a gravity dam located in Hiroshima Prefecture in Japan. The dam is used for irrigation and water supply. The catchment area of the dam is 5.6 km^{2}. The dam impounds about 8 ha of land when full and can store 1016 thousand cubic meters of water. The construction of the dam was started on 1956 and completed in 1965.
