= Shobara Dam =

Dam in Hiroshima Prefecture, Japan

- Location within Japan
- Location: Hiroshima Prefecture, Japan
- Coordinates: 34°54′10″N 133°4′27″E
- Construction began: 1994
- Opening date: 2015

Dam and spillways
- Height: 42 m (138 ft)
- Length: 118.5 m (389 ft)

Reservoir
- Total capacity: 701,000 m^{3} (24,800,000 cu ft)
- Catchment area: 4.2 km^{2} (1.6 sq mi)
- Surface area: 6 hectares (15 acres)

Shobara Dam (Japanese: 庄原ダム) is a gravity dam located in Hiroshima Prefecture in Japan. The dam is used for flood control and water supply. The catchment area of the dam is 4.2 km^{2}. The dam impounds about 6 ha of land when full and can store 701 thousand cubic meters of water. The construction of the dam was started on 1994 and completed in 2015.
