= Koroku-ike Dam =

Dam in Hiroshima Prefecture, Japan

- Location within Japan
- Location: Hiroshima Prefecture, Japan
- Coordinates: 34°47′04″N 132°40′47″E
- Construction began: 1962
- Opening date: 1965

Dam and spillways
- Height: 22.5 m (74 ft)
- Length: 178.5 m (586 ft)

Reservoir
- Total capacity: 286 thousand cubic meters
- Catchment area: 3.4 sq. km
- Surface area: 4 hectares

Koroku-ike Dam (Japanese: 香六池) is an earthfill dam located in Hiroshima Prefecture in Japan. The dam is used for irrigation. The catchment area of the dam is 3.4 km^{2}. The dam impounds about 4 ha of land when full and can store 286 thousand cubic meters of water. The construction of the dam was started on 1962 and completed in 1965.
