= Iinoyama Dam =

Dam in Hiroshima Prefecture, Japan

- Location within Japan
- Interactive map of Iinoyama Dam
- Location: Hiroshima Prefecture, Japan
- Coordinates: 34°25′35″N 132°5′43″E
- Opening date: 1932

Dam and spillways
- Height: 18.5 m (61 ft)
- Length: 78.5 m (258 ft)

Reservoir
- Total capacity: 1790 thousand cubic meters
- Catchment area: 2.9 sq. km
- Surface area: 36 hectares

Iinoyama Dam (Japanese: 飯ノ山ダム) is an earthfill dam located in Hiroshima Prefecture in Japan. The dam is used for power production. The catchment area of the dam is 2.9 km^{2}. The dam impounds about 36 ha of land when full and can store 1790 thousand cubic meters of water. The construction of the dam was completed in 1932.
