= Watanose Dam =

Dam in Hiroshima Prefecture, Japan

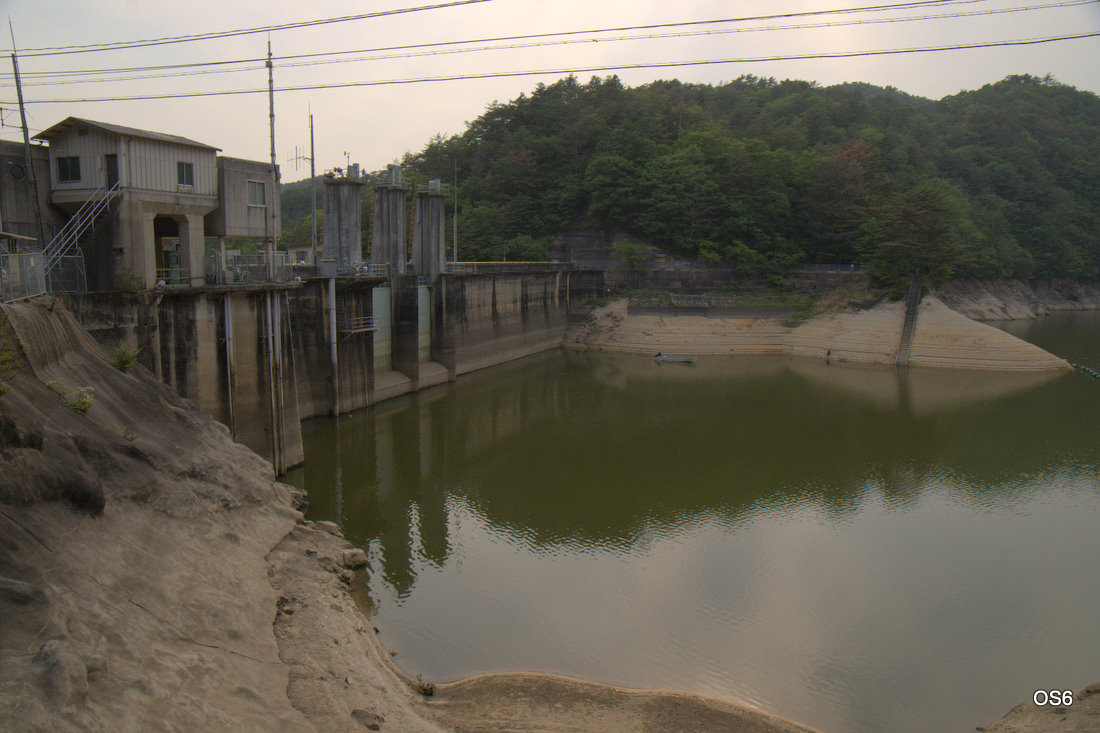

- Location within Japan
- Location: Hiroshima Prefecture, Japan
- Coordinates: 34°19′07″N 132°12′23″E
- Opening date: 1956

Dam and spillways
- Height: 34.5 m (113 ft)
- Length: 125.6 m (412 ft)

Reservoir
- Total capacity: 10,424,000 m^{3} (368,100,000 cu ft)
- Catchment area: 168.4 km^{2} (65.0 sq mi)
- Surface area: 97 hectares (240 acres)

Watanose Dam (Japanese: 渡之瀬ダム) is a gravity dam located in Hiroshima Prefecture in Japan. The dam is used for power production. The catchment area of the dam is 168.4 km^{2}. The dam impounds about 97 ha of land when full and can store 10424 thousand cubic meters of water. The construction of the dam was completed in 1956.
