= Kurose Dam =

Dam in Hiroshima Prefecture, Japan

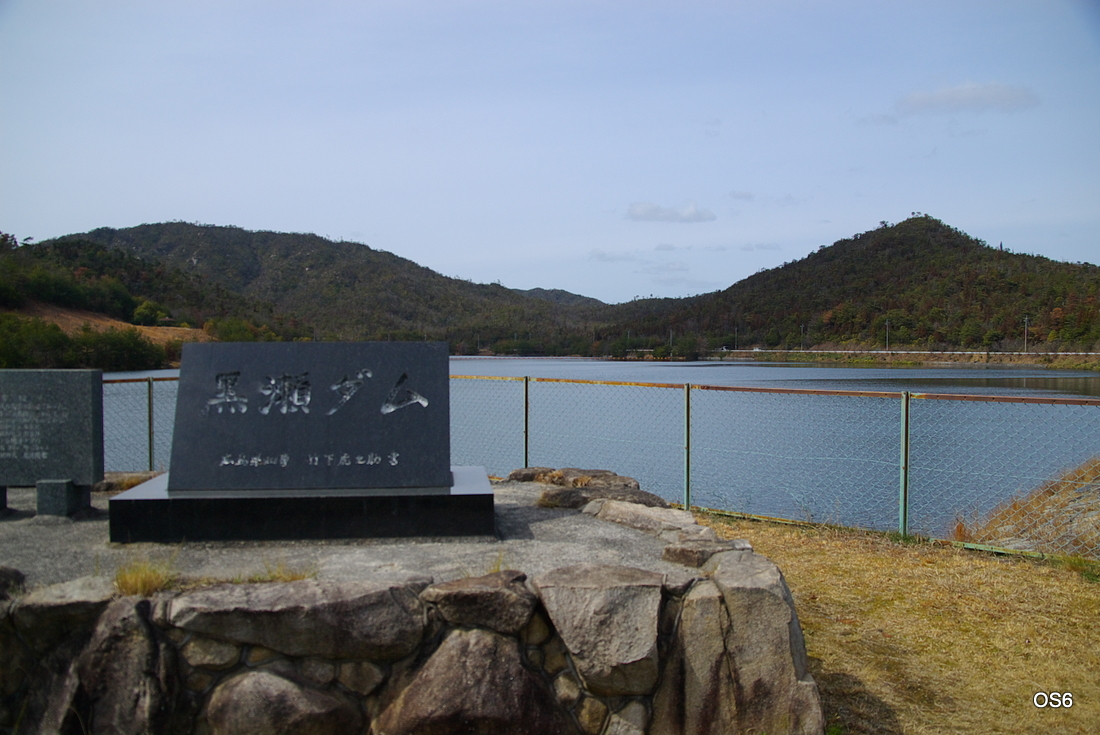

- Location within Japan
- Location: Hiroshima Prefecture, Japan
- Coordinates: 34°21′32″N 132°42′25″E
- Construction began: 1979
- Opening date: 1988

Dam and spillways
- Height: 30 m (98 ft)
- Length: 197 m (646 ft)

Reservoir
- Total capacity: 670 thousand cubic meters
- Catchment area: 2.4 sq. km
- Surface area: 10 hectares

Kurose Dam (Japanese: 黒瀬ダム) is an earthfill dam located in Hiroshima Prefecture in Japan, which is used for irrigation. The catchment area of the dam is 2.4 km^{2}. The dam impounds about 10 ha of land when full and can store 670 thousand cubic meters of water. The construction of the dam was started on 1979 and completed in 1988.
