= Norokawa Dam =

Dam in Hiroshima Prefecture, Japan

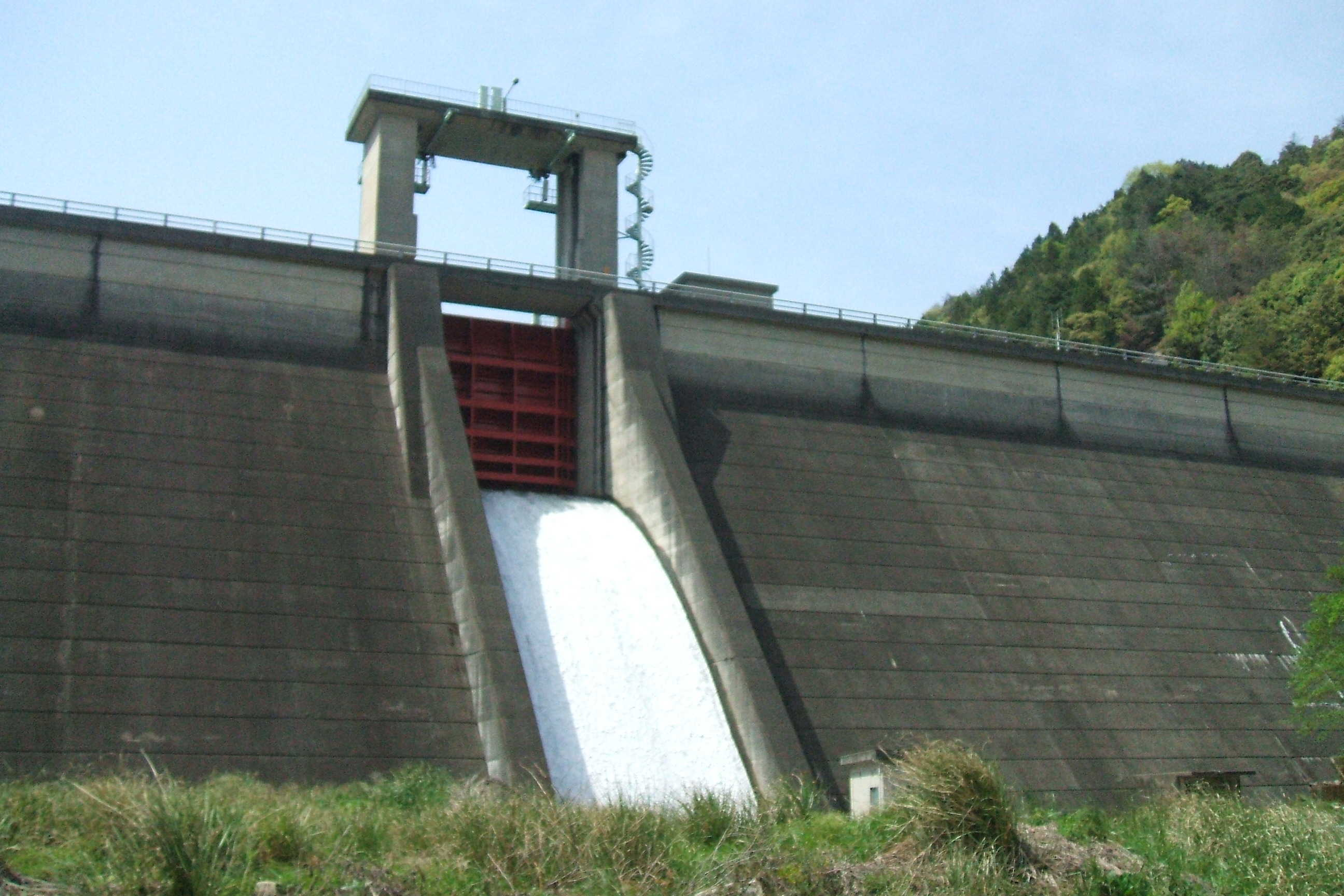

- Location within Japan
- Location: Hiroshima Prefecture, Japan
- Coordinates: 34°17′18″N 132°42′35″E
- Construction began: 1969
- Opening date: 1975

Dam and spillways
- Height: 44.8 m (147 ft)
- Length: 170 m (560 ft)

Reservoir
- Total capacity: 1,700,000 cubic meters
- Catchment area: 13 km^{2} (5.0 sq mi)
- Surface area: 14 hectares (35 acres)

Norokawa Dam (Japanese: 野呂川ダム) is a concrete gravity dam located in Hiroshima Prefecture in Japan. The dam is used for flood control. The catchment area of the dam is 13 km^{2}, equal to about 8 mi^{2}. The dam impounds about 14 ha of land when full and can store 1,700,000 m^{3} (or about 450 million US gallons) of water. The construction of the dam was started in 1969 and completed in 1975.
