= Mitsugi Dam =

Dam in Hiroshima Prefecture, Japan

- Location within Japan
- Location: Hiroshima Prefecture, Japan
- Coordinates: 34°30′00″N 133°4′35″E
- Construction began: 1973
- Opening date: 1988

Dam and spillways
- Height: 53.1 m (174 ft)
- Length: 206.2 m (677 ft)

Reservoir
- Total capacity: 5040 thousand cubic meters
- Catchment area: 54 sq. km
- Surface area: 34 hectares

Mitsugi Dam (Japanese: 御調ダム) is a gravity dam located in Hiroshima Prefecture in Japan. The dam is used for flood control. The catchment area of the dam is 54 km^{2}. The dam impounds about 34 ha of land when full and can store 5040 thousand cubic meters of water. The construction of the dam was started on 1973 and completed in 1988.
