= Hontao-ike Dam =

Dam in Hiroshima Prefecture, Japan

- Location within Japan
- Interactive map of Hontao-ike Dam
- Location: Hiroshima Prefecture, Japan
- Coordinates: 34°25′00″N 132°39′41″E
- Opening date: 1962

Dam and spillways
- Height: 18 m (59 ft)
- Length: 85 m (279 ft)

Reservoir
- Total capacity: 12 thousand cubic meters
- Catchment area: 1 sq. km
- Surface area: hectares

Hontao-ike Dam (Japanese: 本垰池) is an earthfill dam located in Hiroshima Prefecture in Japan. The dam is used for irrigation. The catchment area of the dam is 1 km^{2}. The dam can store 12 thousand cubic meters of water. The construction of the dam was completed in 1962.
