= Suzu-ike Dam =

Dam in Hiroshima Prefecture, Japan

- Location within Japan
- Location: Hiroshima Prefecture, Japan
- Coordinates: 34°29′21″N 133°17′04″E
- Opening date: 1971

Dam and spillways
- Height: 19 m (62 ft)
- Length: 257 m (843 ft)

Reservoir
- Total capacity: 386,000 m^{3} (13,600,000 cu ft)
- Catchment area: 2.8 km^{2} (1.1 sq mi)
- Surface area: 5 hectares (12 acres)

Suzu-ike Dam (Japanese: 鈴池) is an earthfill dam located in Hiroshima Prefecture in Japan. The dam is used for irrigation. The catchment area of the dam is 2.8 km^{2}. The dam impounds about 5 ha of land when full and can store 386 thousand cubic meters of water. The construction of the dam was completed in 1971.
