= Ariekami-ike Dam =

Dam in Hiroshima Prefecture, Japan

Ariekami-ike Dan
- Location within Japan
- Interactive map of Ariekami-ike Dan
- Location: Hiroshima Prefecture, Japan
- Coordinates: 34°26′14″N 133°13′01″E
- Opening date: 1899

Dam and spillways
- Height: 16.7 m (55 ft)
- Length: 91.4 m (300 ft)

Reservoir
- Total capacity: 113 thousand cubic meters
- Catchment area: 0.8 sq. km
- Surface area: 2 hectares

Ariekami-ike Dam (Japanese: 有江上池) is an earthfill dam located in Hiroshima Prefecture in Japan. The dam is used for irrigation. The catchment area of the dam is 0.8 km^{2}. The dam impounds about 2 ha of land when full and can store 113 thousand cubic meters of water. The construction of the dam was completed in 1899.
