= Senjogahara Dam =

Dam in Hiroshima Prefecture, Japan

- Location within Japan
- Location: Hiroshima Prefecture, Japan
- Coordinates: 34°26′50″N 132°53′53″E
- Construction began: 1989
- Opening date: 1997

Dam and spillways
- Height: 19 m (62 ft)
- Length: 98.5 m (323 ft)

Reservoir
- Total capacity: 113,000 m^{3} (4,000,000 cu ft)
- Catchment area: 1.3 km^{2} (0.50 sq mi)
- Surface area: 4 hectares (9.9 acres)

Senjogahara Dam (Japanese: 千丈ヶ原ダム) is a rockfill dam located in Hiroshima Prefecture in Japan. The dam is used for irrigation. The catchment area of the dam is 1.3 km^{2}. The dam impounds about 4 ha of land when full and can store 113 thousand cubic meters of water. The construction of the dam was started on 1989 and completed in 1997.
