= Kajike Dam =

Dam in Hiroshima Prefecture, Japan

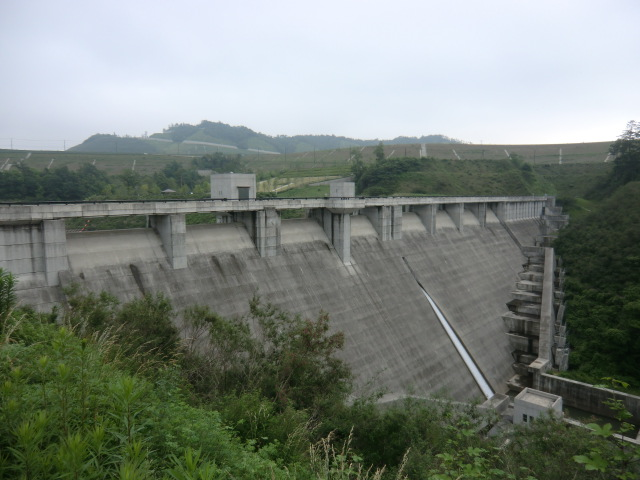

- Location within Japan
- Interactive map of Kajike Dam
- Location: Hiroshima Prefecture, Japan
- Coordinates: 34°26′06″N 132°22′37″E
- Construction began: 1987
- Opening date: 2008

Dam and spillways
- Height: 49 m (161 ft)
- Length: 170 m (560 ft)

Reservoir
- Total capacity: 1060 thousand cubic meters
- Catchment area: 3.5 sq. km
- Surface area: 8 hectares

Kajike Dam (Japanese: 梶毛ダム) is a gravity dam located in Hiroshima Prefecture in Japan. The dam is used for flood control. The catchment area of the dam is 3.5 km^{2}. The dam impounds about 8 ha of land when full and can store 1060 thousand cubic meters of water. The construction of the dam was started on 1987 and completed in 2008.
