= Masudamari Dam =

Dam in Hiroshima Prefecture, Japan

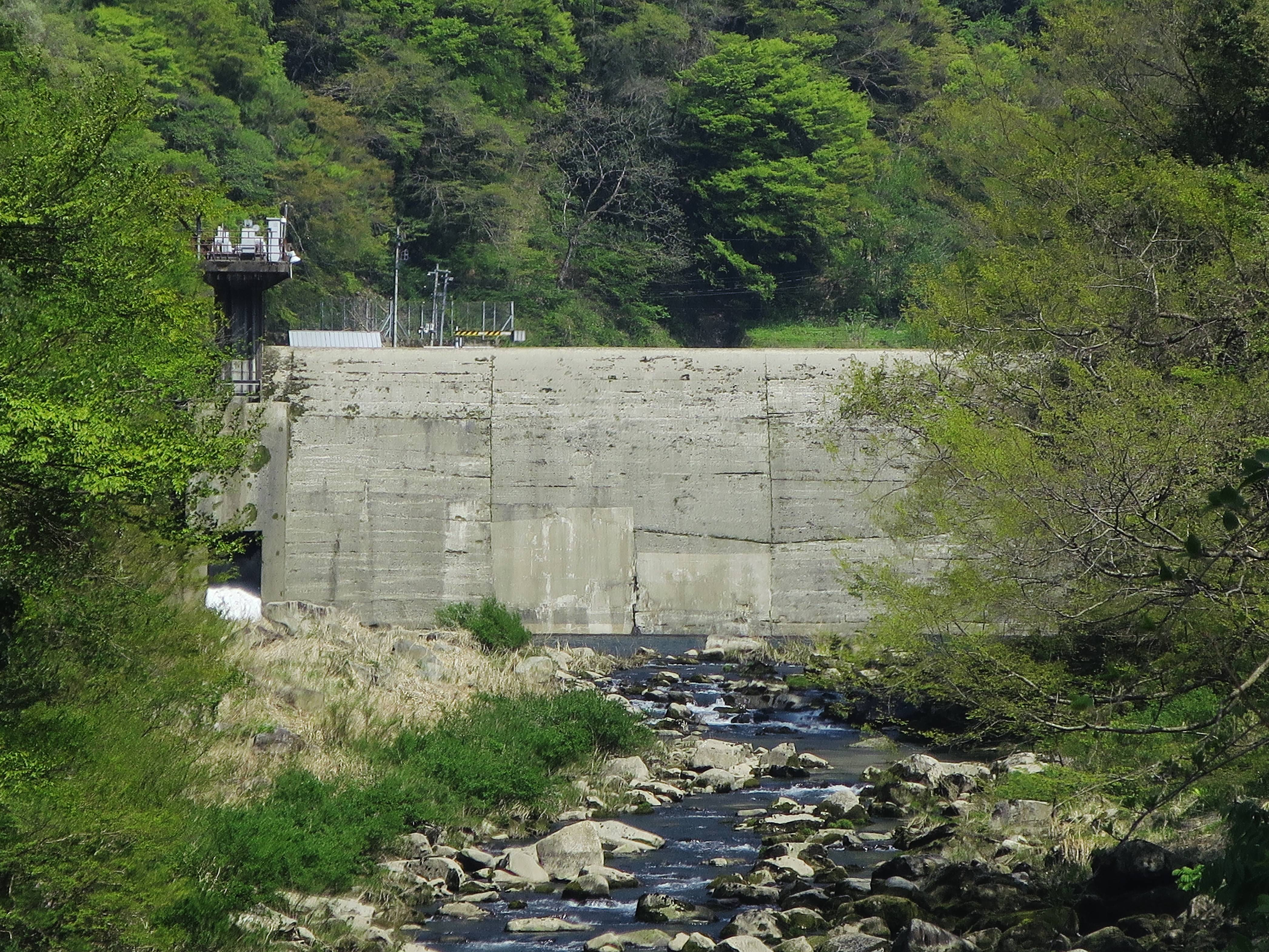

- Location within Japan
- Location: Hiroshima Prefecture, Japan
- Coordinates: 34°34′02″N 132°11′39″E
- Opening date: 1938

Dam and spillways
- Height: 19.2 m (63 ft)
- Length: 98 m (322 ft)

Reservoir
- Total capacity: 455 thousand cubic meters
- Catchment area: 146.8 sq. km
- Surface area: 9 hectares

Masudamari Dam (Japanese: 鱒溜ダム) is a gravity dam located in Hiroshima Prefecture in Japan. The dam is used for power production. The catchment area of the dam is 146.8 km^{2}. The dam impounds about 9 ha of land when full and can store 455 thousand cubic meters of water. The construction of the dam was completed in 1938.
