= Yokadani Dam =

Dam in Hiroshima Prefecture, Japan

- Location within Japan
- Location: Hiroshima Prefecture, Japan
- Coordinates: 34°24′45″N 133°20′01″E
- Opening date: 1963

Dam and spillways
- Height: 21 m (69 ft)
- Length: 74.6 m (245 ft)

Reservoir
- Total capacity: 361,000 m^{3} (12,700,000 cu ft)
- Catchment area: 4.6 km^{2} (1.8 sq mi)
- Surface area: 5 hectares (12 acres)

Yokadani Dam (Japanese: 八日谷ダム) is a rockfill dam located in Hiroshima Prefecture in Japan. The dam is used for irrigation. The catchment area of the dam is 4.6 km^{2}. The dam impounds about 5 ha of land when full and can store 361 thousand cubic meters of water. The construction of the dam was completed in 1963.
