= Senyo Dam =

Dam in Hiroshima Prefecture, Japan

- Location within Japan
- Location: Hiroshima Prefecture, Japan
- Coordinates: 34°43′53″N 133°20′01″E
- Construction began: 1972
- Opening date: 1976

Dam and spillways
- Height: 30 m (98 ft)
- Length: 97.5 m (320 ft)

Reservoir
- Total capacity: 195,000 m^{3} (6,900,000 cu ft)
- Catchment area: 2.2 km^{2} (0.85 sq mi)
- Surface area: 2 hectares (4.9 acres)

Senyo Dam (Japanese: 仙養ダム) is an earthfill dam located in Hiroshima Prefecture in Japan. The dam is used for irrigation. The catchment area of the dam is 2.2 km^{2}. The dam impounds about 2 ha of land when full and can store 195 thousand cubic meters of water. The construction of the dam was started on 1972 and completed in 1976.
