= Migo Dam =

Dam in Hiroshima Prefecture, Japan

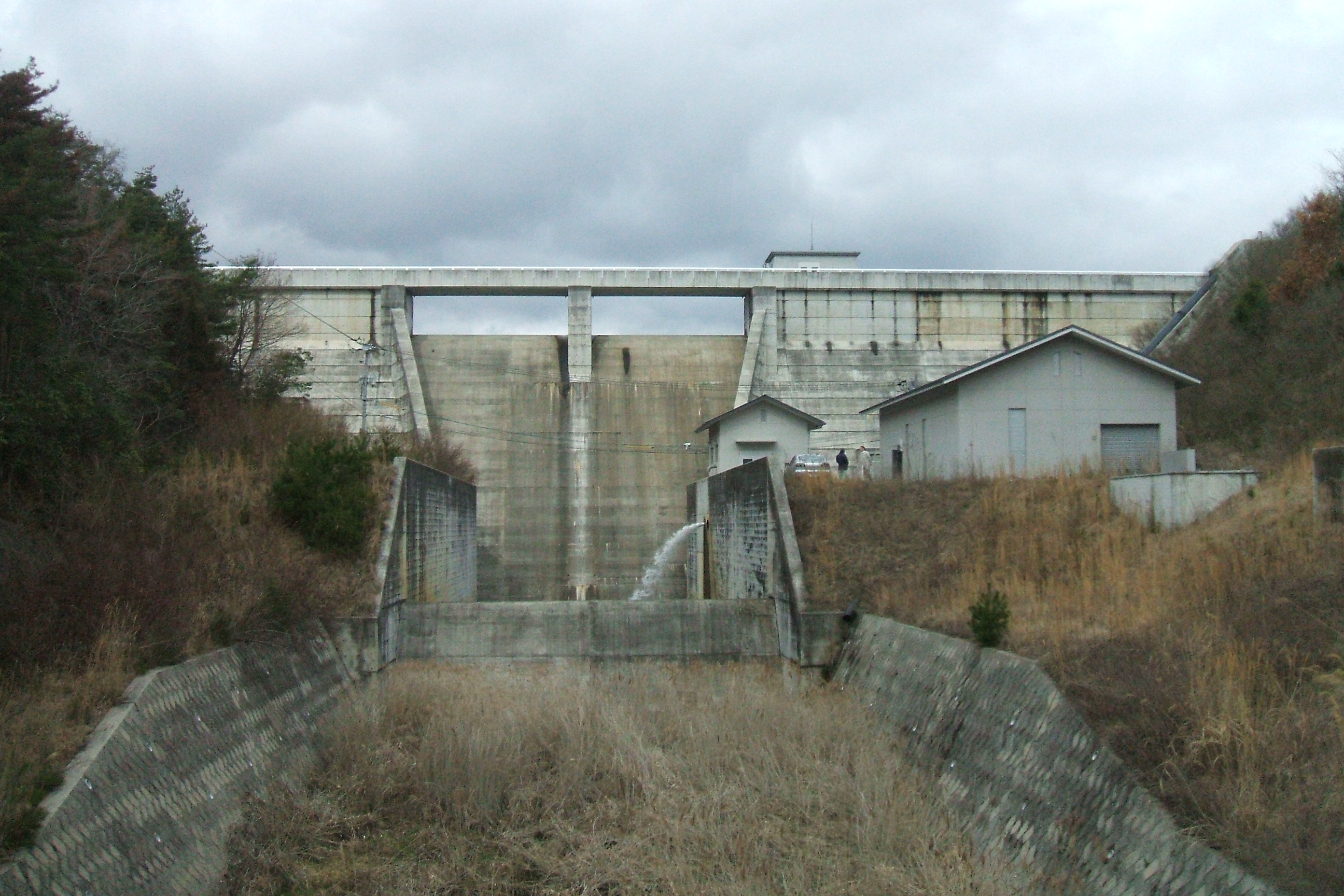

- Location within Japan
- Location: Hiroshima Prefecture, Japan
- Coordinates: 34°29′05″N 132°59′52″E
- Construction began: 1991
- Opening date: 2003

Dam and spillways
- Height: 28.2 m (93 ft)
- Length: 136 m (446 ft)

Reservoir
- Total capacity: 1660 thousand cubic meters
- Catchment area: 6.3 sq. km
- Surface area: 22 hectares

Migo Dam (Japanese: 三河ダム) is a gravity dam located in Hiroshima Prefecture in Japan. The dam is used for irrigation. The catchment area of the dam is 6.3 km^{2}. The dam impounds about 22 ha of land when full and can store 1660 thousand cubic meters of water. The construction of the dam was started on 1991 and completed in 2003.
