= Fukado Dam =

Dam in Hiroshima Prefecture, Japan

- Location within Japan
- Interactive map of Fukado Dam
- Location: Hiroshima Prefecture, Japan
- Coordinates: 34°22′52″N 132°41′05″E
- Opening date: 1968

Dam and spillways
- Height: 15 m (49 ft)
- Length: 78.6 m (258 ft)

Reservoir
- Total capacity: 160 thousand cubic meters
- Catchment area: 3.1 sq. km
- Surface area: 4 hectares

Fukado Dam (Japanese: 深道ダム) is an earthfill dam located in Hiroshima Prefecture in Japan. The dam is used for irrigation. The catchment area of the dam is 3.1 km^{2}. The dam impounds about 4 ha of land when full and can store 160 thousand cubic meters of water. The construction of the dam was completed in 1968.
