= Nakano Dam (Hiroshima) =

Dam in Hiroshima Prefecture, Japan

- Location within Japan
- Location: Hiroshima Prefecture, Japan
- Coordinates: 34°17′16″N 133°5′49″E
- Opening date: 1975

Dam and spillways
- Height: 44 m (144 ft)
- Length: 170 m (560 ft)

Reservoir
- Total capacity: 416 thousand cubic meters
- Catchment area: 1.1 sq. km
- Surface area: 4 hectares

Nakano Dam (Japanese: 中野ダム) is a rockfill dam located in Hiroshima Prefecture in Japan. The dam is used for irrigation. The catchment area of the dam is 1.1 km^{2}. The dam impounds about 4 ha of land when full and can store 416 thousand cubic meters of water. The construction of the dam was completed in 1975.
