= Metani Dam =

Dam in Hiroshima Prefecture, Japan

- Location within Japan
- Location: Hiroshima Prefecture, Japan
- Coordinates: 34°38′21″N 132°58′36″E
- Construction began: 1977
- Opening date: 1986

Dam and spillways
- Height: 49.7 m (163 ft)
- Length: 250 m (820 ft)

Reservoir
- Total capacity: 1308 thousand cubic meters
- Catchment area: 8.1 sq. km
- Surface area: 10 hectares

Metani Dam (Japanese: 目谷ダム) is a rockfill dam located in Hiroshima Prefecture in Japan. The dam is used for irrigation. The catchment area of the dam is 8.1 km^{2}. The dam impounds about 10 ha of land when full and can store 1308 thousand cubic meters of water. The construction of the dam was started on 1977 and completed in 1986.
