= Ohgidani-ike Dam =

Dam in Hiroshima Prefecture, Japan

- Location within Japan
- Location: Hiroshima Prefecture, Japan
- Coordinates: 34°53′54″N 133°1′21″E
- Construction began: 1940
- Opening date: 1953

Dam and spillways
- Height: 17.5 m (57 ft)
- Length: 85 m (279 ft)

Reservoir
- Total capacity: 295,000 m^{3} (10,400,000 cu ft)
- Catchment area: 1.9 km^{2} (0.73 sq mi)
- Surface area: 4 hectares (9.9 acres)

Ohgidani-ike Dam (Japanese: 扇谷池) is an earthfill dam located in Hiroshima Prefecture in Japan. The dam is used for irrigation. The catchment area of the dam is 1.9 km^{2}. The dam impounds about 4 ha of land when full and can store 295 thousand cubic meters of water. The construction of the dam was started on 1940 and completed in 1953.
