= Ohkubo Dam =

Dam in Hiroshima Prefecture, Japan

- Location within Japan
- Location: Hiroshima Prefecture, Japan
- Coordinates: 34°27′47″N 132°46′03″E
- Opening date: 1974

Dam and spillways
- Height: 26 m (85 ft)
- Length: 170 m (560 ft)

Reservoir
- Total capacity: 255,000 m^{3} (9,000,000 cu ft)
- Catchment area: 2.5 km^{2} (0.97 sq mi)
- Surface area: 4 hectares (9.9 acres)

Ohkubo Dam (Japanese: 大久保ダム) is an earthfill dam located in Hiroshima Prefecture in Japan. The dam is used for irrigation. The catchment area of the dam is 2.5 km^{2}. The dam impounds about 4 ha of land when full and can store 255 thousand cubic meters of water. The construction of the dam was completed in 1974.
