= Matsunaga Tameike Dam =

Dam in Hiroshima Prefecture, Japan

Matsunaga Tameike
- Location within Japan
- Location: Hiroshima Prefecture, Japan
- Coordinates: 34°28′48″N 133°15′03″E
- Opening date: 1968

Dam and spillways
- Height: 25 m (82 ft)
- Length: 126 m (413 ft)

Reservoir
- Total capacity: 382 thousand cubic meters
- Catchment area: 1.8 sq. km
- Surface area: 4 hectares

Matsunaga Tameike (Japanese: 松永溜池) is a rockfill dam located in Hiroshima Prefecture in Japan. The dam is used for irrigation. The catchment area of the dam is 1.8 km^{2}. The dam impounds about 4 ha of land when full and can store 382 thousand cubic meters of water. The construction of the dam was completed in 1968.
