= Kyomaru Dam =

Dam in Hiroshima Prefecture, Japan

- Location within Japan
- Location: Hiroshima Prefecture, Japan
- Coordinates: 34°36′32″N 133°0′29″E
- Construction began: 1977
- Opening date: 1996

Dam and spillways
- Height: 25.5 m (84 ft)
- Length: 117 m (384 ft)

Reservoir
- Total capacity: 499 thousand cubic meters
- Catchment area: 3.3 sq. km
- Surface area: 10 hectares

Kyomaru Dam (Japanese: 京丸ダム) is a gravity dam located in Hiroshima Prefecture in Japan. The dam is used for irrigation. The catchment area of the dam is 3.3 km^{2}. The dam impounds about 10 ha of land when full and can store 499 thousand cubic meters of water. The construction of the dam was started on 1977 and completed in 1996.
