= Kawaidani Choseichi Dam =

Dam in Hiroshima Prefecture, Japan

Kawaidani Choseichi
- Location within Japan
- Interactive map of Kawaidani Choseichi
- Location: Hiroshima Prefecture, Japan
- Coordinates: 34°39′44″N 133°15′54″E
- Opening date: 1971

Dam and spillways
- Height: 16.5 m (54 ft)
- Length: 33.5 m (110 ft)

Reservoir
- Total capacity: 47 thousand cubic meters
- Catchment area: 8.7 sq. km
- Surface area: 1 hectares

Kawaidani Choseichi (Japanese: 川井谷調整池) is a gravity dam located in Hiroshima Prefecture in Japan. The dam is used for flood control. The catchment area of the dam is 8.7 km^{2}. The dam impounds about 1 ha of land when full and can store 47 thousand cubic meters of water. The construction of the dam was completed in 1971.
