= Tateiwa Dam (Hiroshima) =

Dam in Hiroshima Prefecture, Japan

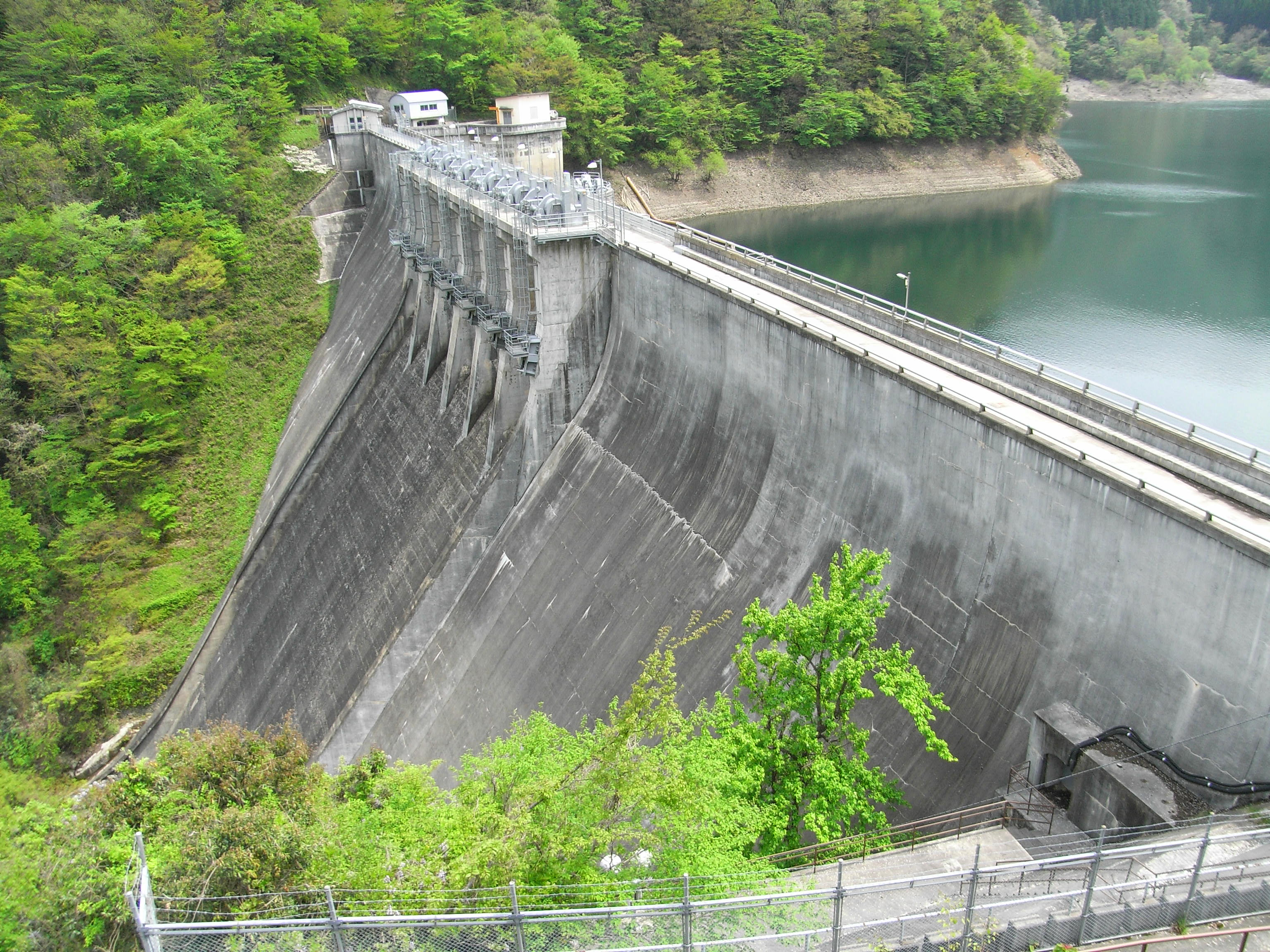
- Interactive map of Tateiwa Dam
- Location: Hiroshima Prefecture, Japan.
- Coordinates: 34°32′40″N 132°09′50″E
- Opening date: 1939

Dam and spillways
- Impounds: Ōta River
- Height: 67.4 m
- Length: 179 m

Reservoir
- Total capacity: 17,200,000 m^{3}
- Catchment area: 129.6 km^{2}
- Surface area: 89 hectares

Tateiwa Dam is a dam in the Hiroshima Prefecture of Japan.
