= Ōdomari Dam =

Coordinates: 34°41′54″N 132°18′49″E

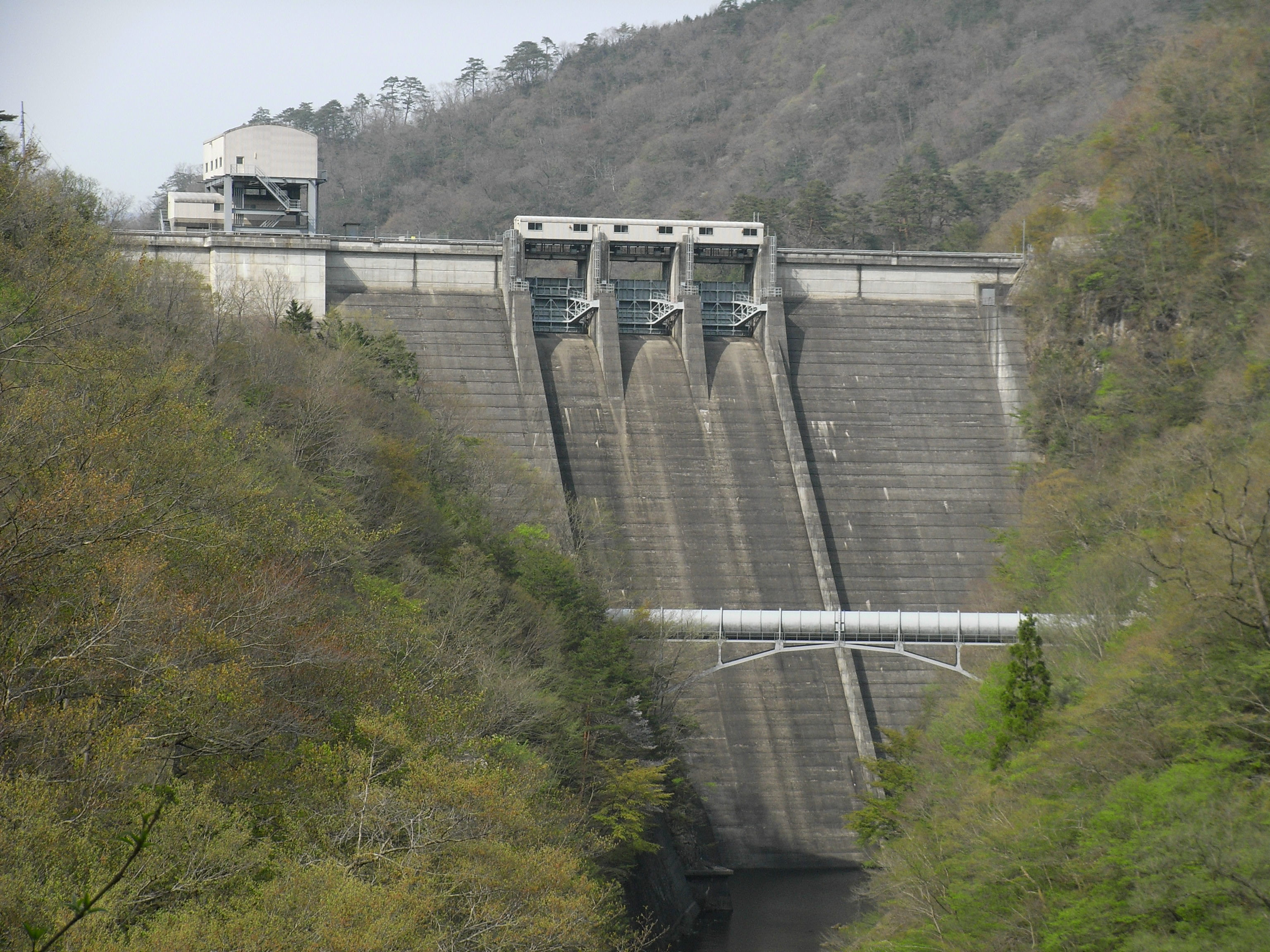
- Interactive map of Ōdomari Dam
- Location: Hiroshima Prefecture, Japan
- Opening date: 1935

Dam and spillways
- Impounds: Takiyama River
- Height: 74 m
- Length: 155 m

Reservoir
- Total capacity: 31,100,000 m^{3}
- Catchment area: 220.7 km^{2}
- Surface area: 146 hectares

Ōdomari Dam (王泊ダム) is a dam in Hiroshima Prefecture, Japan.

== See also ==
- Dams in Japan
- Ōta River
