= Kumano Dam =

Dam in Hiroshima Prefecture, Japan

- Location within Japan
- Location: Hiroshima Prefecture, Japan
- Coordinates: 34°25′16″N 133°21′08″E
- Construction began: 1919
- Opening date: 1925

Dam and spillways
- Height: 29.1 m (95 ft)
- Length: 189.7 m (622 ft)

Reservoir
- Total capacity: 730 thousand cubic meters
- Catchment area: 5.9 sq. km
- Surface area: 9 hectares

Kumano Dam (Japanese: 熊野ダム) is an earthfill dam located in Hiroshima Prefecture in Japan. The dam is used for irrigation and water supply. The catchment area of the dam is 5.9 km^{2}. The dam impounds about 9 ha of land when full and can store 730 thousand cubic meters of water. The construction of the dam was started on 1919 and completed in 1925.
