= Odayama-ike Dam =

Dam in Hiroshima Prefecture, Japan

- Location within Japan
- Location: Hiroshima Prefecture, Japan
- Coordinates: 34°21′59″N 132°39′54″E
- Opening date: 1961

Dam and spillways
- Height: 15.6 m (51 ft)
- Length: 150.7 m (494 ft)

Reservoir
- Total capacity: 187,000 m^{3} (6,600,000 cu ft)
- Catchment area: 2 km^{2} (0.77 sq mi)
- Surface area: 3 hectares (7.4 acres)

Odayama-ike Dam (Japanese: 小田山池) is an earthfill dam located in Hiroshima Prefecture in Japan. The dam is used for irrigation. The catchment area of the dam is 2 km^{2}. The dam impounds about 3 ha of land when full and can store 187 thousand cubic meters of water. The construction of the dam was completed in 1961.
