= Okuyama Dam (Hiroshima) =

Dam in Hiroshima Prefecture, Japan

- Location within Japan
- Location: Hiroshima Prefecture, Japan
- Coordinates: 34°18′57″N 133°10′42″E
- Construction began: 1991
- Opening date: 2009

Dam and spillways
- Height: 32.7 m (107 ft)
- Length: 106 m (348 ft)

Reservoir
- Total capacity: 291,000 m^{3} (10,300,000 cu ft)
- Catchment area: 1.4 km^{2} (0.54 sq mi)
- Surface area: 3 hectares (7.4 acres)

Okuyama Dam (Japanese: 奥山ダム) is a gravity dam located in Hiroshima Prefecture in Japan. The dam is used for irrigation. The catchment area of the dam is 1.4 km^{2}. The dam impounds about 3 ha of land when full and can store 291 thousand cubic meters of water. The construction of the dam was started on 1991 and completed in 2009.
