= Itaki Tameike Dam =

Dam in Hiroshima Prefecture, Japan

Itaki Tameike
- Location within Japan
- Interactive map of Itaki Tameike
- Location: Hiroshima Prefecture, Japan
- Coordinates: 34°39′53″N 132°48′12″E
- Construction began: 1971
- Opening date: 1983

Dam and spillways
- Height: 33 m (108 ft)
- Length: 186 m (610 ft)

Reservoir
- Total capacity: 302 thousand cubic meters
- Catchment area: 2.7 sq. km
- Surface area: 3 hectares

Itaki Tameike (Japanese: 板木溜池) is an earthfill dam located in Hiroshima Prefecture in Japan. The dam is used for irrigation. The catchment area of the dam is 2.7 km^{2}. The dam impounds about 3 ha of land when full and can store 302 thousand cubic meters of water. The construction of the dam was started on 1971 and completed in 1983.
