= Myojin Dam =

Dam in Hiroshima Prefecture, Japan

- Location within Japan
- Location: Hiroshima Prefecture, Japan
- Coordinates: 34°35′08″N 132°30′18″E
- Opening date: 1976

Dam and spillways
- Height: 88.5 m (290 ft)
- Length: 402 m (1,319 ft)

Reservoir
- Total capacity: 6145 thousand cubic meters
- Catchment area: 1.4 sq. km
- Surface area: 25 hectares

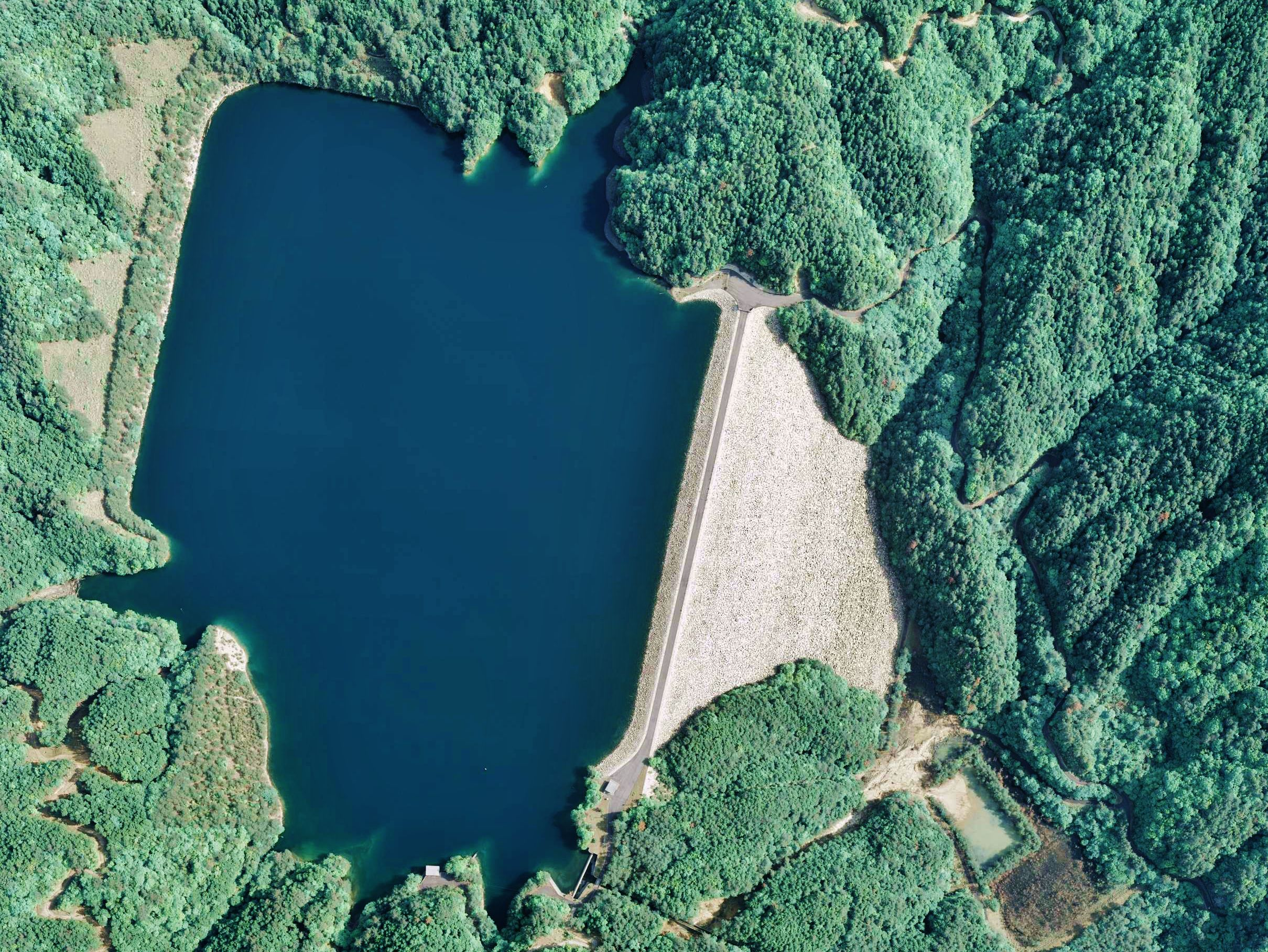

Myojin Dam (Japanese: 明神ダム) is a rockfill dam located in Hiroshima Prefecture in Japan. The dam is used for power production. The catchment area of the dam is 1.4 km^{2}. The dam impounds about 25 ha of land when full and can store 6145 thousand cubic meters of water. The construction of the dam was completed in 1976.
