= Korinji-ike Dam =

Dam in Hiroshima Prefecture, Japan

- Location within Japan
- Location: Hiroshima Prefecture, Japan
- Coordinates: 34°25′58″N 133°20′51″E
- Construction began: 1993
- Opening date: 1999

Dam and spillways
- Height: 19.9 m (65 ft)
- Length: 155 m (509 ft)

Reservoir
- Total capacity: 433 thousand cubic meters
- Catchment area: 2.5 sq. km
- Surface area: 5 hectares

Korinji-ike Dam (Japanese: 光林寺池) is an earthfill dam located in Hiroshima Prefecture in Japan. The dam is used for irrigation. The catchment area of the dam is 2.5 km^{2}. The dam impounds about 5 ha of land when full and can store 433 thousand cubic meters of water. The construction of the dam was started on 1993 and completed in 1999.
