= Ohyama Oku-Ike Dam =

Dam in Hiroshima Prefecture, Japan

- Location within Japan
- Location: Hiroshima Prefecture, Japan
- Coordinates: 34°18′28″N 133°10′43″E
- Opening date: 1943

Dam and spillways
- Height: 17.1 m (56 ft)
- Length: 41.1 m (135 ft)

Reservoir
- Total capacity: 38,000 m^{3} (1,300,000 cu ft)
- Catchment area: sq. km
- Surface area: 0.4 hectares (0.99 acres)

Ohyama Oku-Ike Dam (Japanese: 大山奥池) is an earthfill dam located in Hiroshima Prefecture in Japan. The dam is used for irrigation. The dam impounds about 0.4 ha of land when full and can store 38 thousand cubic meters of water. The construction of the dam was completed in 1943.
