= Kanda-ohike Dam =

Dam in Hiroshima Prefecture, Japan

- Location within Japan
- Location: Hiroshima Prefecture, Japan
- Coordinates: 34°33′36″N 132°55′57″E
- Opening date: 1989

Dam and spillways
- Height: 22.3 m (73 ft)
- Length: 119 m (390 ft)

Reservoir
- Total capacity: 550 thousand cubic meters
- Catchment area: 8.4 sq. km
- Surface area: 5 hectares

Kanda-ohike Dam (Japanese: 神田大池) is an earthfill dam located in Hiroshima Prefecture in Japan. The dam is used for irrigation. The catchment area of the dam is 8.4 km^{2}. The dam impounds about 5 ha of land when full and can store 550 thousand cubic meters of water. The construction of the dam was completed in 1989.
