= Showa-ike Dam (Hiroshima) =

Dam in Hiroshima Prefecture, Japan

- Location within Japan
- Location: Hiroshima Prefecture, Japan
- Coordinates: 34°21′10″N 132°47′43″E
- Opening date: 1944

Dam and spillways
- Height: 18.1 m (59 ft)
- Length: 101 m (331 ft)

Reservoir
- Total capacity: 196,000 m^{3} (6,900,000 cu ft)
- Catchment area: 5.3 km^{2} (2.0 sq mi)
- Surface area: 3 hectares (7.4 acres)

Showa-ike Dam (Japanese: 昭和池) is an earthfill dam located in Hiroshima Prefecture in Japan. The dam is used for irrigation. The catchment area of the dam is 5.3 km^{2}. The dam impounds about 3 ha of land when full and can store 196 thousand cubic meters of water. The construction of the dam was completed in 1944.
