= List of dams in Shimane Prefecture =

The following is a list of dams in Shimane Prefecture, Japan.

== List ==
Name	Location	Started	Opened	Height	Length	Image	DiJ number
Aigawa Dam			1942	21.7 m (71 ft)	96 m (315 ft)		1721
Akada Shin Tameike Dam			1987	25.2 m (83 ft)	70 m (230 ft)		1711
Choshi Dam		1987	1999	39.7 m (130 ft)	185 m (607 ft)		2980
Fube Dam				55.9 m (183 ft)			1747
Fukahori Tameike Dam			1993	15 m (49 ft)	40 m (130 ft)		1727
Hamada Dam		1959	1962	58 m (190 ft)	184.3 m (605 ft)		
Hamada No.2 Dam		1990		97.8 m (321 ft)	218 m (715 ft)		3087
Hamahara Dam			1953	19 m (62 ft)	361.4 m (1,186 ft)		1731
Hatsumi Dam		1973		48.2 m (158 ft)	126 m (413 ft)		1753
Hiebara Dam		1980	2004	47.3 m (155 ft)	117 m (384 ft)		1760
Kakihara Tameike Dam			2009	23.9 m (78 ft)	178.6 m (586 ft)		1729
Kijima Dam			1956	63 m (207 ft)	250.9 m (823 ft)		1735
Kitsuka Dam		1959	1961	39 m (128 ft)	98 m (322 ft)		1739
Kiyotaki Dam		1971	1984	33.9 m (111 ft)	124.5 m (408 ft)		1752
Korigawa Dam							
Masudagawa Dam		1973	2005	48 m (157 ft)	169 m (554 ft)		1754
Minari Dam		1950	1953	42 m (138 ft)	109.7 m (360 ft)		1730
Mita Dam		1971	1978	26.8 m (88 ft)	105 m (344 ft)		
Miyama Tameike Dam			1987	15 m (49 ft)	24.5 m (80 ft)		1714
Nagami Dam			1961	20.2 m (66 ft)	57.5 m (189 ft)		1740
Obara Dam		1987	2010	90 m (300 ft)	440.8 m (1,446 ft)		2964
Onagami Dam		1974	2003	71.5 m (235 ft)	334 m (1,096 ft)		1756
Ohtani Dam		1954	1957	35 m (115 ft)	101 m (331 ft)		1736
Ohto Dam			1959	23.2 m (76 ft)	67.4 m (221 ft)		1738
Onbe Dam		1973	1990	63 m (207 ft)	177 m (581 ft)		1755
Sagadani Dam			1957	34.6 m (114 ft)	96 m (315 ft)		1737
Sakane Dam		1974	1992	50.6 m (166 ft)	157 m (515 ft)		1758
Sanbe Dam		1980	1996	54.5 m (179 ft)	140 m (460 ft)		1759
Sasakura Dam			1967	36.3 m (119 ft)	82.8 m (272 ft)		
Senbon Dam		1915	1918	15.8 m (52 ft)	109.1 m (358 ft)		3587
Shinmamushidani-ike Dam			1949	16 m (52 ft)	80 m (260 ft)		1726
Shiota Dam		1980	1988	39.7 m (130 ft)	88 m (289 ft)		1761
Shitsumi Dam		1983	2011	81 m (266 ft)			1762
Sufugawa Dam			1961	58 m (190 ft)	147 m (482 ft)		1741
Tonokawauchi Tameike Dam			1964	16 m (52 ft)	62 m (203 ft)		1744
Tsudagawa Dam			1975	28.7 m (94 ft)	83 m (272 ft)		1748
Ueno Tameike Dam			1964	15 m (49 ft)	50 m (160 ft)		1745
Yabaragawa Dam		1994		51.3 m (168 ft)	266.5 m (874 ft)		3236
Yamasa Dam		1970	1980	56 m (184 ft)	220 m (720 ft)		1751
Yato Dam		1970	1976	72 m (236 ft)	151 m (495 ft)		1749
Yodohara Ohtutumi Dam			1998	18.6 m (61 ft)	100 m (330 ft)		1716
Yuyanooku Tameike Dam			1981	18.4 m (60 ft)	50 m (160 ft)		1691

== See also ==
- Media related to Dams in Shimane prefecture at Wikimedia Commons
