= Gōnokawa River =

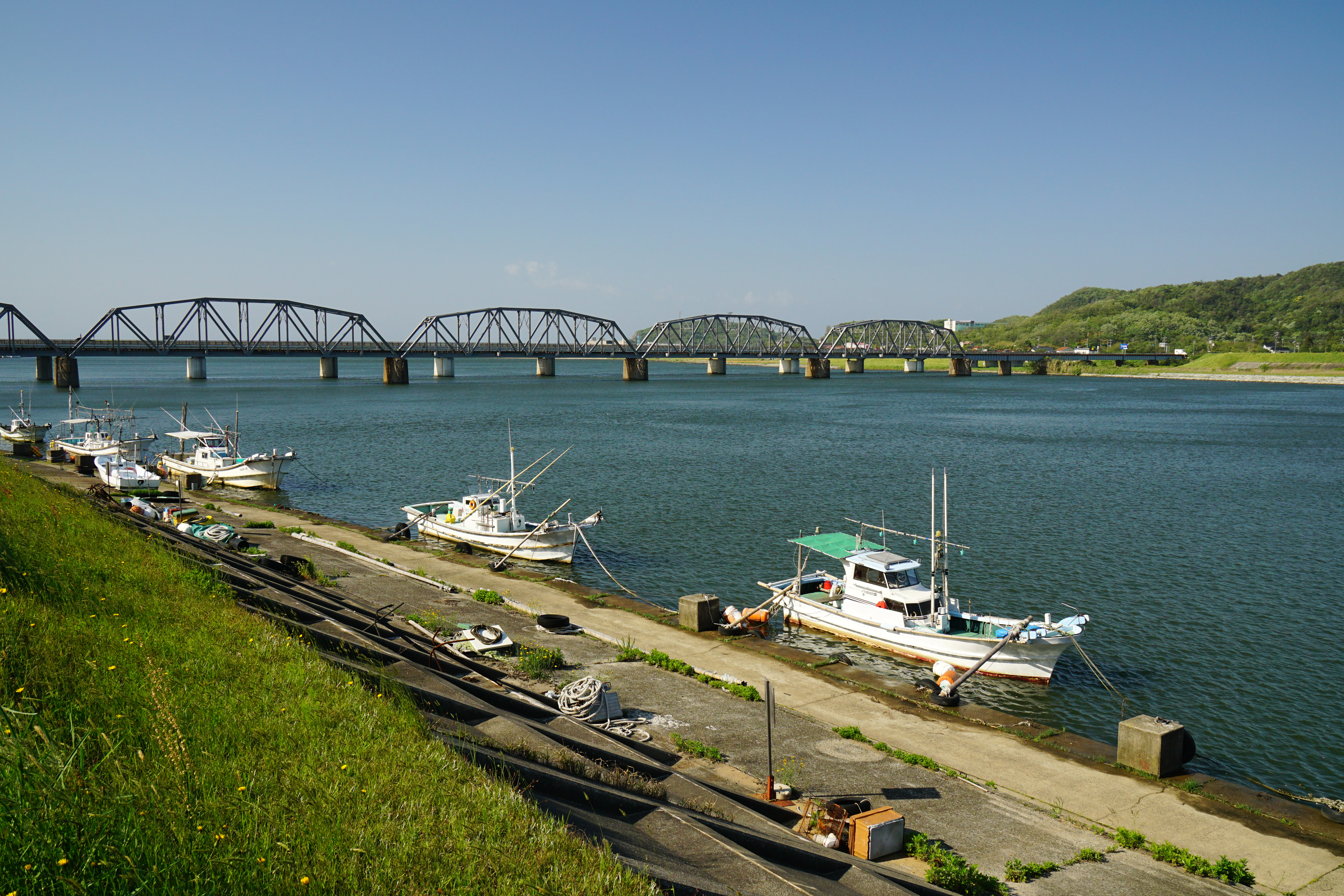
- Gōnokawa River in Gōtsu Shimane Prefecture

- Location within Japan
- Native name: 江の川(ごうのかわ/がわ) (Japanese); Gōnokawa (Japanese); Gōnogawa (Japanese); 江川(ごうかわ) (Japanese); Gōgawa (Japanese); 可愛川(えのかわ) (Japanese); Enogawa (Japanese)

Location
- Countries: Japan
- Prefecture: Shimane, Hiroshima

Physical characteristics
- Source: Mount Asa (阿佐山)
  - location: Kitahiroshima, Hiroshima
  - elevation: 1,218 m (3,996 ft)
- Mouth: Sea of Japan
  - location: Gōtsu, Shimane
  - coordinates: 35°01′32″N 132°13′37″E
- Length: 194 km (121 mi)
- Basin size: 3,900 km^{2} (1,500 sq mi) (Note: According to Encyclopedia Nipponica, the basin size of the river is 3,870 km^{2} (1,490 sq mi).)
- Discharge
  - location: Ozekiyama (尾関山)
  - average: 74.64 m^{3}/s (2,636 cu ft/s) (Note: Average from 1957 to 2003.)

Basin features
- Population: 278,207 (Note: Population as of 2000 based on the national census.)

The Gōnokawa River (Japanese: 江の川(ごうのかわ/がわ), Hepburn: Gōnokawa/Gōnogawa) is a Class A river that runs through Hiroshima and Shimane prefectures in Japan. It is the largest river in the Chūgoku region. It is also called the Gōgawa River (江川(ごうかわ)) and, in Hiroshima, the Enokawa River (可愛川(えのかわ)).

The mainstream originates from Mount Asa (阿佐山) located in Kitahiroshima, Hiroshima (former Geihoku). Its three tributaries including Basen River (馬洗川), Saijō River (西城川) and Kannose River (神野瀬川) flows into the mainstream in Miyoshi Basin. The gradients being relatively gentle, the river had been commonly used for boat transport until 1930s, when Sankō Line and trafficways were built and opened. There are some valleys and waterfalls such as Senjōkei, Dangyokei and Jōsei Falls around the region of the river.

It is known for ukai (鵜飼い) or cormorant fishing for ayu, which can be found especially in Miyoshi. According to one theory ukai in Miyoshi has taken place since late Sengoku Period, and is now one of the tourist attractions of the city.

== Communities ==
Reaches（0:Headwaters、0-1:Upper、1-2:Mid、2-3:Lower）

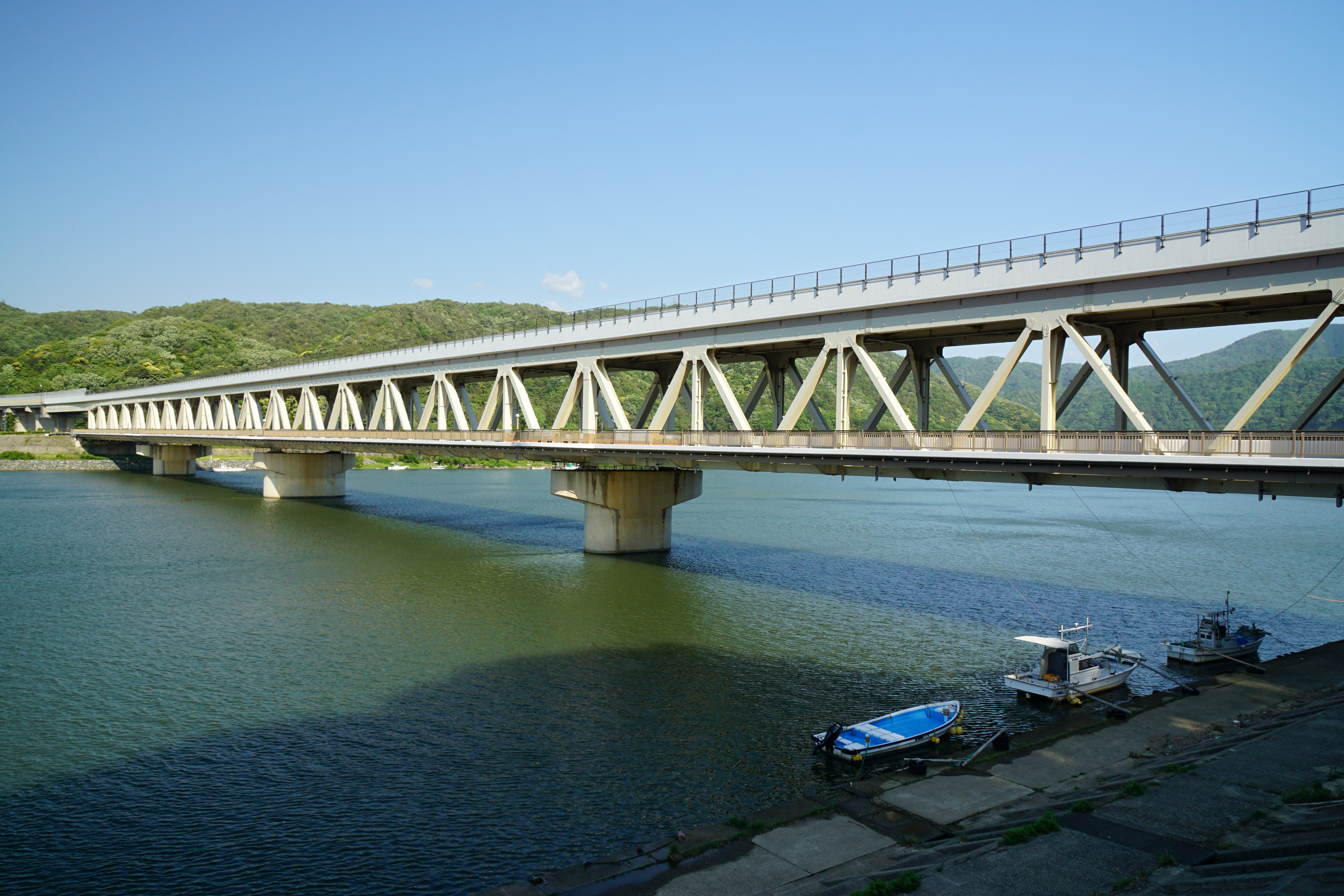
Gōtsu Bypass in Gōtsu, Shimane

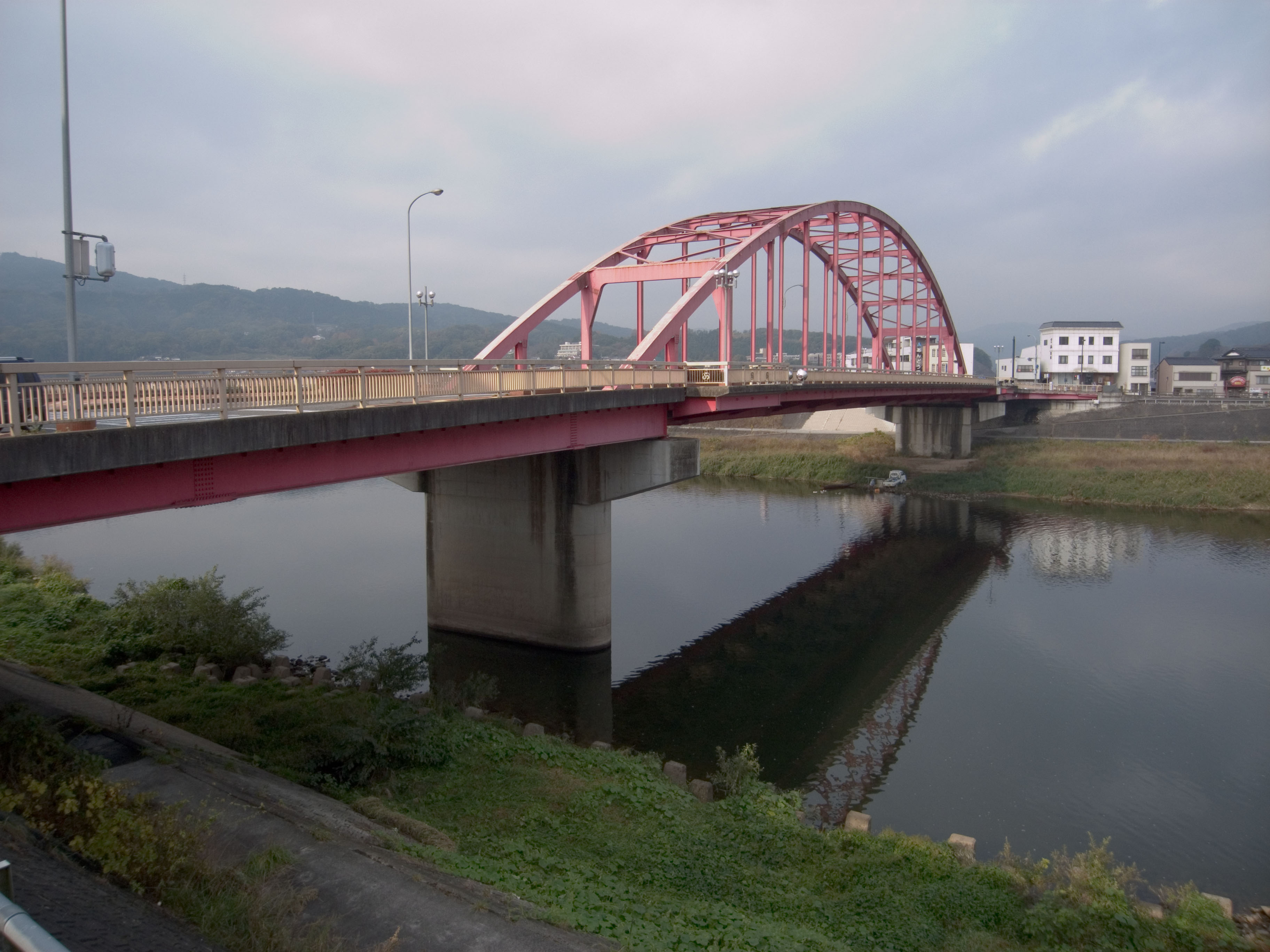
The Tomoe Bridge over the Basen River in Miyoshi, Hiroshima

The river and its tributaries pass through or borders eight cities and seven towns that are located in Shimane Prefecture and Hiroshima Prefecture as is shown below. As of 2000 according to the national census 278,207 people lived in the drainage basin, including 104,169 from Shimane and 174,038 from Hiroshima.

Hiroshima Prefecture
Kitahiroshima, Akitakata, Higashihiroshima, Sera, Jinsekikogen, Fuchu, Shōbara, Miyoshi
Shimane Prefecture
Ōnan, Misato, Iinan, Kawamoto, Ōda, Hamada, Gōtsu

== Dams ==
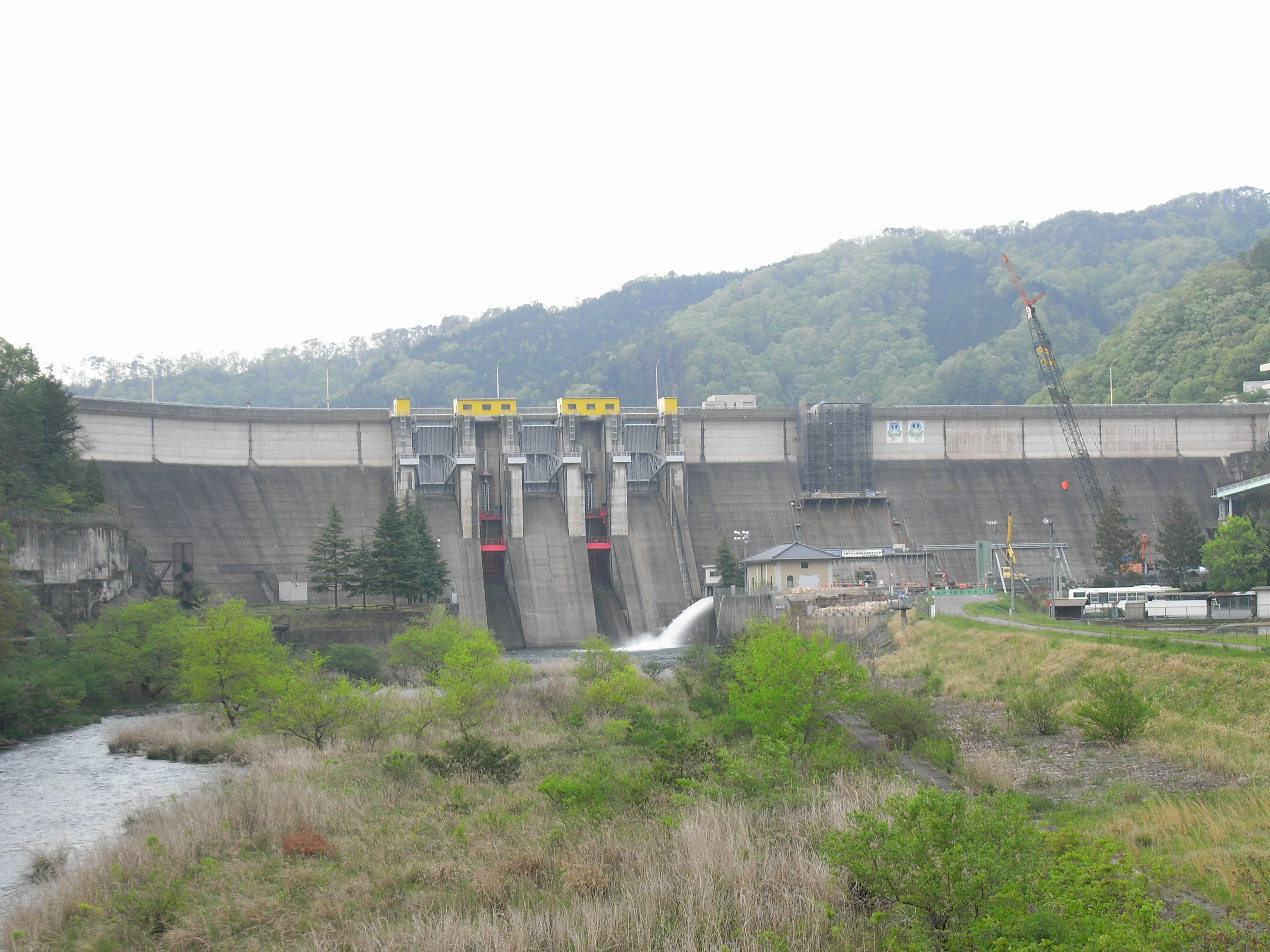
Haji Dam (May 2007)

Major dams located within the basin are shown below.

- Haji Dam - located in Akitakata, Hiroshima. Water in the reservoir is supplied to Ōta River that flows into Seto Inland Sea through a tunnel under the dividing ridge. The reservoir is selected as Selected 100 Dam Lakes of Japan, and the lakeside is noted for the cherry blossoms.
- Kōbo Dam - located on Kannose River, one of the tributaries, in Takano, Hiroshima.
- Kutsugahara Dam - located on Kannose River in Kimita, Hiroshima.
- Haizuka Dam - located on Jōge River (上下川), one of the tributaries, in Mirasaka, Hiroshima.
- Hamahara Dam - located in Misato, Shimane.

== Notes ==
References
