= Haji Dam =

Dam in Hiroshima, Japan

Coordinates: 34°38′37″N 132°37′16″E

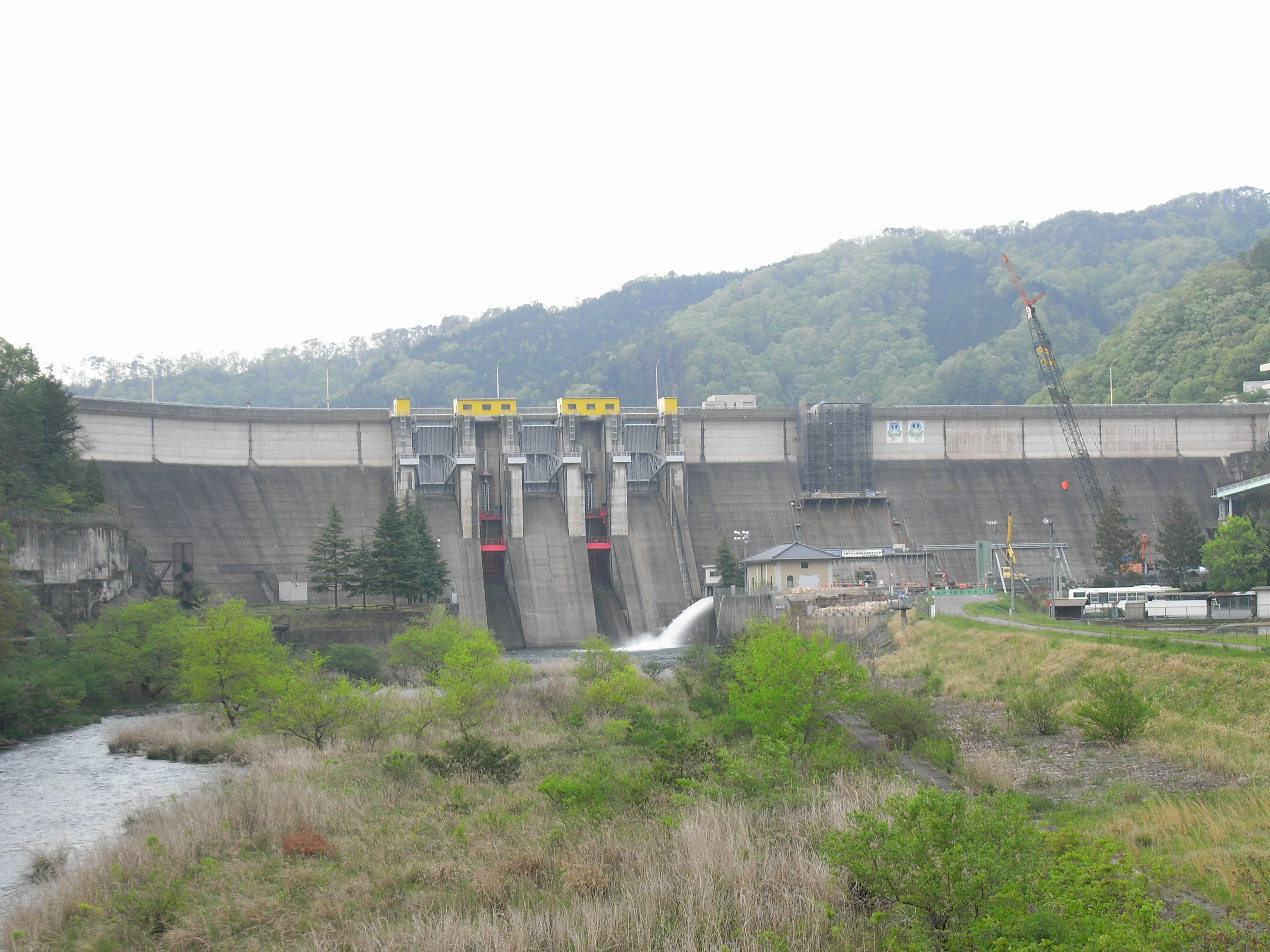
- Interactive map of Haji Dam
- Location: Akitakata, Hiroshima, Japan.
- Construction began: 1966
- Opening date: 1974

Dam and spillways
- Impounds: Gōnokawa River
- Height: 50 m
- Length: 300 m

Reservoir
- Total capacity: 47,300,000 m^{3}
- Catchment area: 307.5 km^{2}
- Surface area: 280 hectares

Haji Dam (土師ダム, Haji damu) is a dam in Akitakata, Hiroshima Prefecture, Japan.
