= Hamada Dam =

Dam in Shimane Prefecture, Japan

- Location within Japan
- Interactive map of Hamada Dam
- Location: Shimane Prefecture, Japan
- Coordinates: 34°51′58″N 132°7′10″E
- Construction began: 1959
- Opening date: 1962

Dam and spillways
- Height: 58 m (190 ft)
- Length: 184.3 m (605 ft)

Reservoir
- Total capacity: 5000 thousand cubic meters
- Catchment area: 33.8 sq. km
- Surface area: 27 hectares

Hamada Dam is a gravity dam located in Shimane Prefecture in Japan. The dam is used for flood control and power production. The catchment area of the dam is 33.8 km^{2}. The dam impounds about 27 ha of land when full and can store 5000 thousand cubic meters of water. The construction of the dam was started on 1959 and completed in 1962.
