= Ohnagami Dam =

Dam in Shimane Prefecture, Japan

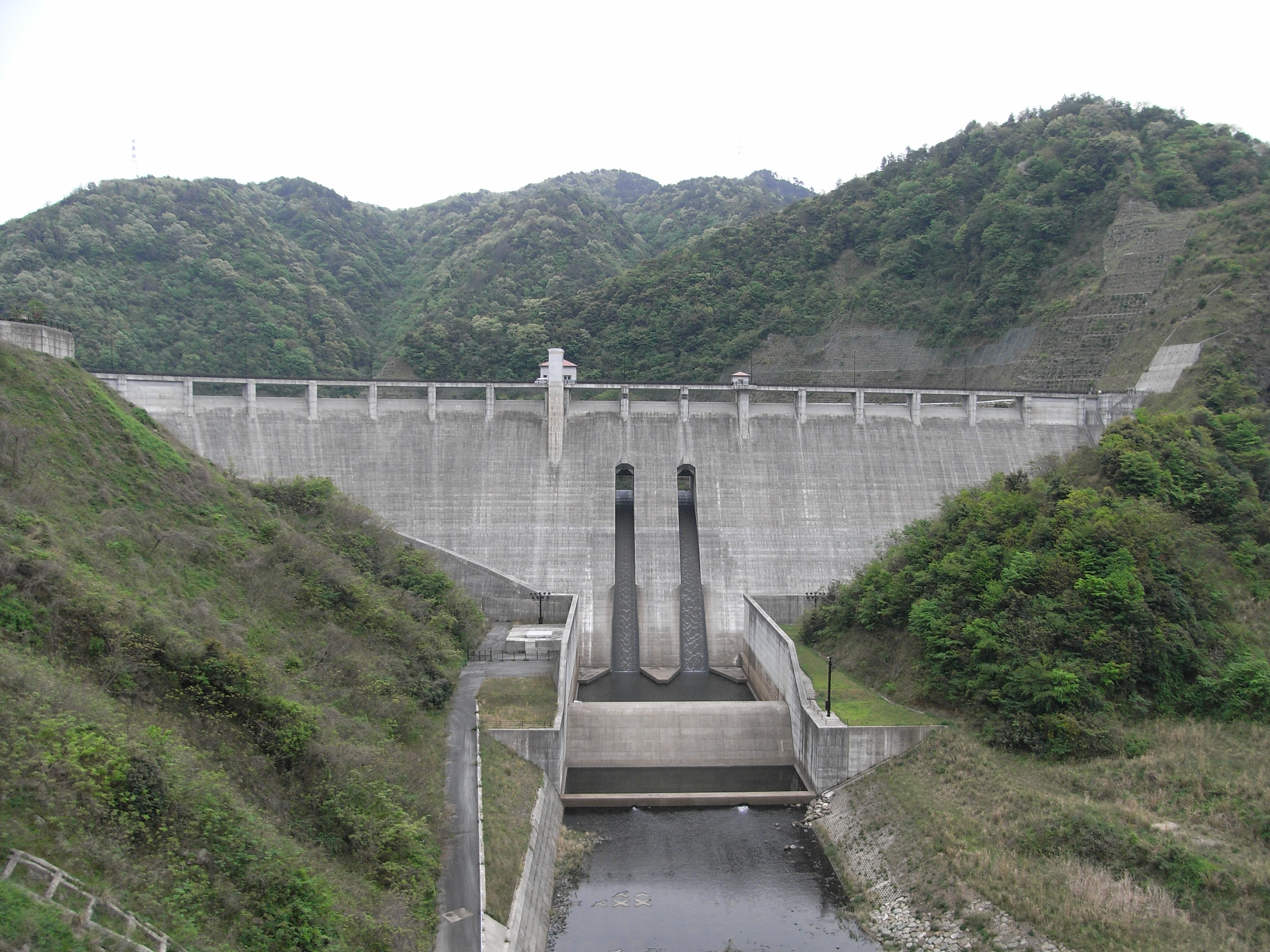

- Location within Japan
- Location: Shimane Prefecture, Japan
- Coordinates: 34°49′39″N 132°6′33″E
- Construction began: 1974
- Opening date: 2003

Dam and spillways
- Height: 71.5 m (235 ft)
- Length: 334 m (1,096 ft)

Reservoir
- Total capacity: 19,270,000 m^{3} (681,000,000 cu ft)
- Catchment area: 106.2 km^{2} (41.0 sq mi)
- Surface area: 90 hectares (220 acres)

Ohnagami Dam is a gravity dam located in Shimane Prefecture in Japan. The dam is used for flood control and water supply. The catchment area of the dam is 106.2 km^{2}. The dam impounds about 90 ha of land when full and can store 19270 thousand cubic meters of water. The construction of the dam was started on 1974 and completed in 2003.
