= Shinmamushidani-ike Dam =

Dam in Shimane Prefecture, Japan

- Location within Japan
- Location: Shimane Prefecture, Japan
- Coordinates: 35°25′20″N 133°5′11″E
- Opening date: 1949

Dam and spillways
- Height: 16 m (52 ft)
- Length: 80 m (260 ft)

Reservoir
- Total capacity: 99,000 m^{3} (3,500,000 cu ft)
- Catchment area: 0.3 km^{2} (0.12 sq mi)
- Surface area: 1 hectare (2.5 acres)

Shinmamushidani-ike Dam is an earthfill dam located in Shimane Prefecture in Japan. The dam is used for irrigation. The catchment area of the dam is 0.3 km^{2}. The dam impounds about 1 ha of land when full and can store 99 thousand cubic meters of water. The construction of the dam was completed in 1949.
