= Hiebara Dam =

Dam in Shimane Prefecture, Japan

- Location within Japan
- Interactive map of Hiebara Dam
- Location: Shimane Prefecture, Japan
- Coordinates: 35°16′59″N 132°47′59″E
- Construction began: 1980
- Opening date: 2004

Dam and spillways
- Height: 47.3 m (155 ft)
- Length: 117 m (384 ft)

Reservoir
- Total capacity: 1210 thousand cubic meters
- Catchment area: 4.6 sq. km
- Surface area: 9 hectares

Hiebara Dam is a gravity dam located in Shimane Prefecture in Japan. The dam is used for irrigation. The catchment area of the dam is 4.6 km^{2}. The dam impounds about 9 ha of land when full and can store 1210 thousand cubic meters of water. The construction of the dam was started on 1980 and completed in 2004.
