= Sagadani Dam =

Dam in Shimane Prefecture, Japan

- Location within Japan
- Location: Shimane Prefecture, Japan
- Coordinates: 34°38′51″N 131°59′53″E
- Opening date: 1957

Dam and spillways
- Height: 34.6 m (114 ft)
- Length: 96 m (315 ft)

Reservoir
- Total capacity: 828,000 m^{3} (29,200,000 cu ft)
- Catchment area: 16.8 km^{2} (6.5 sq mi)
- Surface area: 7 hectares (17 acres)

Sagadani Dam is a gravity dam located in Shimane Prefecture in Japan. The dam is used for flood control. The catchment area of the dam is 16.8 km^{2}. The dam impounds about 7 ha of land when full and can store 828 thousand cubic meters of water. The construction of the dam was completed in 1957.
