= Akada Shin Tameike Dam =

Dam in Shimane Prefecture, Japan

- Location within Japan
- Location: Shimane Prefecture, Japan
- Coordinates: 35°31′33″N 133°2′08″E
- Opening date: 1987

Dam and spillways
- Height: 25.2 m (83 ft)
- Length: 70 m (230 ft)

Reservoir
- Total capacity: 138 thousand cubic meters
- Catchment area: 13 sq. km
- Surface area: 2 hectares

Akada Shin Tameike Dam is an earthfill dam located in Shimane Prefecture in Japan. The dam is used for irrigation. The catchment area of the dam is 13 km^{2}. The dam impounds about 2 ha of land when full and can store 138 thousand cubic meters of water. The construction of the dam was completed in 1987.
