= Hatsumi Dam =

Dam in Shimane Prefecture, Japan

- Location within Japan
- Interactive map of Hatsumi Dam
- Location: Shimane Prefecture, Japan
- Coordinates: 35°2′00″N 132°20′39″E
- Construction began: 1973

Dam and spillways
- Height: 48.2 m (158 ft)
- Length: 126 m (413 ft)

Reservoir
- Total capacity: 3720 thousand cubic meters
- Catchment area: 13.5 sq. km
- Surface area: 24 hectares

Hatsumi Dam is a gravity dam located in Shimane Prefecture in Japan. The dam is used for flood control. The catchment area of the dam is 13.5 km^{2}. The dam impounds about 24 ha of land when full and can store 3720 thousand cubic meters of water. The construction of the dam was done during 1973.
