= Miyama Tameike Dam =

Dam in Shimane Prefecture, Japan

- Location within Japan
- Location: Shimane Prefecture, Japan
- Coordinates: 35°13′41″N 132°33′08″E
- Opening date: 1987

Dam and spillways
- Height: 15 m (49 ft)
- Length: 24.5 m (80 ft)

Reservoir
- Total capacity: 80 thousand cubic meters
- Catchment area: 2.5 sq. km
- Surface area: 1 hectares

Miyama Tameike Dam is a gravity dam located in Shimane Prefecture in Japan. The dam is used for irrigation. The catchment area of the dam is 2.5 km^{2}. The dam impounds about 1 ha of land when full and can store 80 thousand cubic meters of water. The construction of the dam was completed in 1987.
