= Kitsuka Dam =

Dam in Shimane Prefecture, Japan

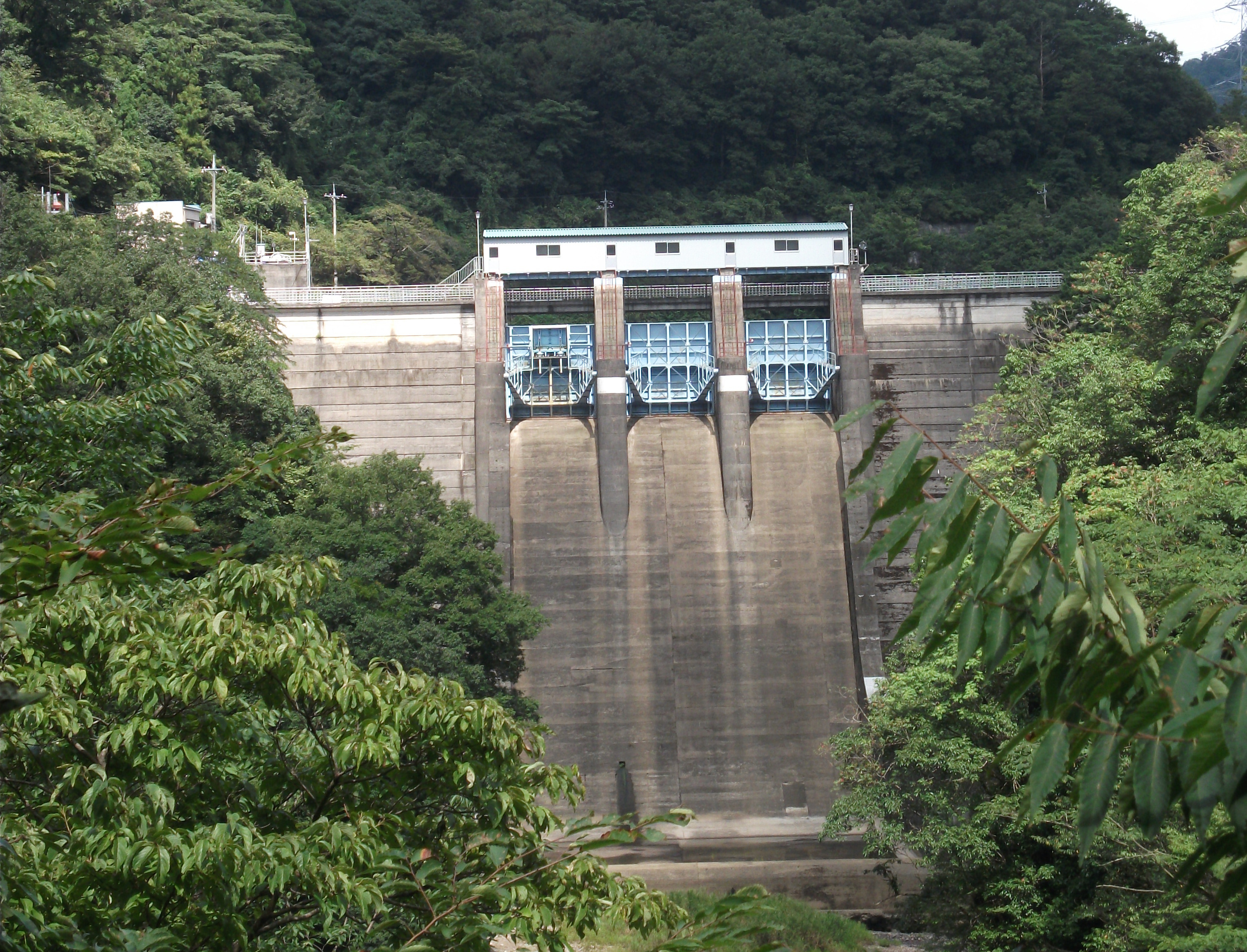

- Location within Japan
- Location: Shimane Prefecture, Japan
- Coordinates: 34°45′03″N 132°4′12″E
- Construction began: 1959
- Opening date: 1961

Dam and spillways
- Height: 39 m (128 ft)
- Length: 98 m (322 ft)

Reservoir
- Total capacity: 2526 thousand cubic meters
- Catchment area: 62 sq. km
- Surface area: 20 hectares

Kitsuka Dam is a gravity dam located in Shimane Prefecture in Japan. The dam is used for power production. The catchment area of the dam is 62 km^{2}. The dam impounds about 20 ha of land when full and can store 2526 thousand cubic meters of water. The construction of the dam was started on 1959 and completed in 1961.
