= Chosi Dam =

Dam in Shimane Prefecture, Japan

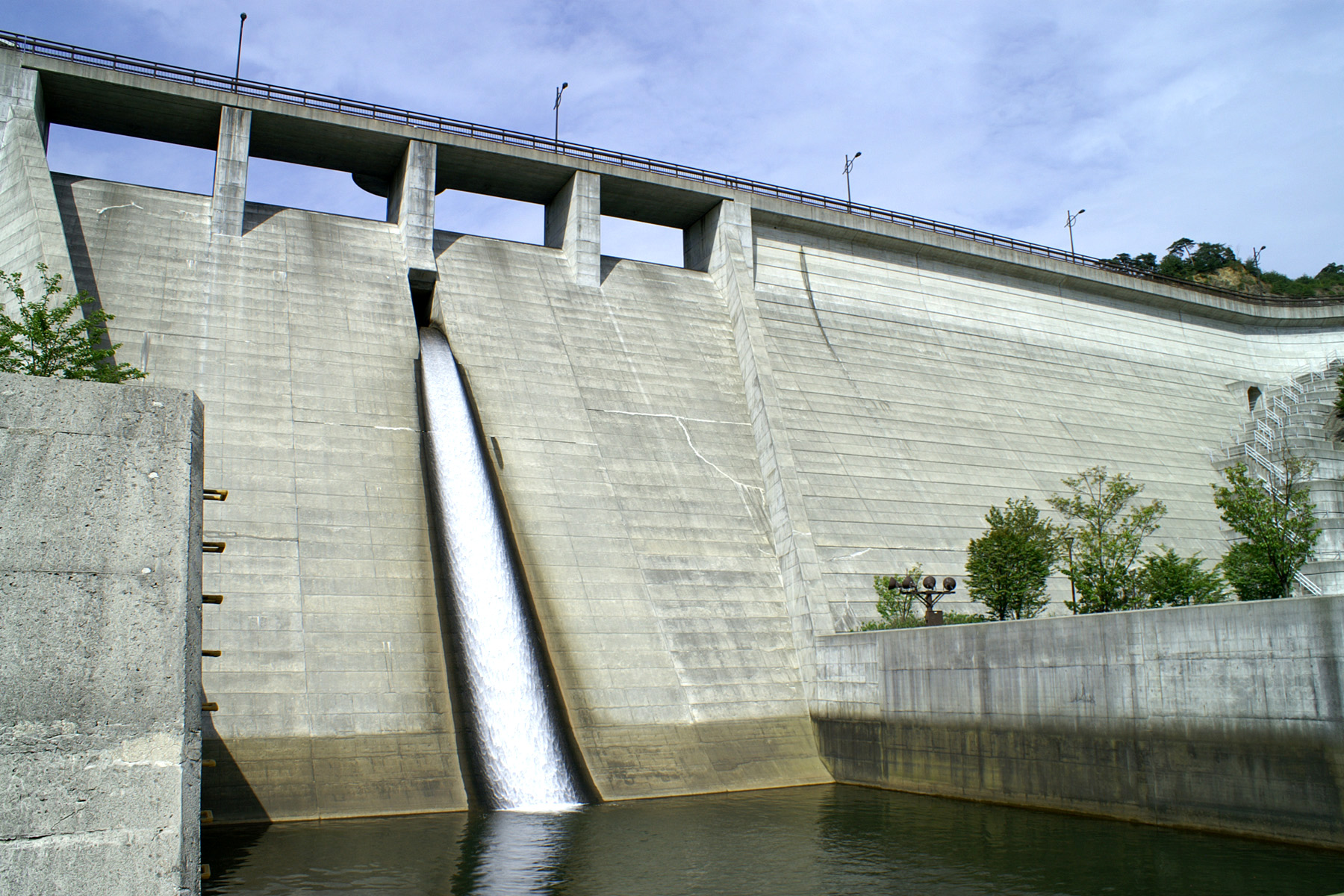

- Location within Japan
- Interactive map of Chosi Dam
- Location: Shimane Prefecture, Japan
- Coordinates: 36°14′39″N 133°18′16″E
- Construction began: 1987
- Opening date: 1999

Dam and spillways
- Height: 39.7 m (130 ft)
- Length: 185 m (607 ft)

Reservoir
- Total capacity: 2530 thousand cubic meters
- Catchment area: 7.8 sq. km
- Surface area: 20 hectares

Chosi Dam is a gravity dam located in Shimane Prefecture in Japan. The dam is used for flood control and water supply. The catchment area of the dam is 7.8 km^{2}. The dam impounds about 20 ha of land when full and can store 2530 thousand cubic meters of water. The construction of the dam was started on 1987 and completed in 1999.
