= Minari Dam =

Dam in Shimane Prefecture, Japan

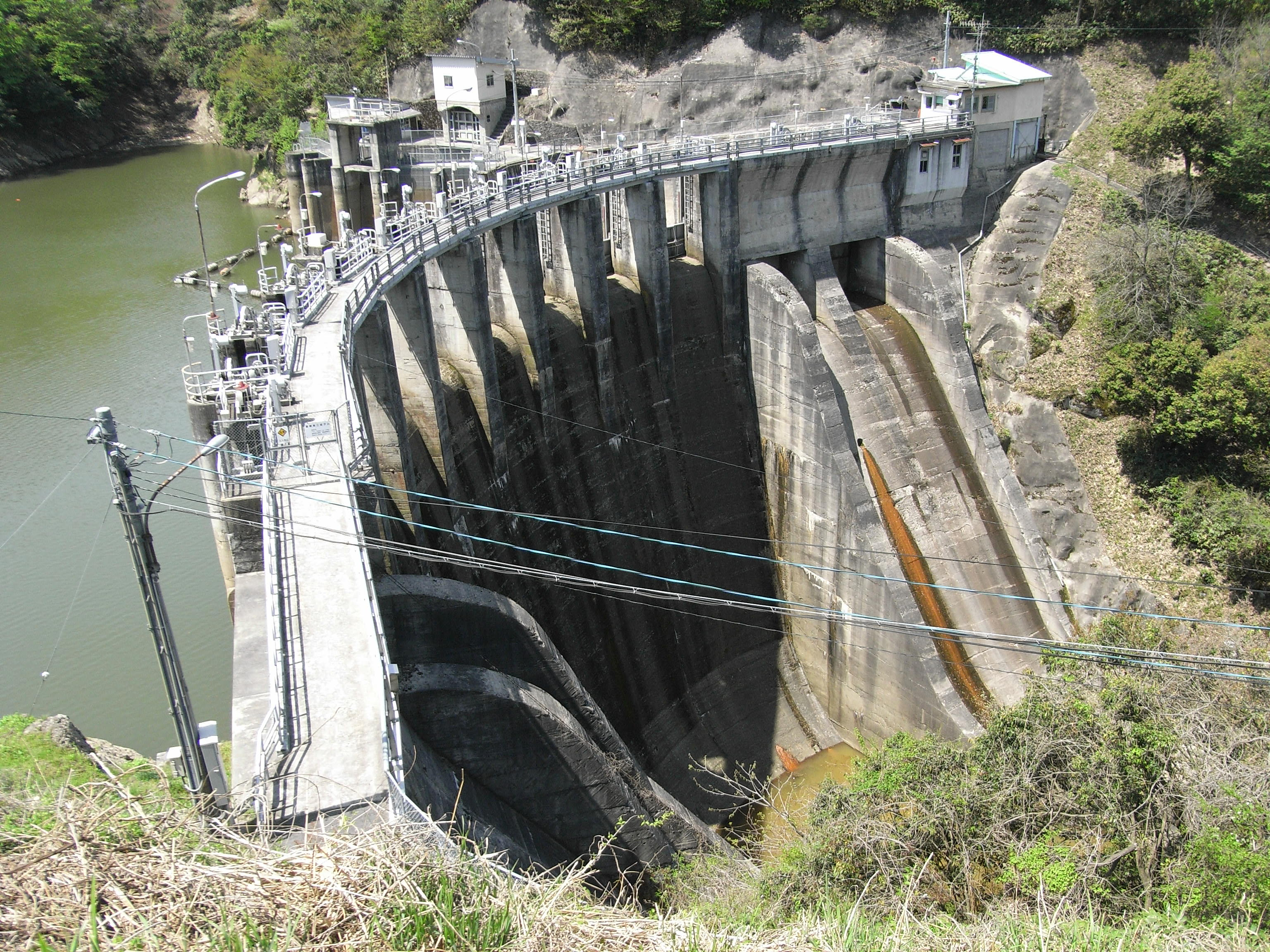

- Location within Japan
- Location: Shimane Prefecture, Japan
- Coordinates: 35°11′24″N 133°2′30″E
- Construction began: 1950
- Opening date: 1953

Dam and spillways
- Height: 42 m (138 ft)
- Length: 109.7 m (360 ft)

Reservoir
- Total capacity: 3438 thousand cubic meters
- Catchment area: 117.5 sq. km
- Surface area: 32 hectares

Minari Dam is an arch dam located in Shimane Prefecture in Japan. The dam is used for power production. The catchment area of the dam is 117.5 km^{2}. The dam impounds about 32 ha of land when full and can store 3438 thousand cubic meters of water. The construction of the dam was started on 1950 and completed in 1953.
