= Ohtani Dam =

Ohtani Dam may refer to:

- Ohtani Dam (Kumamoto)
- Ohtani Dam (Shimane)
