= Kijima Dam =

Dam in Shimane Prefecture, Japan

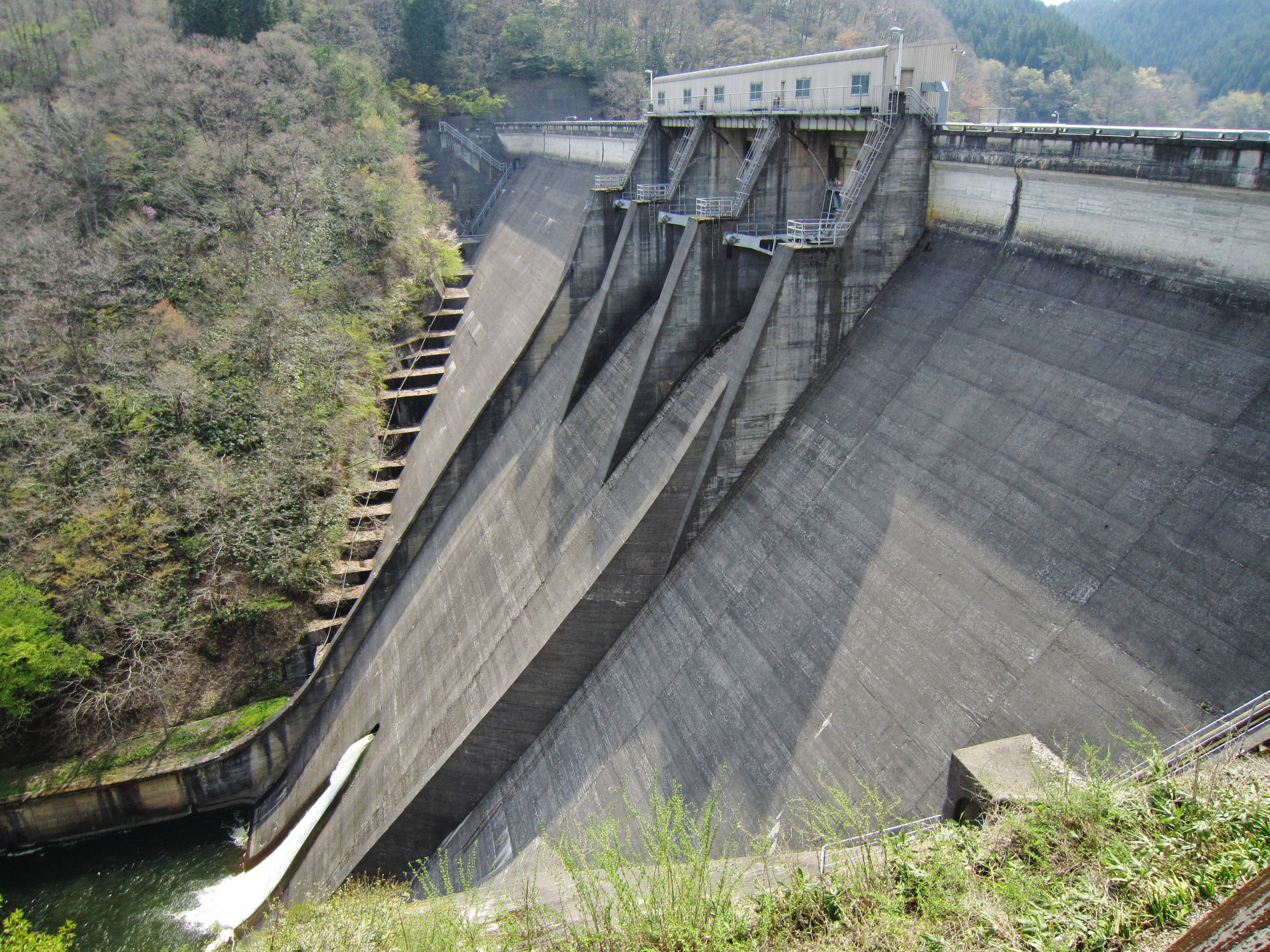

- Location within Japan
- Location: Shimane Prefecture, Japan
- Coordinates: 35°5′14″N 132°43′26″E
- Opening date: 1956

Dam and spillways
- Height: 63 m (207 ft)
- Length: 250.9 m (823 ft)

Reservoir
- Total capacity: 23470 thousand cubic meters
- Catchment area: 140.2 sq. km
- Surface area: 160 hectares

Kijima Dam is a gravity dam located in Shimane Prefecture in Japan. The dam is used for power production. The catchment area of the dam is 140.2 km^{2}. The dam impounds about 160 ha of land when full and can store 23470 thousand cubic meters of water. The construction of the dam was completed in 1956.
