= Shiota Dam =

Dam in Shimane Prefecture, Japan

- Location within Japan
- Location: Shimane Prefecture, Japan
- Coordinates: 35°16′57″N 133°0′54″E
- Construction began: 1980
- Opening date: 1988

Dam and spillways
- Height: 39.7 m (130 ft)
- Length: 88 m (289 ft)

Reservoir
- Total capacity: 310,000 m^{3} (11,000,000 cu ft)
- Catchment area: 1.3 km^{2} (0.50 sq mi)
- Surface area: 3 hectares (7.4 acres)

Shiota Dam is a gravity dam located in Shimane Prefecture in Japan. The dam is used for irrigation. The catchment area of the dam is 1.3 km^{2}. The dam impounds about 3 ha of land when full and can store 310 thousand cubic meters of water. The construction of the dam was started on 1980 and completed in 1988.
