= Kiyotaki Dam =

Dam in Shimane Prefecture, Japan

- Location within Japan
- Location: Shimane Prefecture, Japan
- Coordinates: 35°12′46″N 132°31′21″E
- Construction began: 1971
- Opening date: 1984

Dam and spillways
- Height: 33.9 m (111 ft)
- Length: 124.5 m (408 ft)

Reservoir
- Total capacity: 835 thousand cubic meters
- Catchment area: 6.9 sq. km
- Surface area: 9 hectares

Kiyotaki Dam is an earthfill dam located in Shimane Prefecture in Japan. The dam is used for flood control. The catchment area of the dam is 6.9 km (4.3 mi)^{2}. The dam impounds about 9 ha (22 acres) of land when full and can store 835,000 m (2,740,000 ft)^{3} of water. The construction of the dam began in 1971 and was completed in 1984.
