= Kakihara Tameike Dam =

Dam in Shimane Prefecture, Japan

- Location within Japan
- Interactive map of Kakihara Tameike Dam
- Location: Shimane Prefecture, Japan
- Coordinates: 35°29′43″N 133°0′12″E
- Opening date: 2009

Dam and spillways
- Height: 23.9 m (78 ft)
- Length: 178.6 m (586 ft)

Reservoir
- Total capacity: 1290 thousand cubic meters
- Catchment area: 1 sq. km
- Surface area: 18 hectares

Kakihara Tameike Dam is an earthfill dam located in Shimane Prefecture in Japan. The dam is used for irrigation. The catchment area of the dam is 1 km^{2}. The dam impounds about 18 ha of land when full and can store 1290 thousand cubic meters of water. The construction of the dam was completed in 2009.
