= Yabaragawa Dam =

Dam in Shimane Prefecture, Japan

- Location within Japan
- Location: Shimane Prefecture, Japan
- Coordinates: 34°43′16″N 131°59′08″E
- Construction began: 1994

Dam and spillways
- Height: 51.3 m (168 ft)
- Length: 266.5 m (874 ft)

Reservoir
- Total capacity: 7,000,000 m^{3} (250,000,000 cu ft)
- Catchment area: 47.6 km^{2} (18.4 sq mi)
- Surface area: 42 hectares (100 acres)

Yabaragawa Dam is a gravity dam located in Shimane Prefecture in Japan. The dam is used for flood control. The catchment area of the dam is 47.6 km^{2}. The dam impounds about 42 ha of land when full and can store 7,000 thousand cubic meters of water. The construction of the dam was done during 1994.
