= Kōbo Dam =

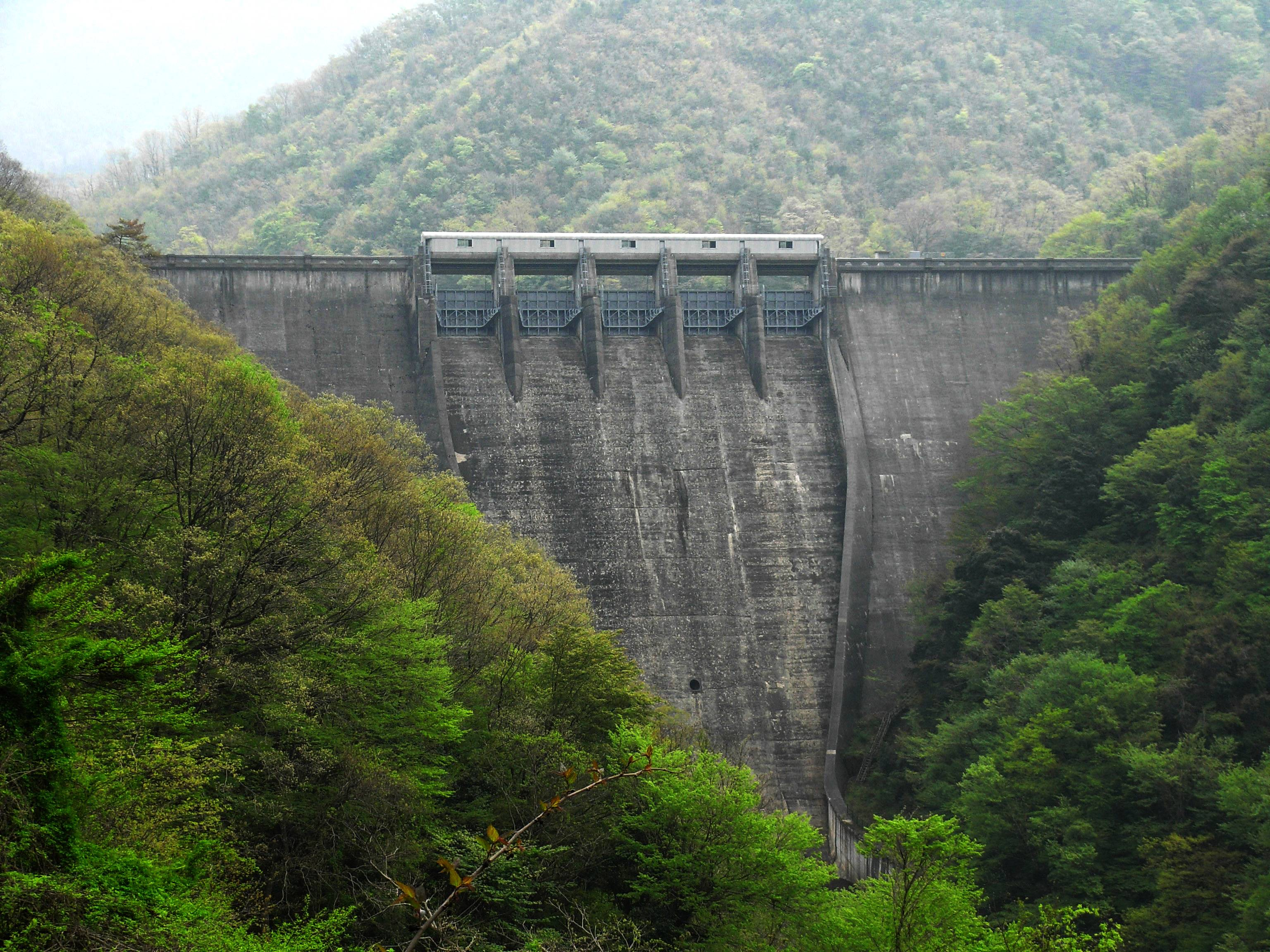
- Location: Hiroshima Prefecture, Japan
- Coordinates: 34°59′39.0″N 132°47′36.0″E
- Construction began: 1940
- Opening date: 1949

Dam and spillways
- Impounds: Kaminose River
- Height: 69.4 m
- Length: 195.7 m

Reservoir
- Total capacity: 39,658,000 m^{3}
- Catchment area: 161.9 km^{2}
- Surface area: 185 hectares

Kōbo Dam (高暮ダム) is a dam in Hiroshima Prefecture, Japan.

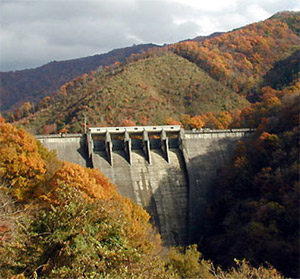
