= Onbe Dam =

Dam in Shimane Prefecture, Japan

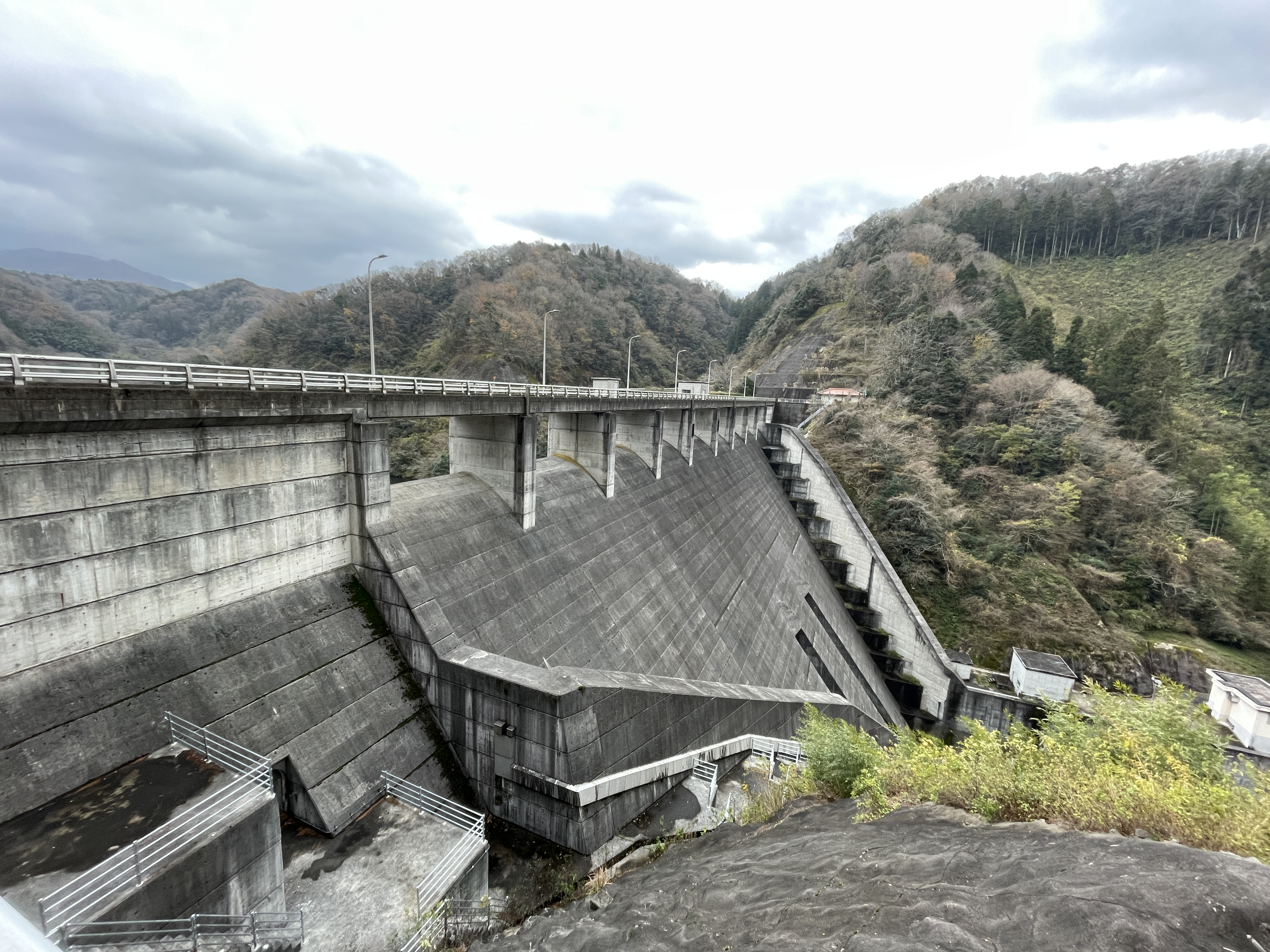

- Location within Japan
- Location: Shimane Prefecture, Japan
- Coordinates: 34°43′19″N 132°1′53″E
- Construction began: 1973
- Opening date: 1990

Dam and spillways
- Height: 63 m (207 ft)
- Length: 177 m (581 ft)

Reservoir
- Total capacity: 16,800,000 m^{3} (590,000,000 cu ft)
- Catchment area: 102.4 km^{2} (39.5 sq mi)
- Surface area: 104 hectares (260 acres)

Onbe Dam is a gravity dam located in Shimane Prefecture in Japan. The dam is used for flood control and power production. The catchment area of the dam is 102.4 km^{2}. The dam impounds about 104 ha of land when full and can store 16800 thousand cubic meters of water. The construction of the dam was started on 1973 and completed in 1990.
