= Mita Dam =

Dam in Shimane Prefecture, Japan

- Location within Japan
- Location: Shimane Prefecture, Japan
- Coordinates: 36°5′47″N 133°1′20″E
- Construction began: 1971
- Opening date: 1978

Dam and spillways
- Height: 26.8 m (88 ft)
- Length: 105 m (344 ft)

Reservoir
- Total capacity: 391 thousand cubic meters
- Catchment area: 2.2 sq. km
- Surface area: 4 hectares

Mita Dam is a gravity dam located in Shimane Prefecture in Japan. The dam is used for flood control and water supply. The catchment area of the dam is 2.2 km^{2}. The dam impounds about 4 ha of land when full and can store 391 thousand cubic meters of water. The construction of the dam was started on 1971 and completed in 1978.
