= Obara Dam =

Dam in Shimane Prefecture, Japan

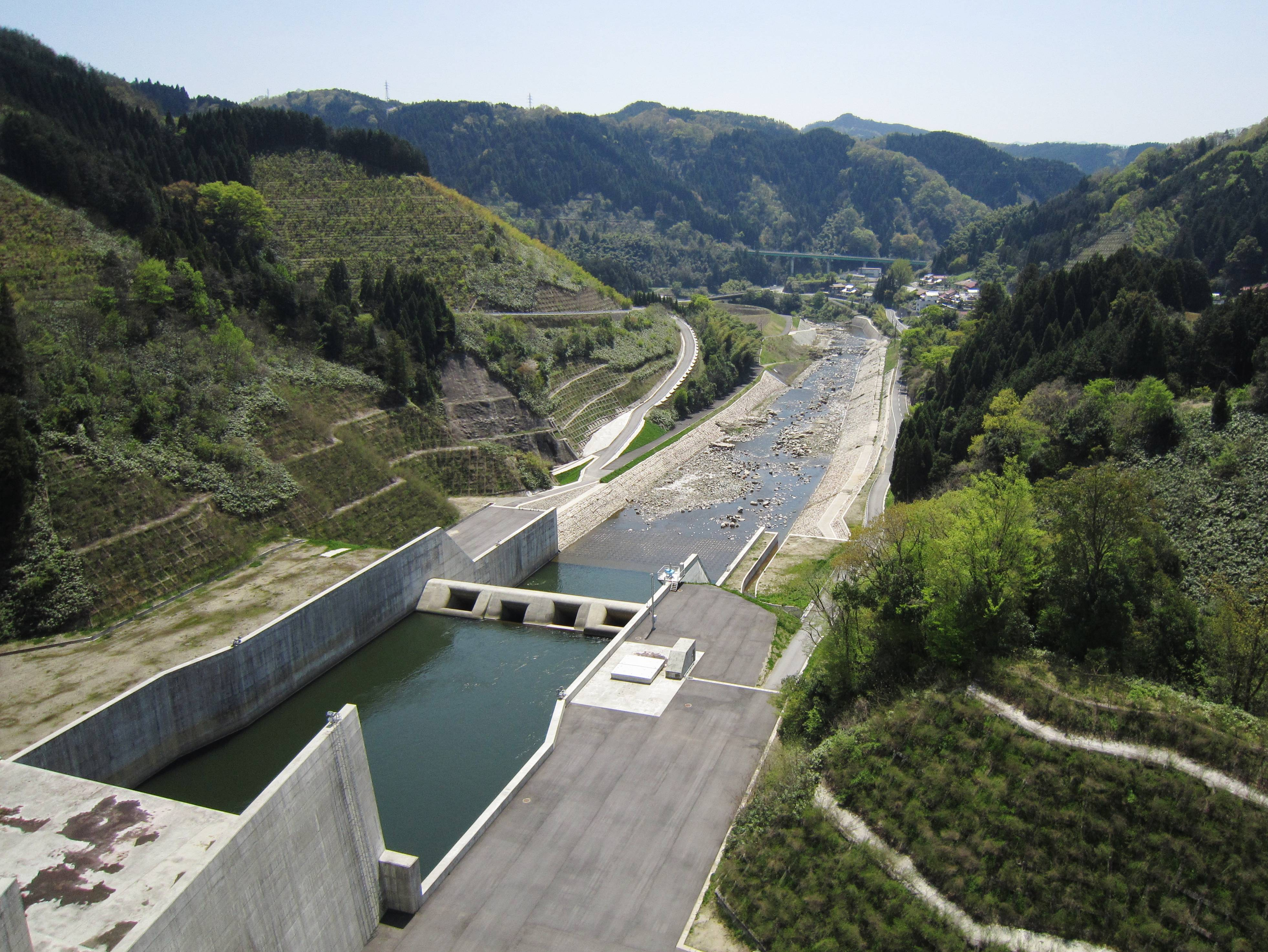

- Location within Japan
- Location: Shimane Prefecture, Japan
- Coordinates: 35°13′29″N 132°57′04″E
- Construction began: 1987
- Opening date: 2010

Dam and spillways
- Height: 90 m (300 ft)
- Length: 440.8 m (1,446 ft)

Reservoir
- Total capacity: 60,800,000 m^{3} (2.15×10^{9} cu ft)
- Catchment area: 289 km^{2} (112 sq mi)
- Surface area: 230 hectares (570 acres)

Obara Dam is a gravity dam located in Shimane Prefecture in Japan. The dam is used for flood control and water supply. The catchment area of the dam is 289 km^{2}. The dam impounds about 230 ha of land when full and can store 60800 thousand cubic meters of water. The construction of the dam was started on 1987 and completed in 2010.

== Innovative engineering ==
=== Underwater discharge system ===
To minimize noise and vibration during water release, Obara Dam employs Japan's first underwater discharge method for flood control, directing water into a stilling basin.

=== Selective siphon intake ===
The dam utilizes a pioneering continuous siphon intake system, allowing for water temperature regulation without traditional gates, thereby reducing maintenance and costs. It is the first dam in Japan to utilize this technique.
