= Aigawa Dam =

Dam in Shimane Prefecture, Japan

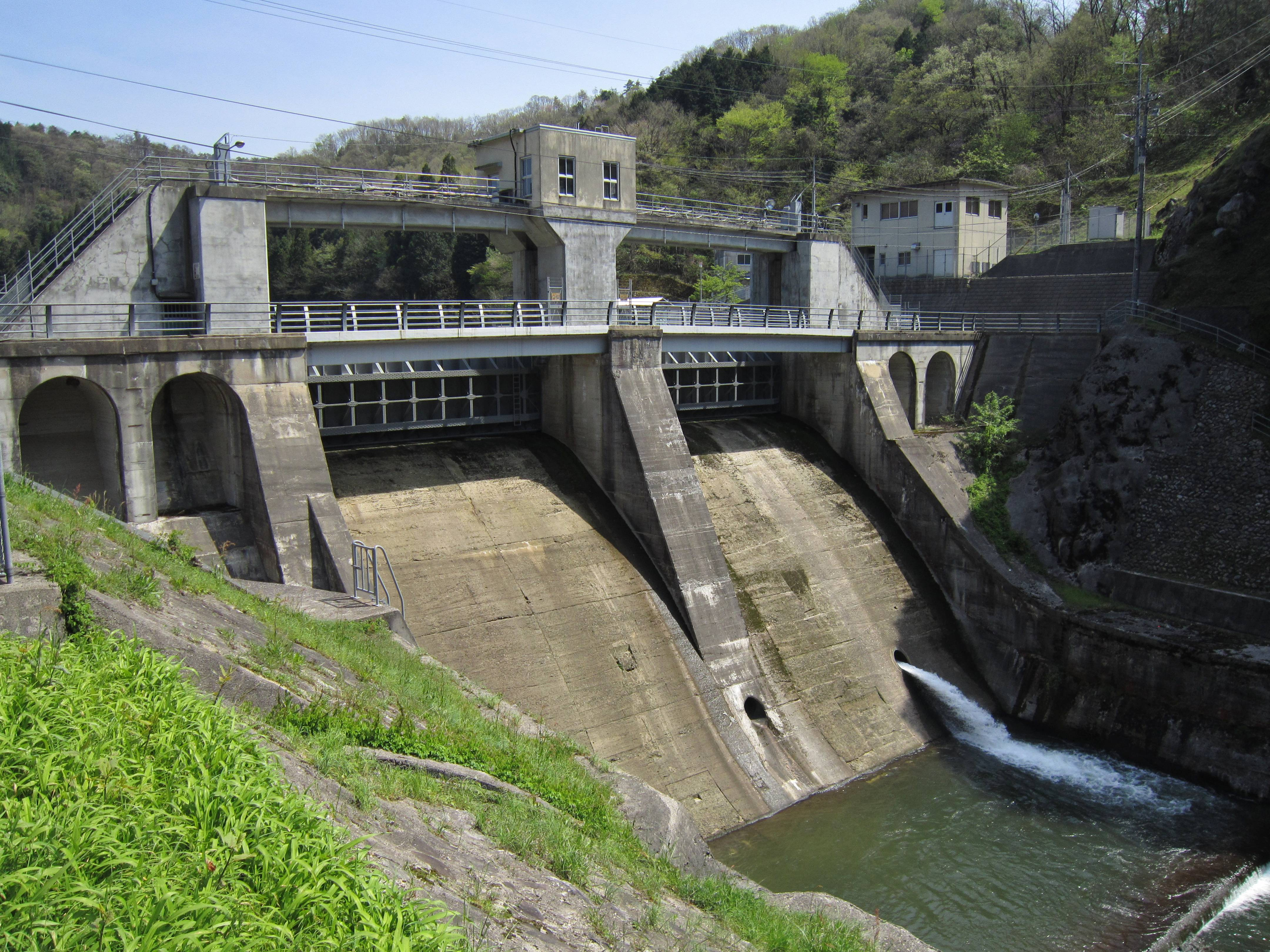

- Location within Japan
- Location: Shimane Prefecture, Japan
- Coordinates: 35°11′34″N 132°57′43″E
- Opening date: 1942

Dam and spillways
- Height: 21.7 m (71 ft)
- Length: 96 m (315 ft)

Reservoir
- Total capacity: 1085 thousand cubic meters
- Catchment area: 333.2 km^{2}
- Surface area: 16 hectares

Aigawa Dam is a gravity dam located in Shimane Prefecture in Japan. The dam is used for power production. The catchment area of the dam is 333.2 km^{2}. The dam impounds about 16 ha of land when full and can store 1085 thousand cubic meters of water. The construction of the dam was completed in 1942.
