= Yodohara Ohtutumi Dam =

Dam in Shimane Prefecture, Japan

- Location within Japan
- Location: Shimane Prefecture, Japan
- Coordinates: 34°50′51″N 132°32′09″E
- Opening date: 1998

Dam and spillways
- Height: 18.6 m (61 ft)
- Length: 100 m (330 ft)

Reservoir
- Total capacity: 75,000 m^{3} (2,600,000 cu ft)
- Catchment area: 0.8 km^{2} (0.31 sq mi)
- Surface area: hectares

Yodohara Ohtutumi Dam is an earthfill dam located in Shimane Prefecture in Japan. The dam is used for irrigation. The catchment area of the dam is 0.8 km^{2}. The dam impounds about ha of land when full and can store 75 thousand cubic meters of water. The construction of the dam was completed in 1998.
