= Ueno Tameike Dam =

Dam in Shimane Prefecture, Japan

- Location within Japan
- Location: Shimane Prefecture, Japan
- Coordinates: 35°11′59″N 132°31′46″E
- Opening date: 1964

Dam and spillways
- Height: 15 m (49 ft)
- Length: 50 m (160 ft)

Reservoir
- Total capacity: 102,000 m^{3} (3,600,000 cu ft)
- Catchment area: 0.5 km^{2} (0.19 sq mi)
- Surface area: 3 hectares (7.4 acres)

Ueno Tameike Dam is a rockfill dam located in Shimane Prefecture in Japan. The dam is used for irrigation. The catchment area of the dam is 0.5 km^{2}. The dam impounds about 3 ha of land when full and can store 102 thousand cubic meters of water. The construction of the dam was completed in 1964.
