= Senbon Dam =

Dam in Shimane Prefecture, Japan

- Location: Shimane Prefecture, Japan
- Construction began: 1915
- Opening date: 1918

Reservoir
- Total capacity: 387,000 m^{3} 13,700,000 cu ft
- Catchment area: 15.4 km^{2} (5.9 sq mi)
- Surface area: 10 ha (25 acres)

Senbon Dam is a gravity dam located in Shimane Prefecture in Japan. The dam is used for water supply. The catchment area of the dam is 15.4 square kilometres (5.9 sq mi). The dam impounds about ten hectares (25 acres) of land when full and can store 387,000 cubic metres (13,700,000 cu ft) of water. The construction of the dam was started on 1915 and completed in 1918.
