= Sasakura Dam =

Dam in Shimane Prefecture, Japan

- Location within Japan
- Location: Shimane Prefecture, Japan
- Coordinates: 34°39′15″N 131°55′26″E
- Opening date: 1967

Dam and spillways
- Height: 36.3 m (119 ft)
- Length: 82.8 m (272 ft)

Reservoir
- Total capacity: 556,000 m^{3} (19,600,000 cu ft)
- Catchment area: 13.5 km^{2} (5.2 sq mi)
- Surface area: 5 hectares (12 acres)

Sasakura Dam is a gravity dam located in Shimane Prefecture in Japan. The dam is used for flood control. The catchment area of the dam is 13.5 km^{2}. The dam impounds about 5 ha of land when full and can store 556 thousand cubic meters of water. The construction of the dam was completed in 1967.
