= Kutsugahara Dam =

Dam in Hiroshima Prefecture, Japan

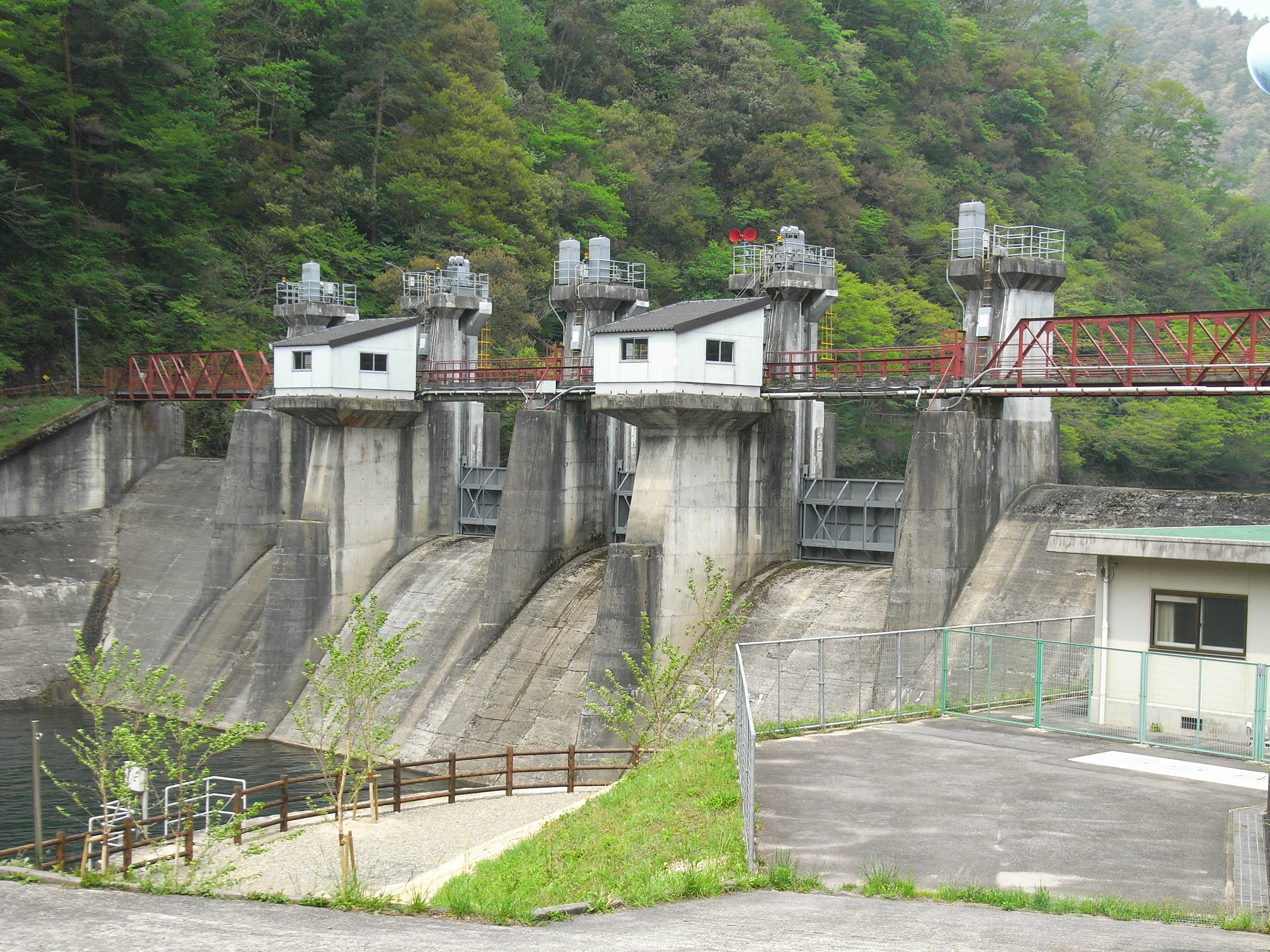
- Interactive map of Kutsugahara Dam
- Location: Hiroshima Prefecture, Japan.
- Coordinates: 34°57′21″N 132°48′50″E
- Opening date: 1941

Dam and spillways
- Impounds: Kaminose River
- Height: 19.5 m
- Length: 106.2 m

Reservoir
- Total capacity: 750,000 m^{3}
- Catchment area: 194 km^{2}
- Surface area: 16 hectares

Kutsugahara Dam is a dam in the Hiroshima Prefecture of Japan.
