= Ohto Dam =

Dam in Shimane Prefecture, Japan

- Location within Japan
- Location: Shimane Prefecture, Japan
- Coordinates: 34°39′22″N 131°55′03″E
- Opening date: 1959

Dam and spillways
- Height: 23.2 m (76 ft)
- Length: 67.4 m (221 ft)

Reservoir
- Total capacity: 239,000 m^{3} (8,400,000 cu ft)
- Catchment area: 5.5 km^{2} (2.1 sq mi)
- Surface area: 3 hectares (7.4 acres)

Ohto Dam is a gravity dam located in Shimane Prefecture in Japan. The dam is used for flood control. The catchment area of the dam is 5.5 km^{2}. The dam impounds about 3 ha of land when full and can store 239 thousand cubic meters of water. The construction of the dam was completed in 1959.
