= No.2 Hamada Dam =

Dam in Shimane Prefecture, Japan

- Location within Japan
- Location: Shimane Prefecture, Japan
- Coordinates: 34°52′41″N 132°6′50″E
- Construction began: 1990

Dam and spillways
- Height: 97.8 m (321 ft)
- Length: 218 m (715 ft)

Reservoir
- Total capacity: 15,470,000 m^{3} (546,000,000 cu ft)
- Catchment area: 37.4 km^{2} (14.4 sq mi)
- Surface area: 47 hectares (120 acres)

No.2 Hamada Dam is a gravity dam located in Shimane Prefecture in Japan. The dam is used for flood control. The catchment area of the dam is 37.4 km^{2}. The dam impounds about 47 ha of land when full and can store 15470 thousand cubic meters of water. The construction of the dam was started on 1990.
