= Tonokawauchi Tameike Dam =

Dam in Shimane Prefecture, Japan

- Location within Japan
- Location: Shimane Prefecture, Japan
- Coordinates: 35°21′44″N 133°15′34″E
- Opening date: 1964

Dam and spillways
- Height: 16 m (52 ft)
- Length: 62 m (203 ft)

Reservoir
- Total capacity: 180,000 m^{3} (6,400,000 cu ft)
- Catchment area: 0.3 km^{2} (0.12 sq mi)
- Surface area: 4 hectares (9.9 acres)

Tonokawauchi Tameike Dam is an earthfill dam located in Shimane Prefecture in Japan. The dam is used for irrigation. The catchment area of the dam is 0.3 km^{2}. The dam impounds about 4 ha of land when full and can store 180 thousand cubic meters of water. The construction of the dam was completed in 1964.
