= Yamasa Dam =

Dam in Shimane Prefecture, Japan

- Location within Japan
- Location: Shimane Prefecture, Japan
- Coordinates: 35°18′43″N 133°6′00″E
- Construction began: 1970
- Opening date: 1980

Dam and spillways
- Height: 56 m (184 ft)
- Length: 220 m (720 ft)

Reservoir
- Total capacity: 5,050,000 m^{3} (178,000,000 cu ft)
- Catchment area: 19.2 km^{2} (7.4 sq mi)
- Surface area: 28 hectares (69 acres)

Yamasa Dam is a gravity dam located in Shimane Prefecture in Japan. The dam is used for flood control and water supply. The catchment area of the dam is 19.2 km^{2}. The dam impounds about 28 ha of land when full and can store 5050 thousand cubic meters of water. The construction of the dam was started on 1970 and completed in 1980.
