= Yuyanooku Tameike Dam =

Dam in Shimane Prefecture, Japan

- Location within Japan
- Location: Shimane Prefecture, Japan
- Coordinates: 35°30′08″N 132°57′06″E
- Opening date: 1981

Dam and spillways
- Height: 18.4 m (60 ft)
- Length: 50 m (160 ft)

Reservoir
- Total capacity: 43,000 m^{3} (1,500,000 cu ft)
- Catchment area: 25.8 km^{2} (10.0 sq mi)
- Surface area: 1 hectare (2.5 acres)

Yuyanooku Tameike Dam is an earthfill dam located in Shimane Prefecture in Japan. The dam is used for irrigation. The catchment area of the dam is 25.8 km^{2}. The dam impounds about 1 ha of land when full and can store 43 thousand cubic meters of water. The construction of the dam was completed in 1981.
