= Nagami Dam =

Dam in Shimane Prefecture, Japan

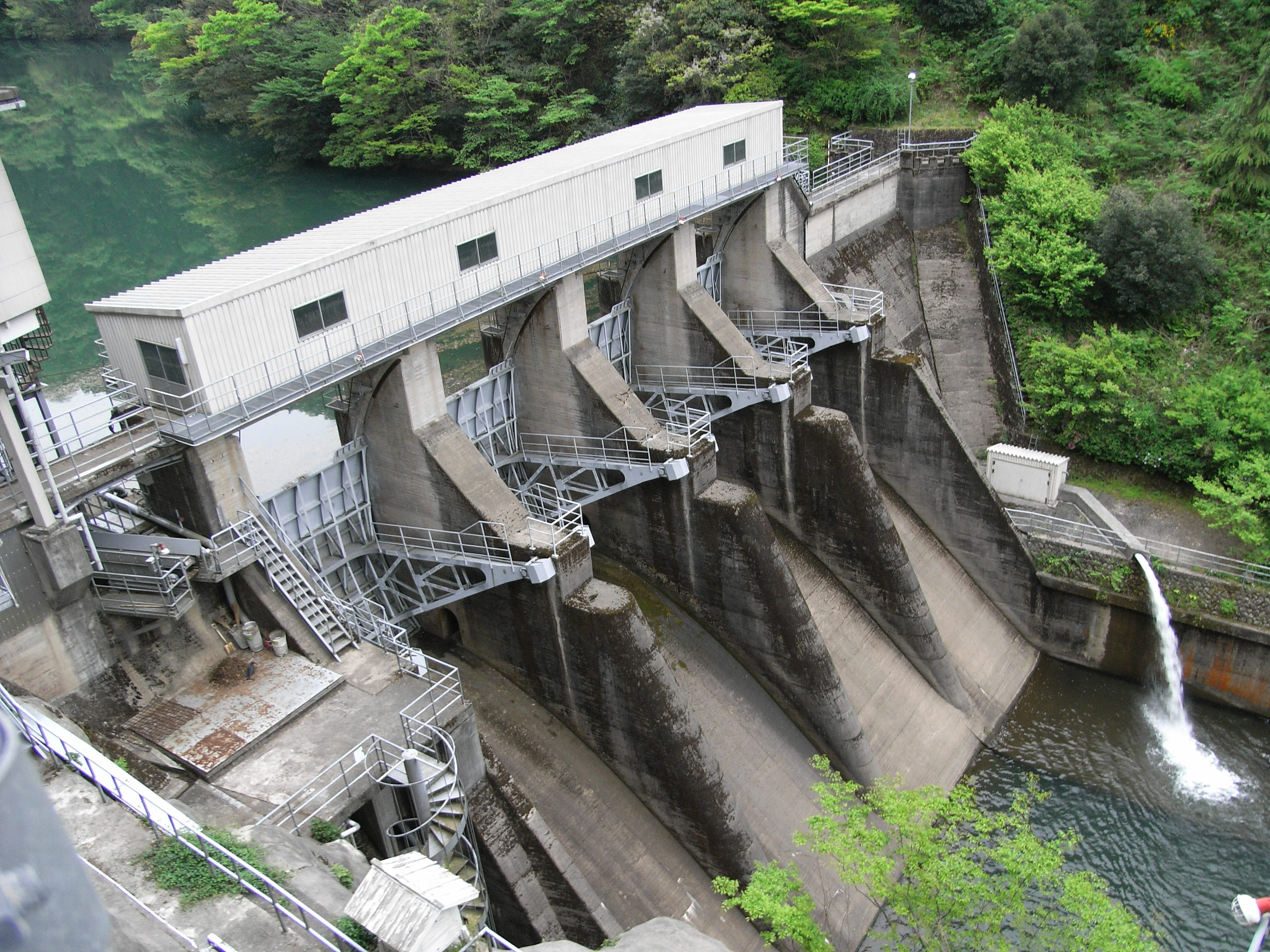

- Location within Japan
- Location: Shimane Prefecture, Japan
- Coordinates: 34°49′57″N 132°5′47″E
- Opening date: 1961

Dam and spillways
- Height: 20.2 m (66 ft)
- Length: 57.5 m (189 ft)

Reservoir
- Total capacity: 359 thousand cubic meters
- Catchment area: 108.1 sq. km
- Surface area: 6 hectares

Nagami Dam is a gravity dam located in Shimane Prefecture in Japan. The dam is used for power production. The catchment area of the dam is 108.1 km^{2}. The dam impounds about 6 ha of land when full and can store 359 thousand cubic meters of water. The construction of the dam was completed in 1961.
