= Masudagawa Dam =

Dam in Shimane Prefecture, Japan

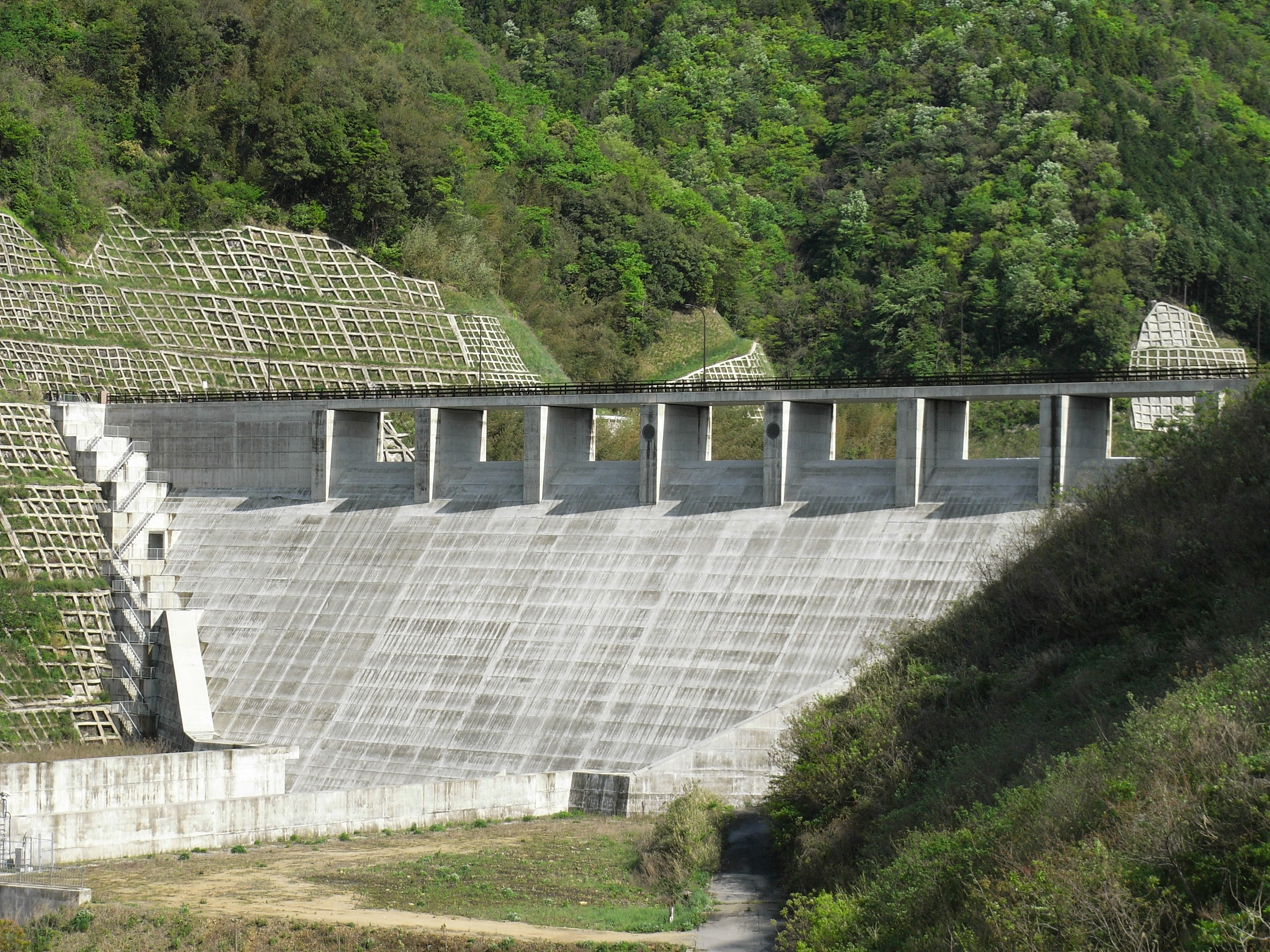

- Location within Japan
- Location: Shimane Prefecture, Japan
- Coordinates: 34°40′26″N 131°54′07″E
- Construction began: 1973
- Opening date: 2005

Dam and spillways
- Height: 48 m (157 ft)
- Length: 169 m (554 ft)

Reservoir
- Total capacity: 6750 thousand cubic meters
- Catchment area: 87.6 sq. km
- Surface area: 54 hectares

Masudagawa Dam is a gravity dam located in Shimane Prefecture in Japan. The dam is used for flood control. The catchment area of the dam is 87.6 km^{2}. The dam impounds about 54 ha of land when full and can store 6750 thousand cubic meters of water. The construction of the dam was started on 1973 and completed in 2005.
