= Sufugawa Dam =

Dam in Shimane Prefecture, Japan

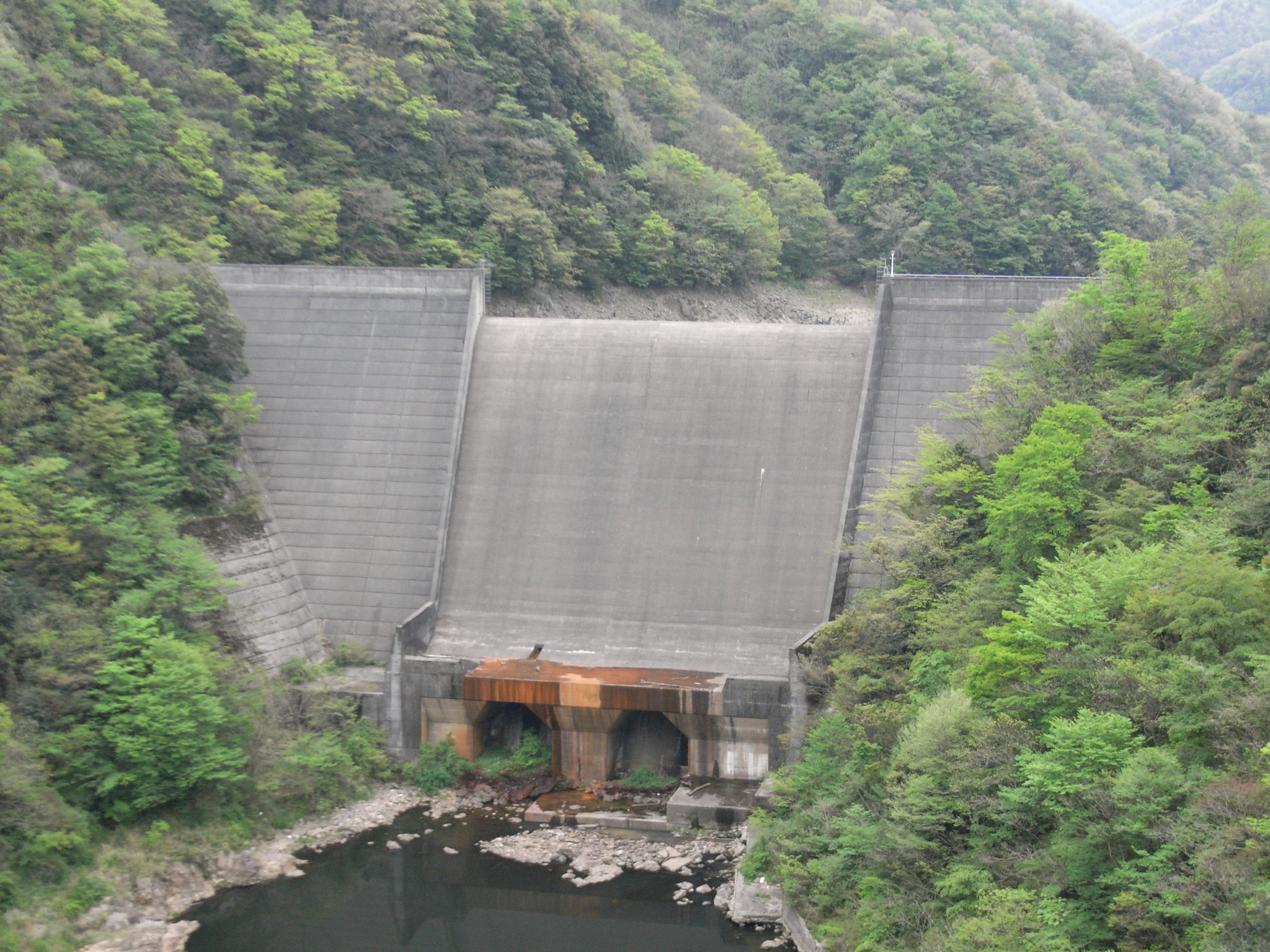

- Location within Japan
- Location: Shimane Prefecture, Japan
- Coordinates: 34°48′32″N 132°8′44″E
- Opening date: 1961

Dam and spillways
- Height: 58 m (190 ft)
- Length: 147 m (482 ft)

Reservoir
- Total capacity: 10,173,000 m^{3} (359,300,000 cu ft)
- Catchment area: 88.5 km^{2} (34.2 sq mi)
- Surface area: 53 hectares (130 acres)

Sufugawa Dam is a gravity dam located in Shimane Prefecture in Japan. The dam is used for power production. The catchment area of the dam is 88.5 km^{2}. The dam impounds about 53 ha of land when full and can store 10173 thousand cubic meters of water. The construction of the dam was completed in 1961.
