= Tsudagawa Dam =

Dam in Shimane Prefecture, Japan

- Location within Japan
- Location: Shimane Prefecture, Japan
- Coordinates: 34°41′37″N 131°53′50″E
- Opening date: 1975

Dam and spillways
- Height: 28.7 m (94 ft)
- Length: 83 m (272 ft)

Reservoir
- Total capacity: 340,000 m^{3} (12,000,000 cu ft)
- Catchment area: 12.1 km^{2} (4.7 sq mi)
- Surface area: 4 hectares (9.9 acres)

Tsudagawa Dam is a gravity dam located in Shimane Prefecture in Japan. The dam is used for flood control. The catchment area of the dam is 12.1 km^{2}. The dam impounds about 4 ha of land when full and can store 340 thousand cubic meters of water. The construction of the dam was completed in 1975.
