= Haizuka Dam =

Dam in Hiroshima Prefecture, Japan

Coordinates: 34°46′51″N 132°59′16″E

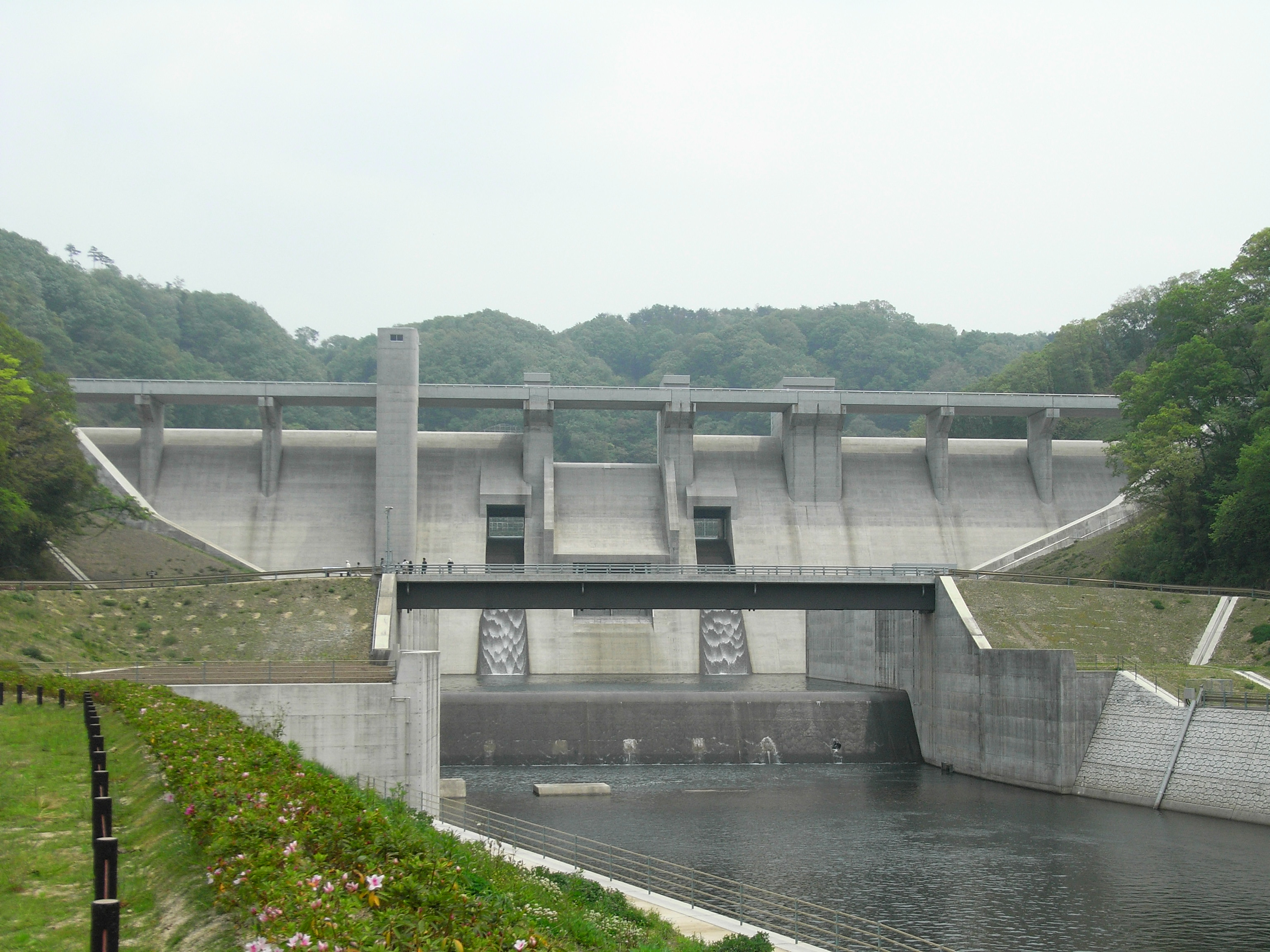
- Location: Shobara, Hiroshima Prefecture, Japan.
- Construction began: 1974
- Opening date: 2006

Dam and spillways
- Impounds: Joge River
- Height: 50.0 m
- Length: 196.6 m

Reservoir
- Total capacity: 52,100,000 m^{3}
- Catchment area: 217.0 km^{2}
- Surface area: 354 hectares

Haizuka Dam (灰塚ダム) is a dam in Shobara, in Hiroshima Prefecture of Japan.

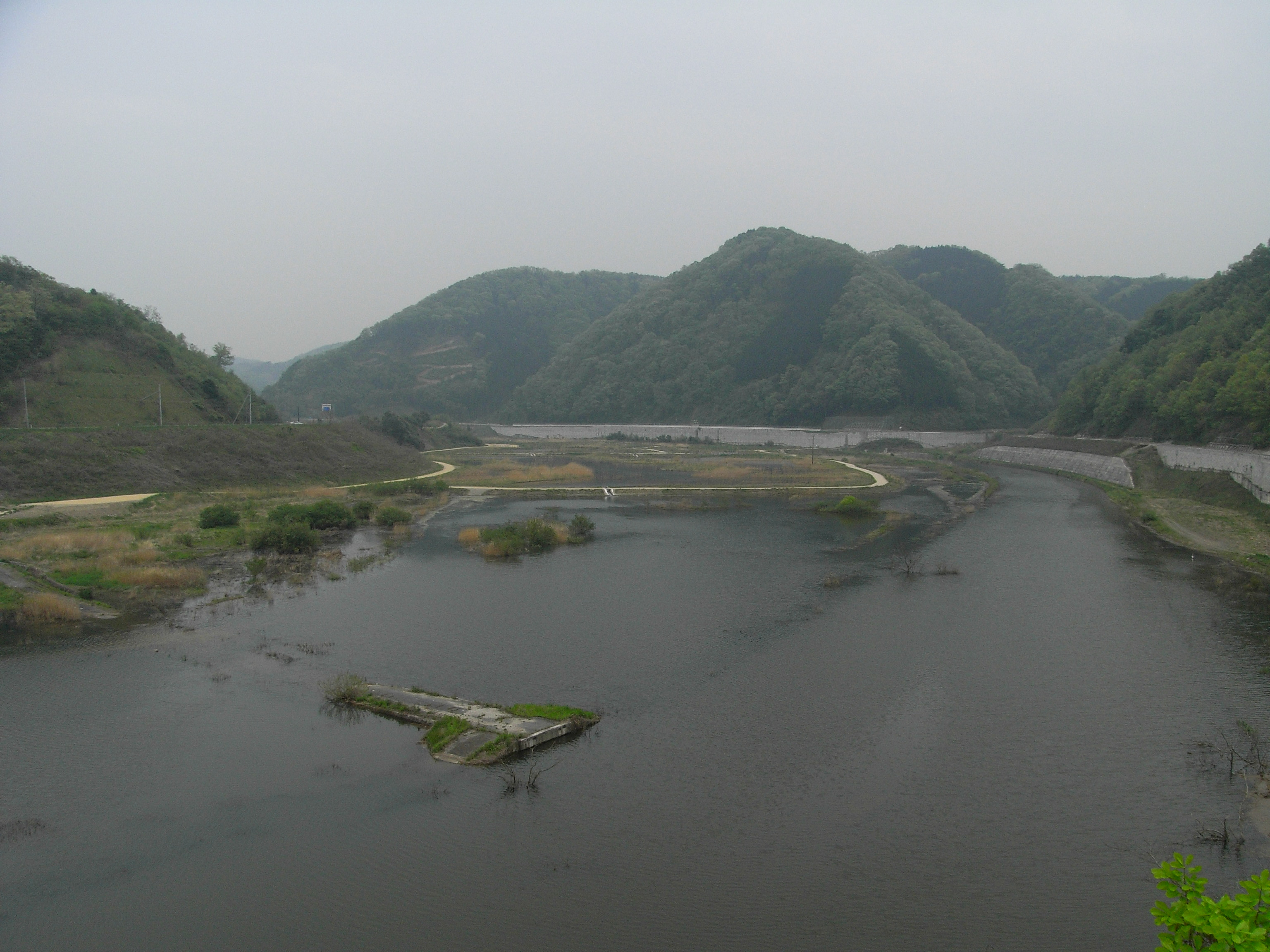
