= Fukahori Tameike Dam =

Dam in Shimane Prefecture, Japan

- Location within Japan
- Interactive map of Fukahori Tameike Dam
- Location: Shimane Prefecture, Japan
- Coordinates: 35°12′52″N 132°32′41″E
- Opening date: 1993

Dam and spillways
- Height: 15 m (49 ft)
- Length: 40 m (130 ft)

Reservoir
- Total capacity: 115 thousand cubic meters
- Catchment area: sq. km
- Surface area: 2 hectares

Fukahori Tameike Dam is an earthfill dam located in Shimane Prefecture in Japan. The dam is used for irrigation. The dam impounds about 2 ha of land when full and can store 115 thousand cubic meters of water. The construction of the dam was completed in 1993.
