= Sanbe Dam =

Dam in Shimane Prefecture, Japan

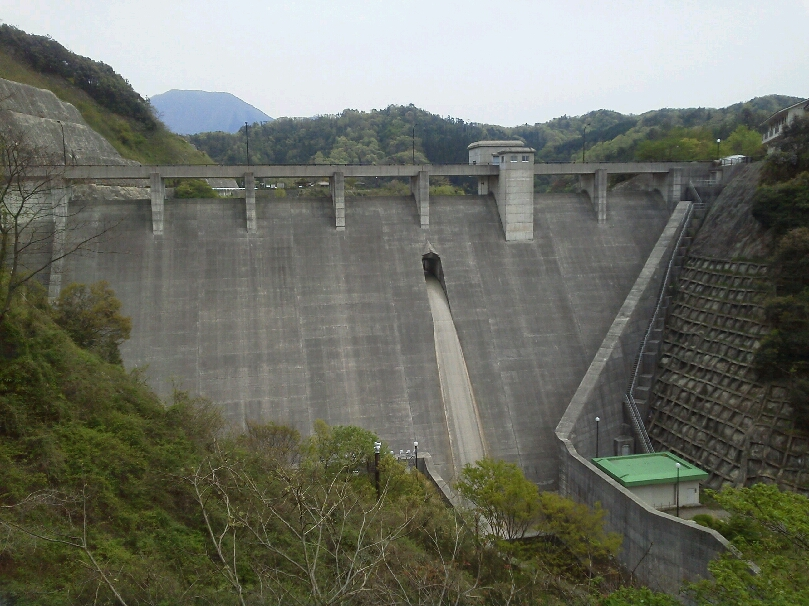

- Location within Japan
- Location: Shimane Prefecture, Japan
- Coordinates: 35°10′20″N 132°33′34″E
- Construction began: 1980
- Opening date: 1996

Dam and spillways
- Height: 54.5 m (179 ft)
- Length: 140 m (460 ft)

Reservoir
- Total capacity: 7,120,000 m^{3} (251,000,000 cu ft)
- Catchment area: 25.5 km^{2} (9.8 sq mi)
- Surface area: 46 hectares (110 acres)

Sanbe Dam is a gravity dam located in Shimane Prefecture in Japan. The dam is used for flood control and water supply. The catchment area of the dam is 25.5 km^{2}. The dam impounds about 46 ha of land when full and can store 7120 thousand cubic meters of water. The construction of the dam was started on 1980 and completed in 1996.
