= Sakane Dam =

Dam in Shimane Prefecture, Japan

- Location within Japan
- Location: Shimane Prefecture, Japan
- Coordinates: 35°5′41″N 133°6′41″E
- Construction began: 1974
- Opening date: 1992

Dam and spillways
- Height: 50.6 m (166 ft)
- Length: 157 m (515 ft)

Reservoir
- Total capacity: 790,000 m^{3} (28,000,000 cu ft)
- Catchment area: 3.9 km^{2} (1.5 sq mi)
- Surface area: 5 hectares (12 acres)

Sakane Dam is a gravity dam located in Shimane Prefecture in Japan. The dam is used for irrigation. The catchment area of the dam is 3.9 km^{2}. The dam impounds about five ha of land when full and can store 790 thousand cubic meters of water. The construction of the dam was started on 1974 and completed in 1992.
