= Hamahara Dam =

Dam in Shimane Prefecture, Japan

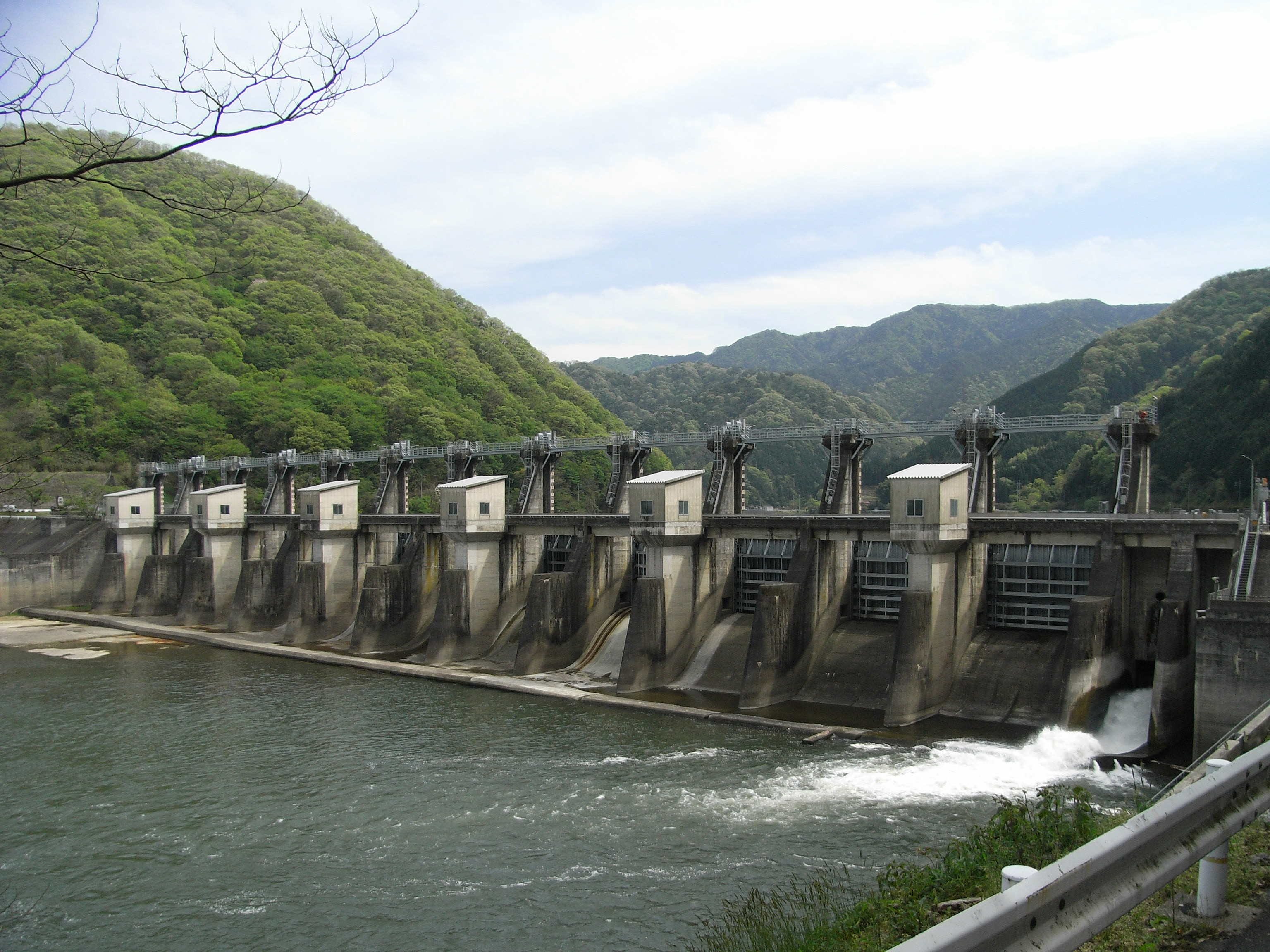

- Location within Japan
- Interactive map of Hamahara Dam
- Location: Shimane Prefecture, Japan
- Coordinates: 35°2′28″N 132°35′57″E
- Opening date: 1953

Dam and spillways
- Height: 19 m (62 ft)
- Length: 361.4 m (1,186 ft)

Reservoir
- Total capacity: 11200 thousand cubic meters
- Catchment area: 3000 sq. km
- Surface area: 149 hectares

Hamahara Dam is a gravity dam located in Shimane Prefecture in Japan. The dam is used for power production. The catchment area of the dam is 3000 km^{2}. The dam impounds about 149 ha of land when full and can store 11200 thousand cubic meters of water. The construction of the dam was completed in 1953.
