= List of dams in Hokkaido =

The following is a list of dams in Hokkaido, Japan.

== List ==
Name	Location	Started	Opened	Height	Length	Image	DiJ number
Aibetsu Dam				39 m (128 ft)			0131
Ainumanai Dam			1930	25.3 m (83 ft)	90.9 m (298 ft)		0031
Aoyama Dam		1951	1962	35.5 m (116 ft)	239.5 m (786 ft)		0064
Apporo Dam		1986	2018	47.2 m (155 ft)	516 m (1,693 ft)		2974
Ariake Dam		1967	1971	21.7 m (71 ft)	250 m (820 ft)		0083
Asahi No.1 Dam			1941	21.5 m (71 ft)	115 m (377 ft)		0037
Asahimachi No.2 Dam			1970	19.6 m (64 ft)	122 m (400 ft)		0080
Asari Dam		1993	1993	73.9 m (242 ft)			0157
Ashibetsu Dam			1952	16.5 m (54 ft)			0042
Azuma Dam		1959	1970	38.2 m (125 ft)	222 m (728 ft)		0079
Bibai Dam		1982	1982	35.5 m (116 ft)			0108
Biraotori Dam		1973	2021	55 m (180 ft)	350 m (1,150 ft)		0148
Bisei Dam		1975	1999	47.2 m (155 ft)	350 m (1,150 ft)		0137
Butoku Dam			1929	21.5 m (71 ft)	358 m (1,175 ft)		0024
Chitose Dam		1916	1918	23.6 m (77 ft)	119.4 m (392 ft)		0004
Chitose No.4 Dam			1919	21.9 m (72 ft)	102.4 m (336 ft)		0005
Chiyodani Dam			1923	17.9 m (59 ft)	165 m (541 ft)		0013
Chubetsu Dam		11 Mar 2007	2006	86 m (282 ft)			0134
Chureppu Dam		1926	1930	18.5 m (61 ft)	310 m (1,020 ft)		3351
Chuwa Dam			1924	23 m (75 ft)	248 m (814 ft)		0008
Ebeotsu No.1 Dam		1972	1977	18.5 m (61 ft)	206.5 m (677 ft)		3362
Ehoro Dam			1932	19.9 m (65 ft)	146 m (479 ft)		0027
Erumu Dam		1974	1997	53.7 m (176 ft)	258 m (846 ft)		0133
Etaibetsu Dam		1953	1967	35.5 m (116 ft)	173 m (568 ft)		0070
Etanbetsu Dam		1965	1974	17.4 m (57 ft)	220 m (720 ft)		3363
Fujisawa Dam			1923	17.5 m (57 ft)	95 m (312 ft)		0009
Fukuidanikawa Dam			1925	20.2 m (66 ft)	134 m (440 ft)		0010
Furukawa Dam		1928	1929	23.9 m (78 ft)	156.4 m (513 ft)		0028
Furuume Dam		1972	1996	48 m (157 ft)	215.9 m (708 ft)		0122
Futaba Dam		1966	1987	61.4 m (201 ft)	247.9 m (813 ft)		0102
Futakawa Dam		1976	1979	30.5 m (100 ft)	110 m (360 ft)		0099
Fuuen Dam			1986	33.6 m (110 ft)	294 m (965 ft)		0097
Goryo Dam			1986	23.9 m (78 ft)	606 m (1,988 ft)		0146
Haboro Dam		1959	1966	27.8 m (91 ft)	108.4 m (356 ft)		0072
Haboro-futamata Dam		1967	1978	33.6 m (110 ft)	125 m (410 ft)		0096
Hae Dam							
Higashinosawa Dam		1982	1987	70 m (230 ft)	140 m (460 ft)		0178
Higashisakuraoka No.1 Dam		1912	1913	17.4 m (57 ft)	292 m (958 ft)		3364
Hinode Dam		1970	1982	26.8 m (88 ft)	153 m (502 ft)		0116
Hobetsu Dam		1970	1985	38.2 m (125 ft)	283.2 m (929 ft)		0114
Hoheikyo Dam		1972	1972	102.5 m (336 ft)			0087
Hokushin Dam		1976	1980	32 m (105 ft)	180 m (590 ft)		0110
Horobetsu Dam		17 Apr 1968		22.5 m (74 ft)			0074
Horoka Dam			1965	32 m (105 ft)	135.5 m (445 ft)		0067
Horomangawa No.3 Dam		1952	1954	42.5 m (139 ft)	186.3 m (611 ft)		0044
Horomui Dam		1971	1990	44.4 m (146 ft)	430 m (1,410 ft)		0120
Horonai Dam							
Horoshin Dam		1965	1975	27 m (89 ft)	283.1 m (929 ft)		0092
Ichihosawa Dam		1924	1927	17.4 m (57 ft)	86 m (282 ft)		3356
Inada Dam			1979	17.6 m (58 ft)	220 m (720 ft)		0026
Iwachishi Dam		1956	1958	33 m (108 ft)	92.2 m (302 ft)		0051
Iwamatsu Dam		1939	1941	37.2 m (122 ft)			0038
Iwamura Dam		1968	1973	17 m (56 ft)	146.5 m (481 ft)		3360
Iwaonai Dam				58 m (190 ft)			0081
Iwashimizu Dam			1959	30 m (98 ft)	124.2 m (407 ft)		0053
Izarigawa Dam		1971	1980	45.5 m (149 ft)			0100
Jōzankei Dam		1989	1989	118 m (387 ft)			0124
Kakkomi Dam		1953	1955	34 m (112 ft)	185 m (607 ft)		0046
Kamiiso Dam		1971	1990	32 m (105 ft)	408 m (1,339 ft)		0107
Kamiiwamatsu Dam							
Kamikogawa Dam		1974	2003	33.2 m (109 ft)	187.3 m (615 ft)		0127
Kaminokuni Dam		1985	2002	51.3 m (168 ft)	247.9 m (813 ft)		2930
Kamiyunai Dam		1950	1956	15.5 m (51 ft)	108.5 m (356 ft)		0048
Kamui Dam		1976	1997	40.4 m (133 ft)	143.2 m (470 ft)		0139
Kanayama Dam		1959	1967	57.3 m (188 ft)			0073
Kanoko Dam		1972	1983	55.5 m (182 ft)			0115
Katsurazawa Dam		1947	1957	63.6 m (209 ft)			0049
Kawabata Dam		1954	1962	21.4 m (70 ft)	280 m (920 ft)		0060
Kinausu Dam		1989	2009	27.2 m (89 ft)	177 m (581 ft)		
Kitasen Dam			1967	18.3 m (60 ft)	74 m (243 ft)		0075
Kimun Dam							
Komagatake Dam		1970	1984	43.6 m (143 ft)	72 m (236 ft)		0103
Koshi Dam		1934	1937	16.3 m (53 ft)	180 m (590 ft)		3353
Kukkari Dam							
Kuobetsu Dam			1925	21.3 m (70 ft)	124 m (407 ft)		0020
Kuriyama Dam		1983	1994	31.9 m (105 ft)			0152
Kuttari Dam		1983	1988	27.5 m (90 ft)	220.1 m (722 ft)		2912
Kyoei Dam		1963	1965	18.6 m (61 ft)	88 m (289 ft)		3354
Kyogoku Dam		1999	2014	54 m (177 ft)	332.5 m (1,091 ft)		3307
Kyowa Dam		1978	1995	56 m (184 ft)	334 m (1,096 ft)		0161
Maedanosawa Dam			1927	16.5 m (54 ft)	95 m (312 ft)		3386
Makinouchi Dam		1978	1980	18.5 m (61 ft)	105 m (344 ft)		0170
Makomanai Dam		1965	1986	34.3 m (113 ft)	234.6 m (770 ft)		0105
Makubetsu Dam		1978	2004	26.9 m (88 ft)	335 m (1,099 ft)		0150
Maruyama Dam							
Midori Dam		1974	2003	73 m (240 ft)	345 m (1,132 ft)		0176
Mikasabonbetsu Dam		1985	2023	53 m (174 ft)	160 m (520 ft)		2929
Mitsuishi Dam		1970	1991	35 m (115 ft)	240 m (790 ft)		0104
Mizuho Dam		1982	1998	25.9 m (85 ft)	427.1 m (1,401 ft)		0164
Mizusawa Dam							
Moheizawa No.2 Dam			1985	19.8 m (65 ft)	137.6 m (451 ft)		0016
Monbetsu Dam			1971	20.8 m (68 ft)	117 m (384 ft)		0085
Morai Dam		1977	1996	29.6 m (97 ft)	238.5 m (782 ft)		0141
Motogoya Dam			1960	32 m (105 ft)	86 m (282 ft)		0056
Muri Dam			1980	15.5 m (51 ft)			0101
Nakahoro Dam		1971	1990	25.8 m (85 ft)	123 m (404 ft)		0106
Nakano Dam		1956	1960	53 m (174 ft)	162 m (531 ft)		3619
Nakano Sabo Dam							
Nakanosawa Dam			1937	15.2 m (50 ft)	180 m (590 ft)		0033
Nanbuzaka Dam		1986	2009	26.1 m (86 ft)	299 m (981 ft)		2948
Nibutani Dam		Oct 1997	Apr 1998	32 m (105 ft)			0149
Nigorikawa Dam		1975	2005	42 m (138 ft)	219 m (719 ft)		0135
Niikappu Dam		1970	1974	102.8 m (337 ft)	326 m (1,070 ft)		0088
Ninosawa Dam		1923	1925	18.4 m (60 ft)	125.1 m (410 ft)		3355
Nishioka Dam		1993	2009	31 m (102 ft)	247 m (810 ft)		3196
Nishisatsunai Dam		1979	1994	21 m (69 ft)	184 m (604 ft)		0160
Nisshin Dam			1973	29.5 m (97 ft)	230.3 m (756 ft)		0084
Nisshin-Ko Dam			1924	26.5 m (87 ft)	213.5 m (700 ft)		0007
Nokanan Dam		1969	1978	41.5 m (136 ft)	312.5 m (1,025 ft)		0082
Nukabira Dam		1953	1956	76 m (249 ft)	293 m (961 ft)		0047
Nukanan Dam			1960	18.6 m (61 ft)	312.5 m (1,025 ft)		0055
Numanosawa Dam							
Numata Dam		1972	1991	44.9 m (147 ft)	395 m (1,296 ft)		0130
Nuppanosawa Dam		1931	1933	22.7 m (74 ft)	190 m (620 ft)		3358
Obira Dam		1972	1992	42.4 m (139 ft)	475 m (1,558 ft)		0132
Ochiai Dam		1987	2001	35.3 m (116 ft)	199.5 m (655 ft)		2969
Ohno Dam		1990	2002	47.5 m (156 ft)	160 m (520 ft)		3064
Ohsawa Dam		1974	2002	28.9 m (95 ft)	318 m (1,043 ft)		0136
Otodo Dam		1983	2003	34 m (112 ft)	124 m (407 ft)		0179
Oyubari Dam		1954	1962	67.5 m (221 ft)			0054
Okinai Dam		1976	1995	29.6 m (97 ft)	157 m (515 ft)		0140
Okuniikappu Dam		1958	1963	61.2 m (201 ft)	110 m (360 ft)		0062
Okusaru Dam		1990	1994	30 m (98 ft)	105.5 m (346 ft)		3105
Okusawa Dam		1914					
Omu Dam		1989	2009	53.6 m (176 ft)	234 m (768 ft)		0165
Onnebetsu Dam			1985	33.7 m (111 ft)	178 m (584 ft)		0123
Ononosawa Dam			1931	16.8 m (55 ft)	150 m (490 ft)		3385
Oshirarika Dam		1953	1966	31.8 m (104 ft)	233 m (764 ft)		0065
Ososhu Dam							
Otofuketosui Dam							
Ozawa Dam		1973	1994	25.4 m (83 ft)	300 m (980 ft)		0118
Peepan Dam		1973	1997	49.2 m (161 ft)	312.5 m (1,025 ft)		0129
Pirika Dam		1991	1991	40 m (130 ft)			0151
Ponteshio Dam		1979	1983	22.3 m (73 ft)	126.2 m (414 ft)		0172
Rumoi Dam		1984	2009	41.2 m (135 ft)	440 m (1,440 ft)		0181
Sahoro Dam		1970	1984	46.6 m (153 ft)	255 m (837 ft)		0111
Sakasagawa Dam							
Samuni Dam		1968	1975	44 m (144 ft)	140 m (460 ft)		0091
Sankei Dam			1960	17 m (56 ft)	77 m (253 ft)		0052
Sannosawa No.1 Dam			1924	20 m (66 ft)	168 m (551 ft)		0015
Sannosawa No.2 Dam		1953	1954	16 m (52 ft)	132.5 m (435 ft)		3357
Sanru Dam		1988	2018	46 m (151 ft)	350 m (1,150 ft)		2995
Sasanagare Dam			1923	25.3 m (83 ft)	199.3 m (654 ft)		0014
Satsunaigawa Dam		1981	1998	114 m (374 ft)	300 m (980 ft)		0173
Seidai Dam			1937	29.7 m (97 ft)	485.4 m (1,593 ft)		0035
Seiwa Dam		1924	1926	15.8 m (52 ft)	255 m (837 ft)		3352
Senbiri Dam							
Shimizunosawa Dam		1980	1984	25.1 m (82 ft)	96 m (315 ft)		3298
Shimizusawa Dam			1940	25.4 m (83 ft)	91.8 m (301 ft)		0036
Shimohorokanai Dam			1970	20.7 m (68 ft)	184 m (604 ft)		0029
Shimoniikappu Dam		1967	1969	46 m (151 ft)	131 m (430 ft)		0077
Shinkukaku Dam			1970	32.3 m (106 ft)	274.7 m (901 ft)		0078
Shinnakano Dam		1971	1984	74.9 m (246 ft)	248 m (814 ft)		0113
Shintotsugawa Dam		1952	1959	29.2 m (96 ft)	95.3 m (313 ft)		0058
Shirakizawa Dam		1963	1968	23.7 m (78 ft)	114.9 m (377 ft)		3361
Shiriuchi Dam		1980	1993	40.5 m (133 ft)	321 m (1,053 ft)		0168
Shirogane Dam			2002	63.5 m (208 ft)	611 m (2,005 ft)		0109
Shizunai Dam		1959	1966	66 m (217 ft)	207.5 m (681 ft)		0071
Shodusawa Dam							
Shoro Dam				48.9 m (160 ft)			0138
Soshubetsu Dam		1958	1961	29 m (95 ft)	83 m (272 ft)		0059
Shunbetsu Dam		1960	1963	27 m (89 ft)	90 m (300 ft)		0063
Taisetsu Dam		1965	1975	86.5 m (284 ft)	440 m (1,440 ft)		0089
Taisetsu Dam		1965	1975	86.5 m (284 ft)	440 m (1,440 ft)		0089
Taisho-ike Dam			1914	15.9 m (52 ft)	232 m (761 ft)		0001
Takadomari Dam		1949	1953	37 m (121 ft)	170.5 m (559 ft)		0043
Takami Dam			1983	120 m (390 ft)			0117
Takara-ike Dam			1925	17.1 m (56 ft)	158.8 m (521 ft)		0018
Takatomi Dam		1987	2005	17.9 m (59 ft)	185 m (607 ft)		3303
Takisato Dam		1999	1999	50 m (160 ft)			0158
Tamiyasu Dam		1984	2001	24 m (79 ft)	260.5 m (855 ft)		0182
Tarumappu Bosai Dam		1972	2000	24 m (79 ft)	330 m (1,080 ft)		0128
Tobetsu Dam		1980	2012	52.7 m (173 ft)			0171
Togo Dam		1969		47.5 m (156 ft)	375.4 m (1,232 ft)		0121
Tokachi Dam		1970	1984	84.3 m (277 ft)			0112
Tokiwa Dam		1969	1971	20.1 m (66 ft)	120 m (390 ft)		0169
Tokorogawa Dam			1932	24.5 m (80 ft)	57.9 m (190 ft)		0032
Toma Dam			1967	21.3 m (70 ft)	218 m (715 ft)		0057
Tomamae Dam		1991	1999	34.8 m (114 ft)	155 m (509 ft)		0180
Tomisato Dam		1969	1987	44.3 m (145 ft)	280 m (920 ft)		0126
Tomura Dam		1975	1978	37 m (121 ft)	106 m (348 ft)		0098
Toppu Dam		1979	2013	78.4 m (257 ft)	309 m (1,014 ft)		0175
Toyama Dam		1968	1972	30 m (98 ft)	217 m (712 ft)		0086
Toyogaoka Dam		1960	1966	18.7 m (61 ft)	139 m (456 ft)		3359
Tsukigata Dam		1965	1976	28.8 m (94 ft)	208.1 m (683 ft)		0093
Ubaranai Dam		1978	2000	40.5 m (133 ft)	355 m (1,165 ft)		0159
Uennai Dam		1968	1978	26.8 m (88 ft)	320 m (1,050 ft)		0095
Uguikawa Dam		1979	1986	21.1 m (69 ft)	114 m (374 ft)		3387
Urakawa Dam		1973	1999	42.1 m (138 ft)	296 m (971 ft)		0147
Uryu Doentei Dam		1939	1943	22 m (72 ft)	442 m (1,450 ft)		0041
Uryu No.1 Dam	,	2018		45.5 m (149 ft)	216 m (709 ft)		3700
Uryu No.2 Dam		1939	1943	35.7 m (117 ft)	230 m (750 ft)		0039
Uzura Dam		1969	2001	52.2 m (171 ft)	220 m (720 ft)		0119
Wakka Dam			1925	25.5 m (84 ft)	172 m (564 ft)		0011
Yabetsu Dam		1969	1975	33.6 m (110 ft)	84 m (276 ft)		0094
Yoichi Dam		1971	1987	36.8 m (121 ft)	220 m (720 ft)		0125
Yubarisyuparo Dam		1991	2014	110.6 m (363 ft)	390 m (1,280 ft)		3101

== See also ==
Media related to Dams in Hokkaido at Wikimedia Commons
