= Horomui Dam =

Dam in Hokkaido Prefecture, Japan

- Location within Japan
- Interactive map of Horomui Dam
- Location: Hokkaido Prefecture, Japan
- Coordinates: 43°9′50″N 141°56′12″E
- Construction began: 1971
- Opening date: 1990

Dam and spillways
- Height: 44.4 m (146 ft)
- Length: 430 m (1,410 ft)

Reservoir
- Total capacity: 8340 thousand cubic meters
- Catchment area: 28.7 sq. km
- Surface area: 63 hectares

Horomui Dam (Japanese: 幌向ダム) is a rockfill dam located in Hokkaido Prefecture in Japan. The dam is used for irrigation. The catchment area of the dam is 28.7 km^{2}. The dam impounds about 63 ha of land when full and can store 8340 thousand cubic meters of water. The construction of the dam was started on 1971 and completed in 1990.
