= Toyogaoka Dam =

Dam in Hokkaido Prefecture, Japan

- Location within Japan
- Location: Hokkaido Prefecture, Japan
- Coordinates: 43°22′52″N 141°42′14″E
- Construction began: 1960
- Opening date: 1966

Dam and spillways
- Height: 18.7 m (61 ft)
- Length: 139 m (456 ft)

Reservoir
- Total capacity: 275,000 m^{3} (9,700,000 cu ft)
- Catchment area: 2.8 km^{2} (1.1 sq mi)
- Surface area: 4 hectares (9.9 acres)

Toyogaoka Dam (Japanese: 豊ヶ丘ダム) is an earthfill dam located in Hokkaido Prefecture in Japan. The dam is used for irrigation. The catchment area of the dam is 2.8 km^{2}. The dam impounds about 4 ha of land when full and can store 275 thousand cubic meters of water. The construction of the dam was started on 1960 and completed in 1966.
