= Okusaru Dam =

Dam in Hokkaido Prefecture, Japan

- Location within Japan
- Location: Hokkaido Prefecture, Japan
- Coordinates: 42°55′38″N 142°39′46″E
- Construction began: 1990
- Opening date: 1994

Dam and spillways
- Height: 30 m (98 ft)
- Length: 105.5 m (346 ft)

Reservoir
- Total capacity: 530,000 m^{3} (19,000,000 cu ft)
- Catchment area: 52 km^{2} (20 sq mi)
- Surface area: 7 hectares (17 acres)

Okusaru Dam (Japanese: 奥沙流ダム) is a gravity dam located in Hokkaido Prefecture in Japan. The dam is used for power production. The catchment area of the dam is 52 km^{2}. The dam impounds about 7 ha of land when full and can store 530 thousand cubic meters of water. The construction of the dam was started on 1990 and completed in 1994.
