= Sosyubetsu Dam =

Dam in Hokkaido Prefecture, Japan

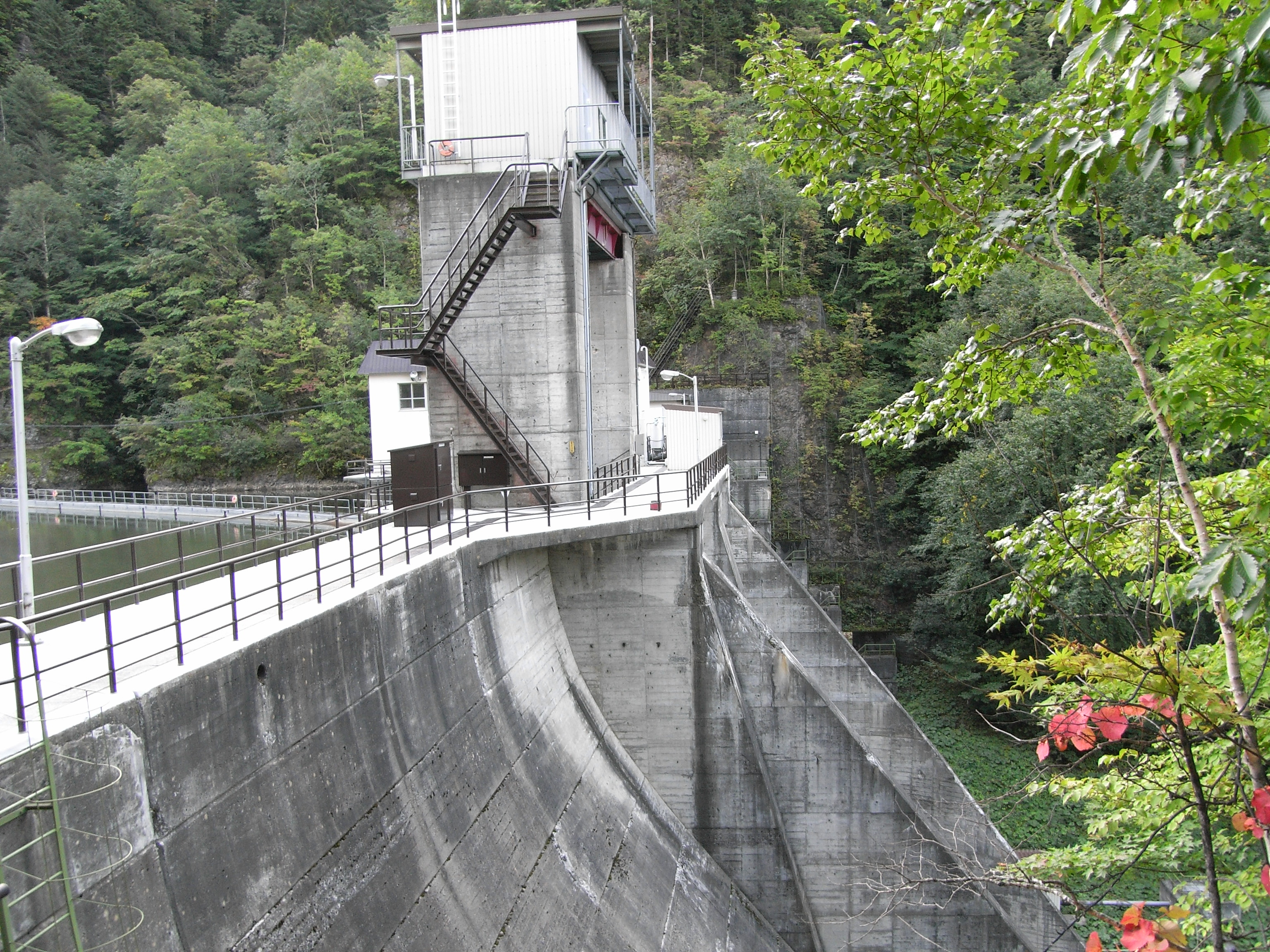

- Location within Japan
- Location: Hokkaido Prefecture, Japan
- Coordinates: 42°57′11″N 142°32′42″E
- Construction began: 1958
- Opening date: 1961

Dam and spillways
- Height: 29 m (95 ft)
- Length: 83 m (272 ft)

Reservoir
- Total capacity: 1,330,000 m^{3} (47,000,000 cu ft)
- Catchment area: 192 km^{2} (74 sq mi)
- Surface area: 18 hectares (44 acres)

Sosyubetsu Dam (Japanese: 双珠別ダム) is a gravity dam located in Hokkaido Prefecture in Japan. The dam is used for power production. The catchment area of the dam is 192 km^{2}. The dam impounds about 18 ha of land when full and can store 1330 thousand cubic meters of water. The construction of the dam was started on 1958 and completed in 1961.
