= Mizuho Dam =

Dam in Hokkaido Prefecture, Japan

- Location within Japan
- Location: Hokkaido Prefecture, Japan
- Coordinates: 42°50′26″N 141°53′49″E
- Construction began: 1982
- Opening date: 1998

Dam and spillways
- Height: 25.9 m (85 ft)
- Length: 427.1 m (1,401 ft)

Reservoir
- Total capacity: 4300 thousand cubic meters
- Catchment area: 12.2 sq. km
- Surface area: 56 hectares

Mizuho Dam (Japanese: 瑞穂ダム) is a rockfill dam located in Hokkaido Prefecture in Japan. The dam is used for irrigation. The catchment area of the dam is 12.2 km^{2}. The dam impounds about 56 ha of land when full and can store 4300 thousand cubic meters of water. The construction of the dam was started on 1982 and completed in 1998.
