= Tsukigata Dam =

Dam in Hokkaido Prefecture, Japan

- Location within Japan
- Location: Hokkaido Prefecture, Japan
- Coordinates: 43°22′57″N 141°38′48″E
- Construction began: 1965
- Opening date: 1976

Dam and spillways
- Height: 28.8 m (94 ft)
- Length: 208.1 m (683 ft)

Reservoir
- Total capacity: 4,834,000 m^{3} (170,700,000 cu ft)
- Catchment area: 32.3 km^{2} (12.5 sq mi)
- Surface area: 43 hectares (110 acres)

Tsukigata Dam (Japanese: 月形ダム) is an earthfill dam located in Hokkaido Prefecture in Japan. The dam is used for irrigation. The catchment area of the dam is 32.3 km^{2}. The dam impounds about 43 ha of land when full and can store 4834 thousand cubic meters of water. The construction of the dam was started on 1965 and completed in 1976.
