= Oshirarika Dam =

Dam in Hokkaido Prefecture, Japan

- Location within Japan
- Location: Hokkaido Prefecture, Japan
- Coordinates: 43°40′12″N 141°46′27″E
- Construction began: 1953
- Opening date: 1966

Dam and spillways
- Height: 31.8 m (104 ft)
- Length: 233 m (764 ft)

Reservoir
- Total capacity: 10,979,000 m^{3} (387,700,000 cu ft)
- Catchment area: 87 km^{2} (34 sq mi)
- Surface area: 120 hectares (300 acres)

Oshirarika Dam (Japanese: 尾白利加ダム) is a rockfill dam located in Hokkaido Prefecture in Japan. The dam is used for irrigation. The catchment area of the dam is 87 km^{2}. The dam impounds about 120 ha of land when full and can store 10979 thousand cubic meters of water. The construction of the dam was started on 1953 and completed in 1966.
