= Sasanagare Dam =

Dam in Hokkaido Prefecture, Japan

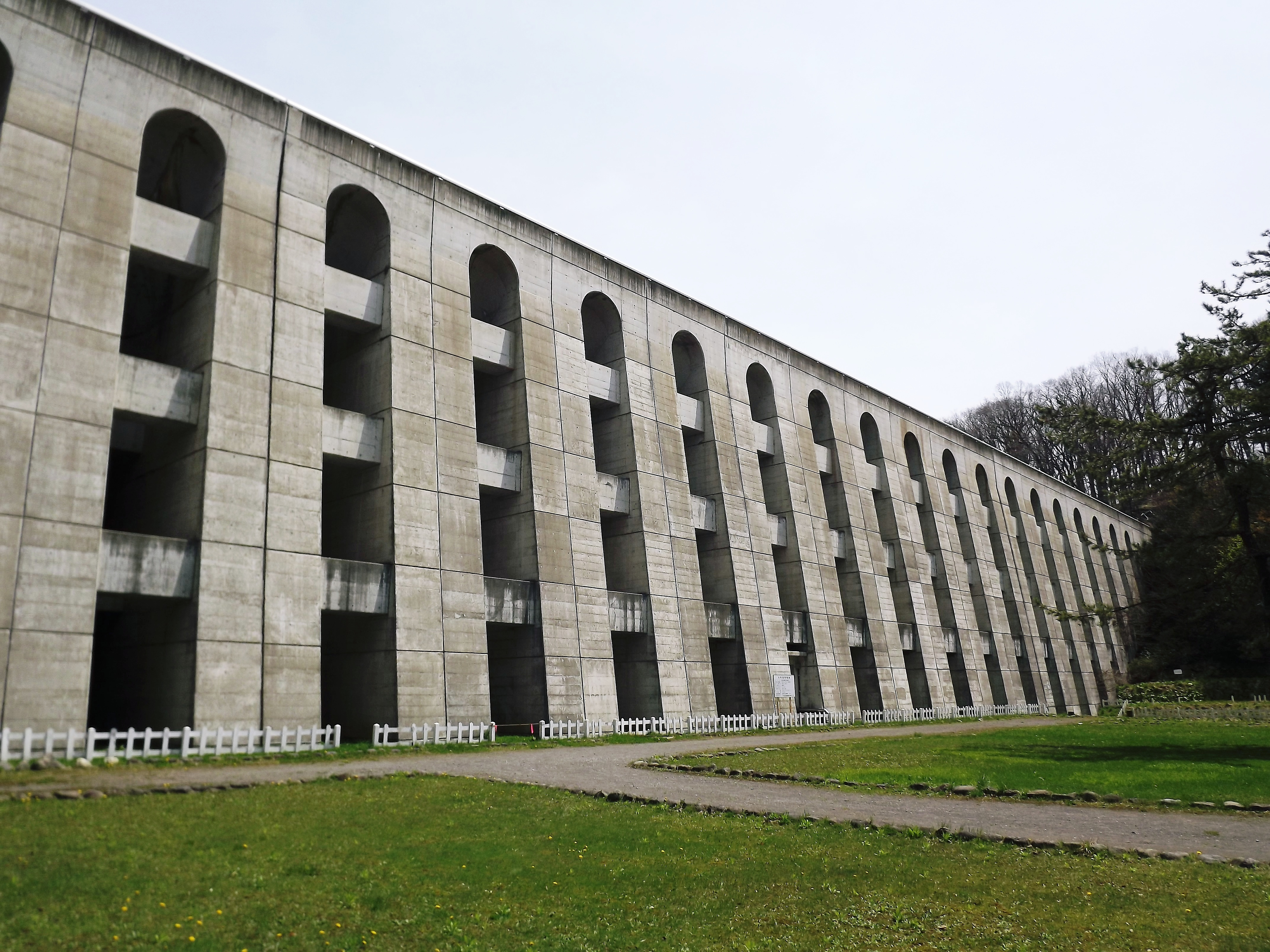

- Location within Japan
- Location: Hokkaido Prefecture, Japan
- Coordinates: 41°50′06″N 140°46′24″E
- Opening date: 1923

Dam and spillways
- Height: 25.3 m (83 ft)
- Length: 199.3 m (654 ft)

Reservoir
- Total capacity: 606,000 m^{3} (21,400,000 cu ft)
- Catchment area: 5.4 km^{2} (2.1 sq mi)
- Surface area: 7 hectares (17 acres)

Sasanagare Dam (Japanese: 笹流ダム) is a buttress dam located in Hokkaido Prefecture in Japan. The dam is used for water supply. The catchment area of the dam is 5.4 km^{2}. The dam impounds about 7 ha of land when full and can store 606 thousand cubic meters of water. The construction of the dam was completed in 1923.
