= Shinkukaku Dam =

Dam in Hokkaido Prefecture, Japan

- Location within Japan
- Location: Hokkaido Prefecture, Japan
- Coordinates: 43°36′02″N 142°30′46″E
- Opening date: 1970

Dam and spillways
- Height: 32.3 m (106 ft)
- Length: 274.7 m (901 ft)

Reservoir
- Total capacity: 5,600,000 m^{3} (200,000,000 cu ft)
- Catchment area: 43.1 km^{2} (16.6 sq mi)
- Surface area: 46 hectares (110 acres)

Shinkukaku Dam (Japanese: 新区画ダム) is an earthfill dam located in Hokkaido Prefecture in Japan. The dam is used for irrigation. The catchment area of the dam is 43.1 km^{2}. The dam impounds about 46 ha of land when full and can store 5600 thousand cubic meters of water. The construction of the dam was completed in 1970.
