= Nishioka Dam =

Dam in Hokkaido Prefecture, Japan

- Location within Japan
- Location: Hokkaido Prefecture, Japan
- Coordinates: 44°4′03″N 142°17′53″E
- Construction began: 1993
- Opening date: 2009

Dam and spillways
- Height: 31 m (102 ft)
- Length: 247 m (810 ft)

Reservoir
- Total capacity: 844,000 m^{3} (29,800,000 cu ft)
- Catchment area: 4.5 km^{2} (1.7 sq mi)
- Surface area: 9 hectares (22 acres)

Nishioka Dam (Japanese: 西岡ダム) is a rockfill dam located in Hokkaido Prefecture in Japan. The dam is used for flood control and water supply. The catchment area of the dam is 4.5 km^{2}. The dam impounds about 9 ha of land when full and can store 844 thousand cubic meters of water. The construction of the dam was started on 1993 and completed in 2009.
