= Ononosawa Dam =

Dam in Hokkaido Prefecture, Japan

- Location within Japan
- Location: Hokkaido Prefecture, Japan
- Coordinates: 43°13′35″N 141°51′35″E
- Opening date: 1931

Dam and spillways
- Height: 16.8 m (55 ft)
- Length: 150 m (490 ft)

Reservoir
- Total capacity: 157,000 m^{3} (5,500,000 cu ft)
- Catchment area: 0.5 km^{2} (0.19 sq mi)
- Surface area: 2 hectares (4.9 acres)

Ononosawa Dam (Japanese: 小野の沢ダム) is an earthfill dam located in Hokkaido Prefecture in Japan. The dam is used for irrigation. The catchment area of the dam is 0.5 km^{2}. The dam impounds about 2 ha of land when full and can store 157 thousand cubic meters of water. The construction of the dam was completed in 1931.
