= Hobetsu Dam =

Dam in Hokkaido Prefecture, Japan

- Location within Japan
- Interactive map of Hobetsu Dam
- Location: Hokkaido Prefecture, Japan
- Coordinates: 42°53′05″N 142°10′46″E
- Construction began: 1970
- Opening date: 1985

Dam and spillways
- Height: 38.2 m (125 ft)
- Length: 283.2 m (929 ft)

Reservoir
- Total capacity: 10330 thousand cubic meters
- Catchment area: 70.5 sq. km
- Surface area: 109 hectares

Hobetsu Dam (Japanese: 穂別ダム) is a rockfill dam located in Hokkaido Prefecture in Japan. The dam is used for irrigation. The catchment area of the dam is 70.5 km^{2}. The dam impounds about 109 ha of land when full and can store 10330 thousand cubic meters of water. The construction of the dam was started on 1970 and completed in 1985.
