= Nuppanosawa Dam =

Dam in Hokkaido Prefecture, Japan

- Location within Japan
- Location: Hokkaido Prefecture, Japan
- Coordinates: 43°15′48″N 141°53′13″E
- Construction began: 1931
- Opening date: 1933

Dam and spillways
- Height: 22.7 m (74 ft)
- Length: 190 m (620 ft)

Reservoir
- Total capacity: 300,000 m^{3} (11,000,000 cu ft)
- Catchment area: 4.5 km^{2} (1.7 sq mi)
- Surface area: 5 hectares (12 acres)

Nuppanosawa Dam (Japanese: ヌッパの沢ダム) is an earthfill dam located in Hokkaido Prefecture in Japan. The dam is used for irrigation. The catchment area of the dam is 4.5 km^{2}. The dam impounds about 5 ha of land when full and can store 300 thousand cubic meters of water. The construction of the dam was started on 1931 and completed in 1933.
