= Higashisakuraoka No.1 Dam =

Dam in Hokkaido Prefecture, Japan

- Location within Japan
- Interactive map of Higashisakuraoka No.1 Dam
- Location: Hokkaido Prefecture, Japan
- Coordinates: 43°46′43″N 142°31′11″E
- Construction began: 1912
- Opening date: 1913

Dam and spillways
- Height: 17.4 m (57 ft)
- Length: 292 m (958 ft)

Reservoir
- Total capacity: 548 thousand cubic meters
- Catchment area: 5.8 sq. km
- Surface area: 7 hectares

Higashisakuraoka No.1 Dam (Japanese: 東桜岡第一ダム) is an earthfill dam located in Hokkaido Prefecture in Japan. The dam is used for irrigation. The catchment area of the dam is 5.8 km^{2}. The dam impounds about 7 ha of land when full and can store 548 thousand cubic meters of water. The construction of the dam was started on 1912 and completed in 1913.
