= Chitose No.4 Dam =

Dam in Hokkaido Prefecture, Japan

- Location within Japan
- Interactive map of Chitose No.4 Dam
- Location: Hokkaido Prefecture, Japan
- Coordinates: 42°48′15″N 141°33′21″E
- Opening date: 1919

Dam and spillways
- Height: 21.9 m (72 ft)
- Length: 102.4 m (336 ft)

Reservoir
- Total capacity: 2298 thousand cubic meters
- Catchment area: 294 sq. km
- Surface area: 39 hectares

Chitose No.4 Dam (Japanese: 千歳第四ダム) is a gravity dam located in Hokkaido Prefecture in Japan. The dam is used for power production. The catchment area of the dam is 294 km^{2}. The dam impounds about 39 ha of land when full and can store 2298 thousand cubic meters of water. The construction of the dam was completed in 1919.
