= Biraotori Dam =

Dam in Hokkaido Prefecture, Japan

- Location within Japan
- Interactive map of Biraotori Dam
- Location: Hokkaido Prefecture, Japan
- Coordinates: 42°40′49″N 142°23′10″E
- Construction began: 1973
- Opening date: 2021

Dam and spillways
- Height: 55 m (180 ft)
- Length: 350 m (1,150 ft)

Reservoir
- Total capacity: 45800 thousand cubic meters
- Catchment area: 234 sq. km
- Surface area: 310 hectares

Biraotori Dam (Japanese: 平取ダム) is a gravity dam located in Hokkaido Prefecture in Japan. The dam is used for flood control and water supply. The catchment area of the dam is 234 km^{2}. The dam impounds about 310 ha of land when full and can store 45800 thousand cubic meters of water. The construction of the dam was started on 1973 and completed in 2021.
