= Satsunaigawa Dam =

Dam in Hokkaido Prefecture, Japan

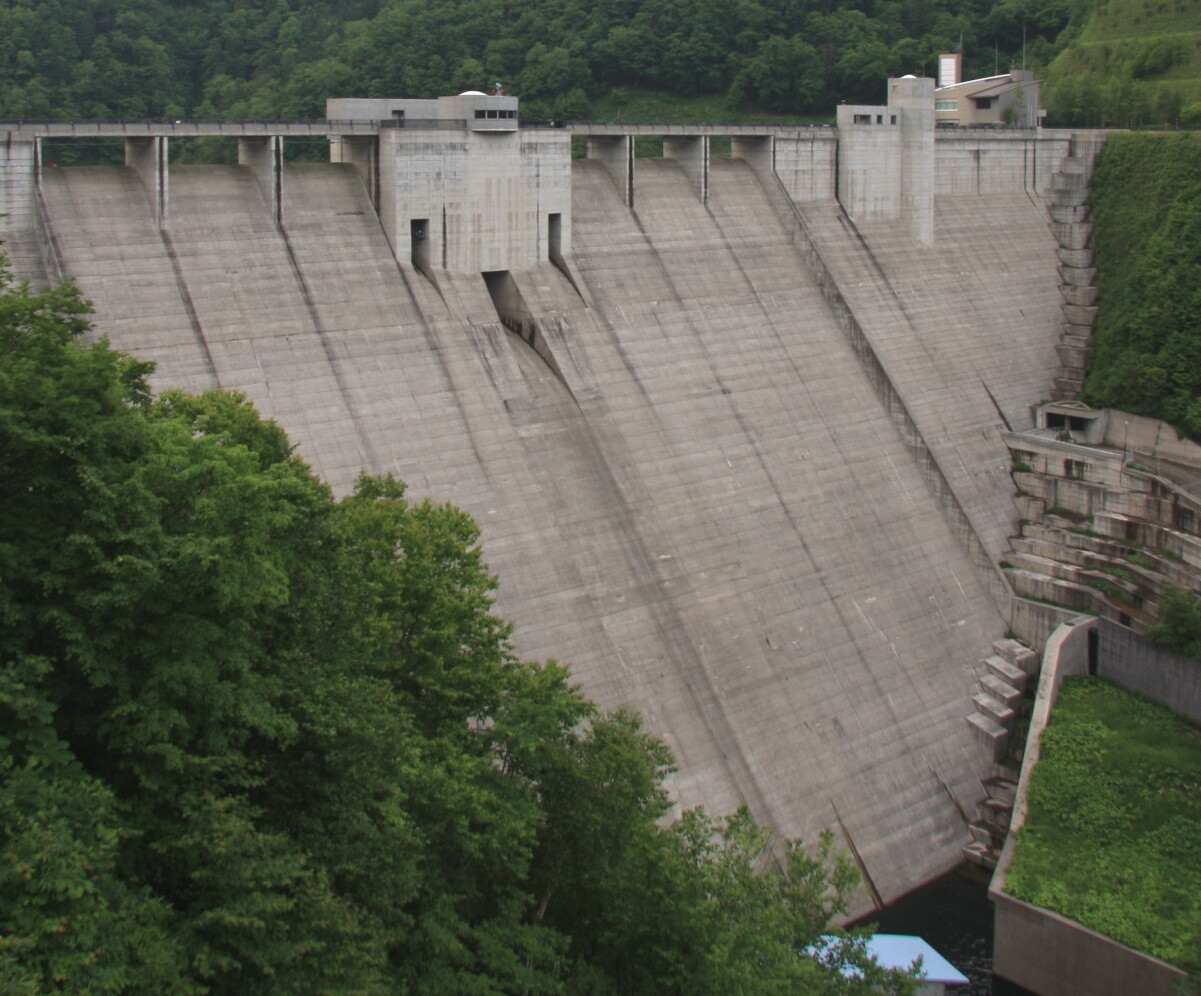

- Location within Japan
- Location: Hokkaido Prefecture, Japan
- Coordinates: 42°35′18″N 142°55′22″E
- Construction began: 1981
- Opening date: 1998

Dam and spillways
- Height: 114 m (374 ft)
- Length: 300 m (980 ft)

Reservoir
- Total capacity: 54,000,000 m^{3} (1.9×10^{9} cu ft)
- Catchment area: 117.7 km^{2} (45.4 sq mi)
- Surface area: 170 hectares (420 acres)

Satsunaigawa Dam (Japanese: 札内川ダム) is a gravity dam located in Hokkaido Prefecture in Japan. The dam is used for flood control, irrigation, water supply and power production. The catchment area of the dam is 117.7 km^{2}. The dam impounds about 170 ha of land when full and can store 54000 thousand cubic meters of water. The construction of the dam was started on 1981 and completed in 1998.
