= Koshi Dam =

Dam in Hokkaido Prefecture, Japan

- Location within Japan
- Location: Hokkaido Prefecture, Japan
- Coordinates: 44°3′16″N 142°39′00″E
- Construction began: 1934
- Opening date: 1937

Dam and spillways
- Height: 16.3 m (53 ft)
- Length: 180 m (590 ft)

Reservoir
- Total capacity: 1316 thousand cubic meters
- Catchment area: 10.4 sq. km
- Surface area: 26 hectares

Koshi Dam (Japanese: 甲子ダム) is an earthfill dam located in Hokkaido Prefecture in Japan. The dam is used for irrigation. The catchment area of the dam is 10.4 km^{2}. The dam impounds about 26 ha of land when full and can store 1316 thousand cubic meters of water. The construction of the dam was started on 1934 and completed in 1937.
