= Iwashimizu Dam =

Dam in Hokkaido Prefecture, Japan

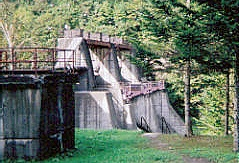

- Location within Japan
- Interactive map of Iwashimizu Dam
- Location: Hokkaido Prefecture, Japan
- Coordinates: 42°32′37″N 142°32′13″E
- Opening date: 1959

Dam and spillways
- Height: 30 m (98 ft)
- Length: 124.2 m (407 ft)

Reservoir
- Total capacity: 1814 thousand cubic meters
- Catchment area: 339.2 sq. km
- Surface area: 19 hectares

Iwashimizu Dam (Japanese: 岩清水ダム) is a gravity dam located in Hokkaido Prefecture in Japan. The dam is used for power production. The catchment area of the dam is 339.2 km^{2}. The dam impounds about 19 ha of land when full and can store 1814 thousand cubic meters of water. The construction of the dam was completed in 1959.
