= Ninosawa Dam =

Dam in Hokkaido Prefecture, Japan

- Location within Japan
- Location: Hokkaido Prefecture, Japan
- Coordinates: 43°7′26″N 141°50′48″E
- Construction began: 1923
- Opening date: 1925

Dam and spillways
- Height: 18.4 m (60 ft)
- Length: 125.1 m (410 ft)

Reservoir
- Total capacity: 304 thousand cubic meters
- Catchment area: 0.9 sq. km
- Surface area: 5 hectares

Ninosawa Dam (Japanese: 二の沢ダム) is an earthfill dam located in Hokkaido Prefecture in Japan. The dam is used for irrigation. The catchment area of the dam is 0.9 km^{2}. The dam impounds about 5 ha of land when full and can store 304 thousand cubic meters of water. The construction of the dam was started on 1923 and completed in 1925.
