= Syunbetsu Dam =

Dam in Hokkaido Prefecture, Japan

- Location within Japan
- Location: Hokkaido Prefecture, Japan
- Coordinates: 42°32′48″N 142°35′32″E
- Construction began: 1960
- Opening date: 1963

Dam and spillways
- Height: 27 m (89 ft)
- Length: 90 m (300 ft)

Reservoir
- Total capacity: 1,430,000 m^{3} (50,000,000 cu ft)
- Catchment area: 469.4 km^{2} (181.2 sq mi)
- Surface area: 17 hectares (42 acres)

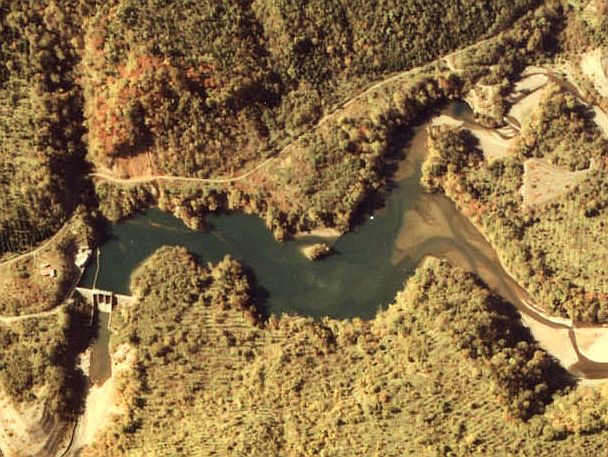

Syunbetsu Dam (Japanese: 春別ダム) is a gravity dam located in Hokkaido Prefecture in Japan. The dam is used for power production. The catchment area of the dam is 469.4 km^{2}. The dam impounds about 17 ha of land when full and can store 1430 thousand cubic meters of water. The construction of the dam was started on 1960 and completed in 1963.
