= Numata Dam =

Dam in Hokkaido Prefecture, Japan

- Location within Japan
- Location: Hokkaido Prefecture, Japan
- Coordinates: 43°54′40″N 141°55′35″E
- Construction began: 1972
- Opening date: 1991

Dam and spillways
- Height: 44.9 m (147 ft)
- Length: 395 m (1,296 ft)

Reservoir
- Total capacity: 34,800,000 m^{3} (1.23×10^{9} cu ft)
- Catchment area: 62.6 km^{2} (24.2 sq mi)
- Surface area: 277 hectares (680 acres)

Numata Dam (Japanese: 沼田ダム) is a rockfill dam located in Hokkaido Prefecture in Japan. The dam is used for irrigation and water supply. The catchment area of the dam is 62.6 km^{2}. The dam impounds about 277 ha of land when full and can store 34800 thousand cubic meters of water. The construction of the dam was started on 1972 and completed in 1991.
