= Maedanosawa Dam =

Dam in Hokkaido Prefecture, Japan

- Location within Japan
- Location: Hokkaido Prefecture, Japan
- Coordinates: 43°13′09″N 141°51′38″E
- Opening date: 1927

Dam and spillways
- Height: 16.5 m (54 ft)
- Length: 95 m (312 ft)

Reservoir
- Total capacity: 238 thousand cubic meters
- Catchment area: 0.9 sq. km
- Surface area: 3 hectares

Maedanosawa Dam (Japanese: 前田の沢ダム) is an earthfill dam located in Hokkaido Prefecture in Japan. The dam is used for irrigation. The catchment area of the dam is 0.9 km^{2}. The dam impounds about 3 ha of land when full and can store 238 thousand cubic meters of water. The construction of the dam was completed in 1927.
