= Furuume Dam =

Dam in Hokkaido Prefecture, Japan

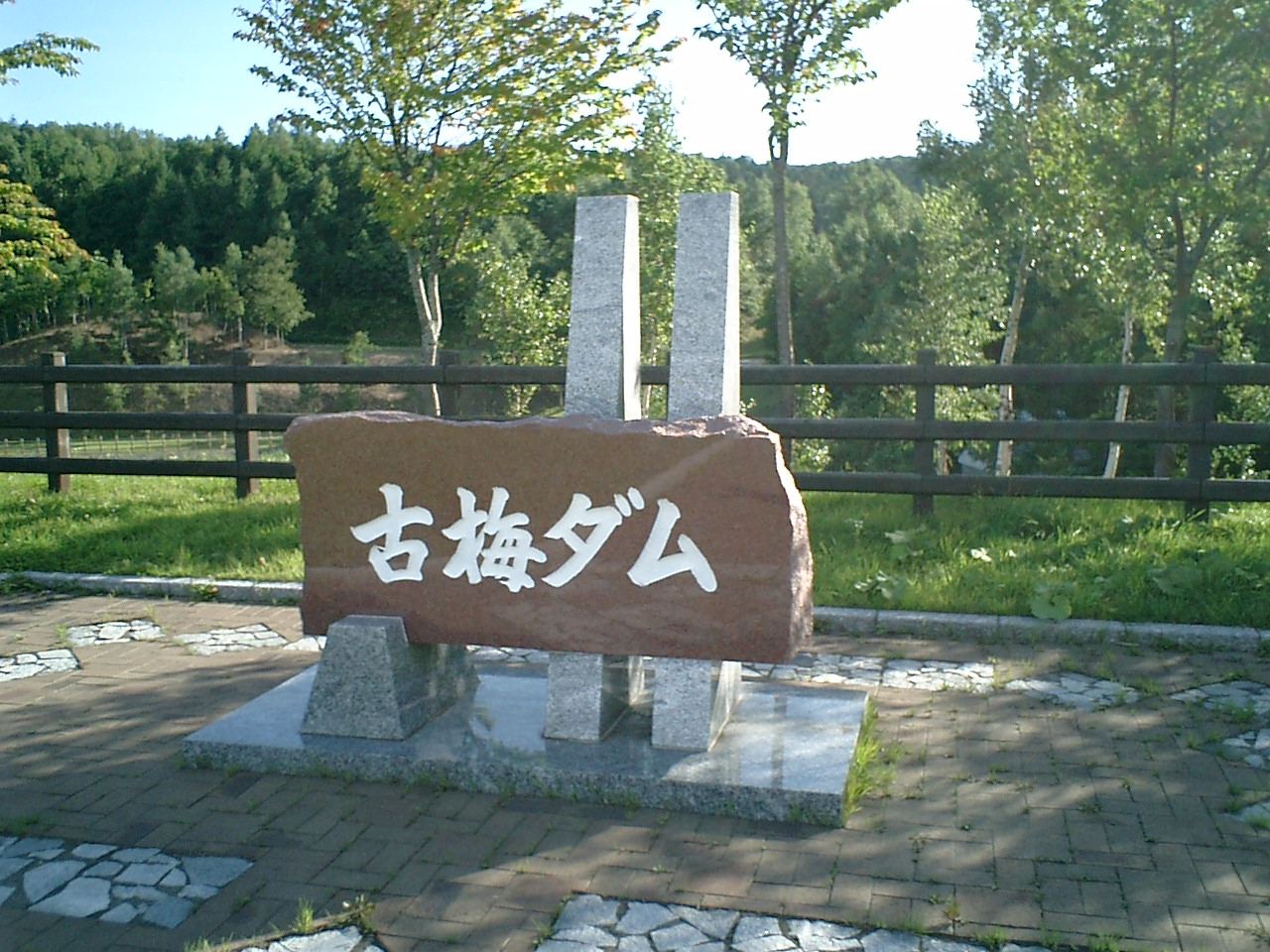

- Location within Japan
- Interactive map of Furuume Dam
- Location: Hokkaido Prefecture, Japan
- Coordinates: 43°41′56″N 144°13′35″E
- Construction began: 1972
- Opening date: 1996

Dam and spillways
- Height: 48 m (157 ft)
- Length: 215.9 m (708 ft)

Reservoir
- Total capacity: 3500 thousand cubic meters
- Catchment area: 15 sq. km
- Surface area: 29 hectares

Furuume Dam (Japanese: 古梅ダム) is a rockfill dam located in Hokkaido Prefecture in Japan. The dam is used for irrigation. The catchment area of the dam is 15 km^{2}. The dam impounds about 29 ha of land when full and can store 3500 thousand cubic meters of water. The construction of the dam was started on 1972 and completed in 1996.
