= Horomangawa No.3 Dam =

Dam in Hokkaido Prefecture, Japan

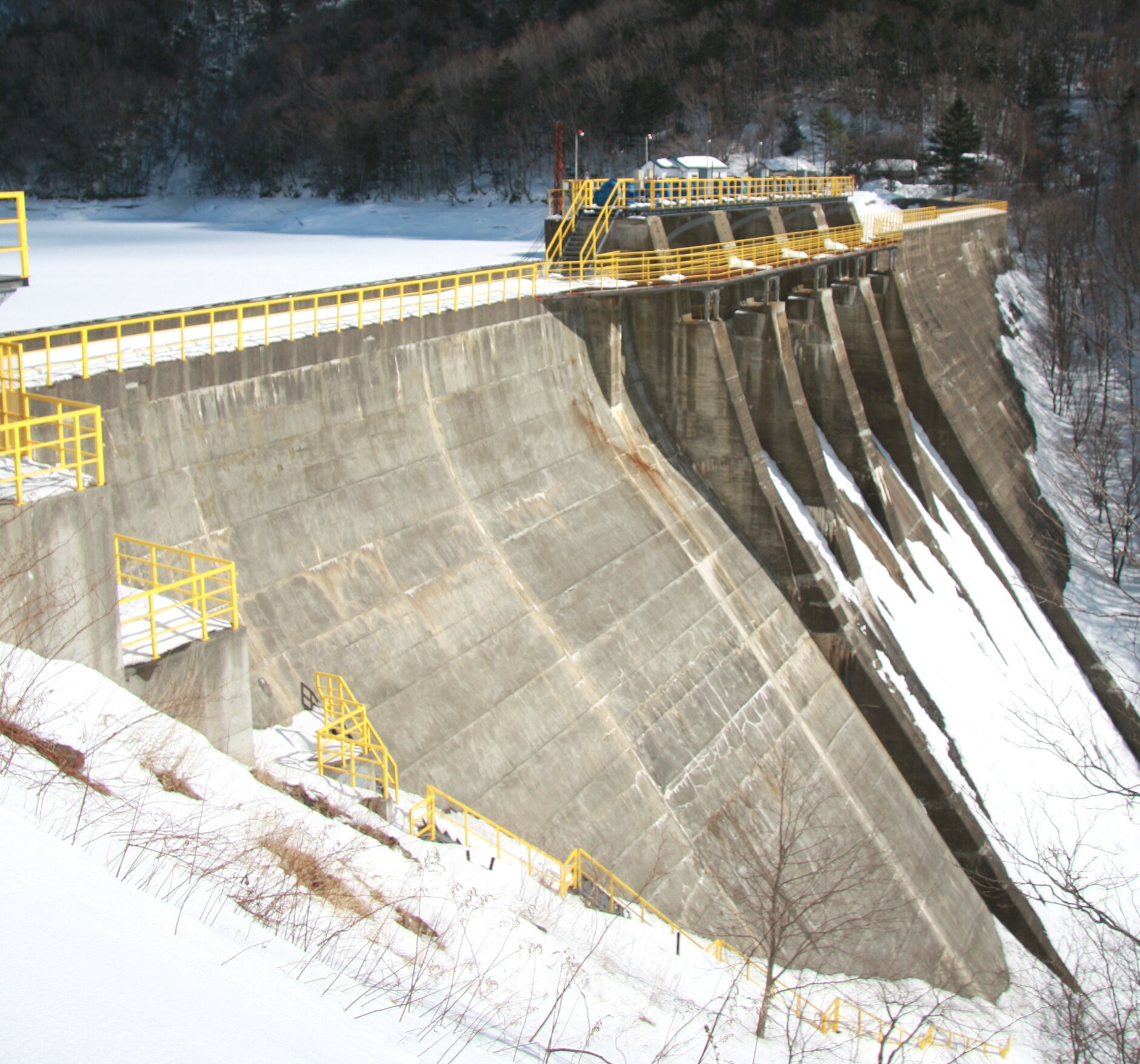

- Location within Japan
- Interactive map of Horomangawa No.3 Dam
- Location: Hokkaido Prefecture, Japan
- Coordinates: 42°7′30″N 143°4′11″E
- Construction began: 1952
- Opening date: 1954

Dam and spillways
- Height: 42.5 m (139 ft)
- Length: 186.3 m (611 ft)

Reservoir
- Total capacity: 15379 thousand cubic meters
- Catchment area: 147 sq. km
- Surface area: 121 hectares

Horomangawa No.3 Dam (Japanese: 幌満川第３ダム) is a gravity dam located in Hokkaido Prefecture in Japan. The dam is used for power production. The catchment area of the dam is 147 km^{2}. The dam impounds about 121 ha of land when full and can store 15379 thousand cubic meters of water. The construction of the dam was started on 1952 and completed in 1954.
