= Shiriuchi Dam =

Dam in Hokkaido Prefecture, Japan

- Location within Japan
- Location: Hokkaido Prefecture, Japan
- Coordinates: 41°36′45″N 140°18′03″E
- Construction began: 1980
- Opening date: 1993

Dam and spillways
- Height: 40.5 m (133 ft)
- Length: 321 m (1,053 ft)

Reservoir
- Total capacity: 6,500,000 m^{3} (230,000,000 cu ft)
- Catchment area: 15.1 km^{2} (5.8 sq mi)
- Surface area: 46 hectares (110 acres)

Shiriuchi Dam (Japanese: 知内ダム) is a gravity dam located in Hokkaido Prefecture in Japan. The dam is used for irrigation. The catchment area of the dam is 15.1 km^{2}. The dam impounds about 46 ha of land when full and can store 6500 thousand cubic meters of water. The construction of the dam was started on 1980 and completed in 1993.
