= Nishisatsunai Dam =

Dam in Hokkaido Prefecture, Japan

- Location within Japan
- Location: Hokkaido Prefecture, Japan
- Coordinates: 42°38′27″N 143°4′13″E
- Construction began: 1979
- Opening date: 1994

Dam and spillways
- Height: 21 m (69 ft)
- Length: 184 m (604 ft)

Reservoir
- Total capacity: 946,000 m^{3} (33,400,000 cu ft)
- Catchment area: 5.8 km^{2} (2.2 sq mi)
- Surface area: 18 hectares (44 acres)

Nishisatsunai Dam (Japanese: 西札内ダム) is a gravity dam located in Hokkaido Prefecture in Japan. The dam is used for flood control. The catchment area of the dam is 5.8 km^{2}. The dam impounds about 18 ha of land when full and can store 946 thousand cubic meters of water. The construction of the dam was started on 1979 and completed in 1994.
