= Butoku Dam =

Dam in Hokkaido Prefecture, Japan

- Location within Japan
- Interactive map of Butoku Dam
- Location: Hokkaido Prefecture, Japan
- Coordinates: 44°12′24″N 142°28′43″E
- Opening date: 1929

Dam and spillways
- Height: 21.5 m (71 ft)
- Length: 358 m (1,175 ft)

Reservoir
- Total capacity: 2752 thousand cubic meters
- Catchment area: 11.3 sq. km
- Surface area: 34 hectares

Butoku Dam (Japanese: 武徳ダム) is an earthfill dam located in Hokkaido Prefecture in Japan. The dam is used for irrigation. The catchment area of the dam is 11.3 km^{2}. The dam impounds about 34 ha of land when full and can store 2752 thousand cubic meters of water. The construction of the dam was completed in 1929.
