= Komagatake Dam =

Dam in Hokkaido Prefecture, Japan

- Location within Japan
- Location: Hokkaido Prefecture, Japan
- Coordinates: 42°3′46″N 140°30′12″E
- Construction began: 1970
- Opening date: 1984

Dam and spillways
- Height: 43.6 m (143 ft)
- Length: 72 m (236 ft)

Reservoir
- Total capacity: 3300 thousand cubic meters
- Catchment area: 48.8 sq. km
- Surface area: 25 hectares

Komagatake Dam (Japanese: 駒ヶ岳ダム) is a gravity dam located in Hokkaido Prefecture in Japan. The dam is used for irrigation. The catchment area of the dam is 48.8 km^{2}. The dam impounds about 25 ha of land when full and can store 3300 thousand cubic meters of water. The construction of the dam was started on 1970 and completed in 1984.
