= Chureppu Dam =

Dam in Hokkaido Prefecture, Japan

- Location within Japan
- Interactive map of Chureppu Dam
- Location: Hokkaido Prefecture, Japan
- Coordinates: 44°16′59″N 142°31′04″E
- Construction began: 1926
- Opening date: 1930

Dam and spillways
- Height: 18.5 m (61 ft)
- Length: 310 m (1,020 ft)

Reservoir
- Total capacity: 2405 thousand cubic meters
- Catchment area: 22.5 sq. km
- Surface area: 54 hectares

Chureppu Dam (Japanese: 忠烈布ダム) is an earthfill dam located in Hokkaido Prefecture in Japan. The dam is used for irrigation. The catchment area of the dam is 22.5 km^{2}. The dam impounds about 54 ha of land when full and can store 2405 thousand cubic meters of water. The construction of the dam was started on 1926 and completed in 1930.
