= Goryo Dam =

Dam in Hokkaido Prefecture, Japan

- Location within Japan
- Interactive map of Goryo Dam
- Location: Hokkaido Prefecture, Japan
- Coordinates: 44°14′33″N 142°30′00″E
- Opening date: 1986

Dam and spillways
- Height: 23.9 m (78 ft)
- Length: 606 m (1,988 ft)

Reservoir
- Total capacity: 5780 thousand cubic meters
- Catchment area: 45.9 sq. km
- Surface area: 83 hectares

Goryo Dam (Japanese: 御料ダム) is a rockfill dam located in Hokkaido Prefecture in Japan. The dam is used for irrigation. The catchment area of the dam is 45.9 km^{2}. The dam impounds about 83 ha of land when full and can store 5780 thousand cubic meters of water. The construction of the dam was completed in 1986.
