= Futagawa Dam =

Dam in Hokkaido Prefecture, Japan

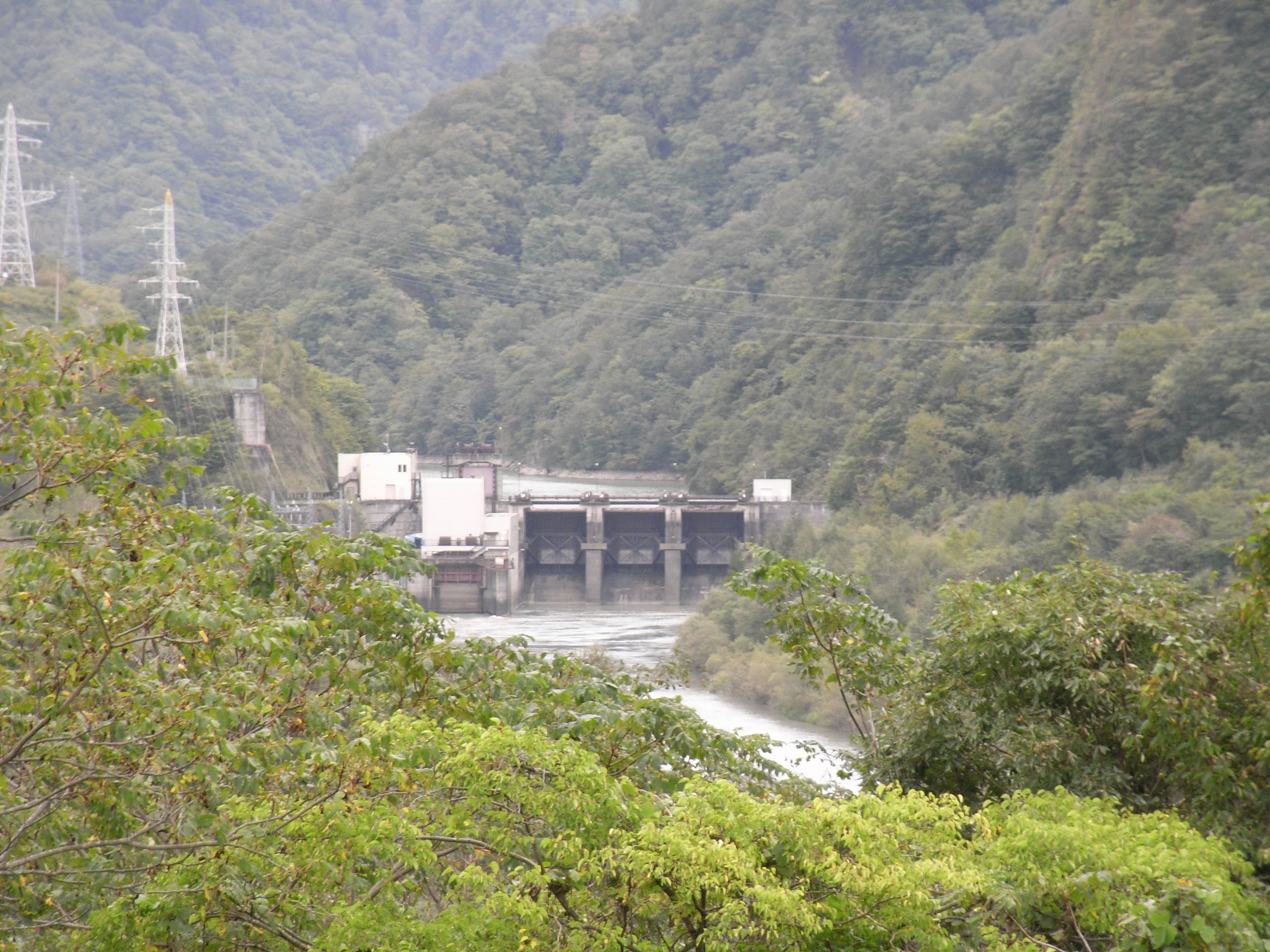

- Location within Japan
- Interactive map of Futagawa Dam
- Location: Hokkaido Prefecture, Japan
- Coordinates: 42°25′04″N 142°32′46″E
- Construction began: 1976
- Opening date: 1979

Dam and spillways
- Height: 30.5 m (100 ft)
- Length: 110 m (360 ft)

Reservoir
- Total capacity: 1620 thousand cubic meters
- Catchment area: 878.4 sq. km
- Surface area: 25 hectares

Futagawa Dam (Japanese: 双川ダム) is a gravity dam located in Hokkaido Prefecture in Japan. The dam is used for power production. The catchment area of the dam is 878.4 km^{2}. The dam impounds about 25 ha of land when full and can store 1620 thousand cubic meters of water. The construction of the dam was started on 1976 and completed in 1979.
