= Makomanai Dam =

Dam in Hokkaido Prefecture, Japan

- Location within Japan
- Location: Hokkaido Prefecture, Japan
- Coordinates: 42°28′56″N 139°54′35″E
- Construction began: 1965
- Opening date: 1986

Dam and spillways
- Height: 34.3 m (113 ft)
- Length: 234.6 m (770 ft)

Reservoir
- Total capacity: 6480 thousand cubic meters
- Catchment area: 49.5 sq. km
- Surface area: 56 hectares

Makomanai Dam (Japanese: 真駒内ダム) is a rockfill dam located in Hokkaido Prefecture in Japan. The dam is used for irrigation. The catchment area of the dam is 49.5 km^{2}. The dam impounds about 56 ha of land when full and can store 6480 thousand cubic meters of water. The construction of the dam was started on 1965 and completed in 1986.
