= Nisshin Dam =

Dam in Hokkaido Prefecture, Japan

- Location within Japan
- Location: Hokkaido Prefecture, Japan
- Coordinates: 43°29′23″N 142°31′09″E
- Opening date: 1973

Dam and spillways
- Height: 29.5 m (97 ft)
- Length: 230.3 m (756 ft)

Reservoir
- Total capacity: 4,500,000 m^{3} (160,000,000 cu ft)
- Catchment area: 91.3 km^{2} (35.3 sq mi)
- Surface area: 42 hectares (100 acres)

Nisshin Dam (Japanese: 日新ダム) is a rockfill dam located in Hokkaido Prefecture in Japan. The dam is used for irrigation. The catchment area of the dam is 91.3 km^{2}. The dam impounds about 42 ha of land when full and can store 4500 thousand cubic meters of water. The construction of the dam was completed in 1973.
