= Shimoniikappu Dam =

Dam in Hokkaido Prefecture, Japan

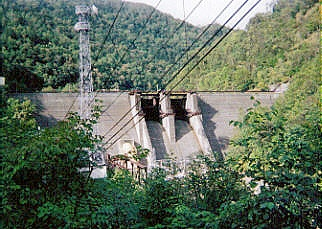

- Location within Japan
- Location: Hokkaido Prefecture, Japan
- Coordinates: 42°33′59″N 142°32′09″E
- Construction began: 1967
- Opening date: 1969

Dam and spillways
- Height: 46 m (151 ft)
- Length: 131 m (430 ft)

Reservoir
- Total capacity: 6,550,000 m^{3} (231,000,000 cu ft)
- Catchment area: 329 km^{2} (127 sq mi)
- Surface area: 49 hectares (120 acres)

Shimoniikappu Dam (Japanese: 下新冠ダム) is a gravity dam located in Hokkaido Prefecture in Japan. The dam is used for power production. The catchment area of the dam is 329 km^{2}. When full, the dam impounds approximately 49 ha of land and can store 6,550,000 cubic meters of water. Construction began in 1967 and was completed in 1969.
