= Nukabira Dam =

Dam in Hokkaido Prefecture, Japan

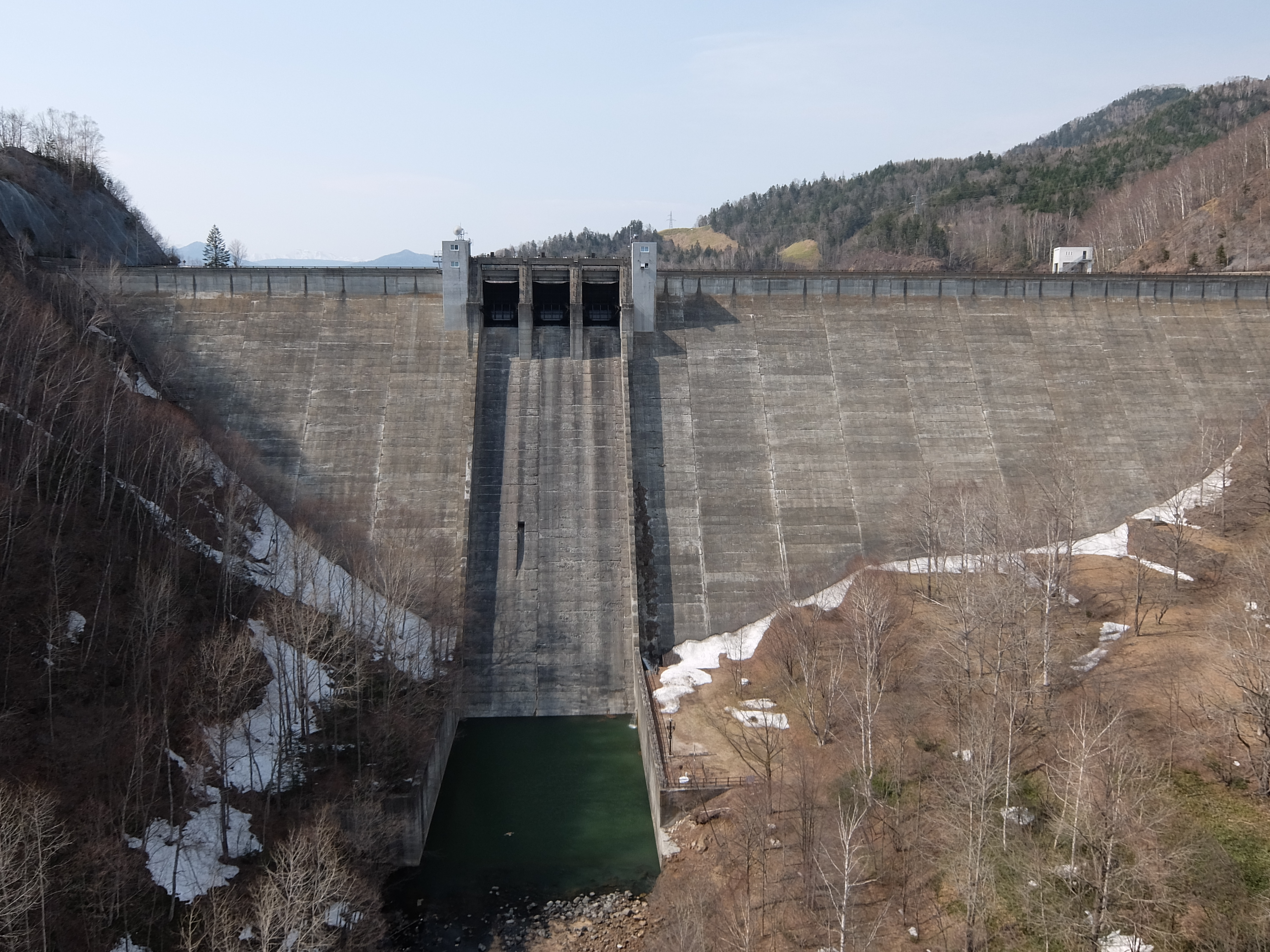

- Location within Japan
- Location: Hokkaido Prefecture, Japan
- Coordinates: 43°22′24″N 143°13′17″E
- Construction began: 1953
- Opening date: 1956

Dam and spillways
- Height: 76 m (249 ft)
- Length: 293 m (961 ft)

Reservoir
- Total capacity: 193,900,000 m^{3} (6.85×10^{9} cu ft)
- Catchment area: 387.8 km^{2} (149.7 sq mi)
- Surface area: 822 hectares (2,030 acres)

Nukabira Dam (Japanese: 糠平ダム) is a gravity dam located in Hokkaido Prefecture in Japan. The dam is used for power production. The catchment area of the dam is 387.8 km^{2}. The dam impounds about 822 ha of land when full and can store 193900 thousand cubic meters of water. The construction of the dam was started on 1953 and completed in 1956.
