= Kyoei Dam =

Dam in Hokkaido Prefecture, Japan

- Location within Japan
- Location: Hokkaido Prefecture, Japan
- Coordinates: 43°47′33″N 143°58′29″E
- Construction began: 1963
- Opening date: 1965

Dam and spillways
- Height: 18.6 m (61 ft)
- Length: 88 m (289 ft)

Reservoir
- Total capacity: 400 thousand cubic meters
- Catchment area: 5.1 sq. km
- Surface area: 7 hectares

Kyoei Dam (Japanese: 協栄ダム) is an earthfill dam located in Hokkaido Prefecture in Japan. The dam is used for irrigation. The catchment area of the dam is 5.1 km^{2}. The dam impounds about 7 ha of land when full and can store 400 thousand cubic meters of water. The construction of the dam was started on 1963 and completed in 1965.
