= Shintotsukawa Dam =

Dam in Hokkaido Prefecture, Japan

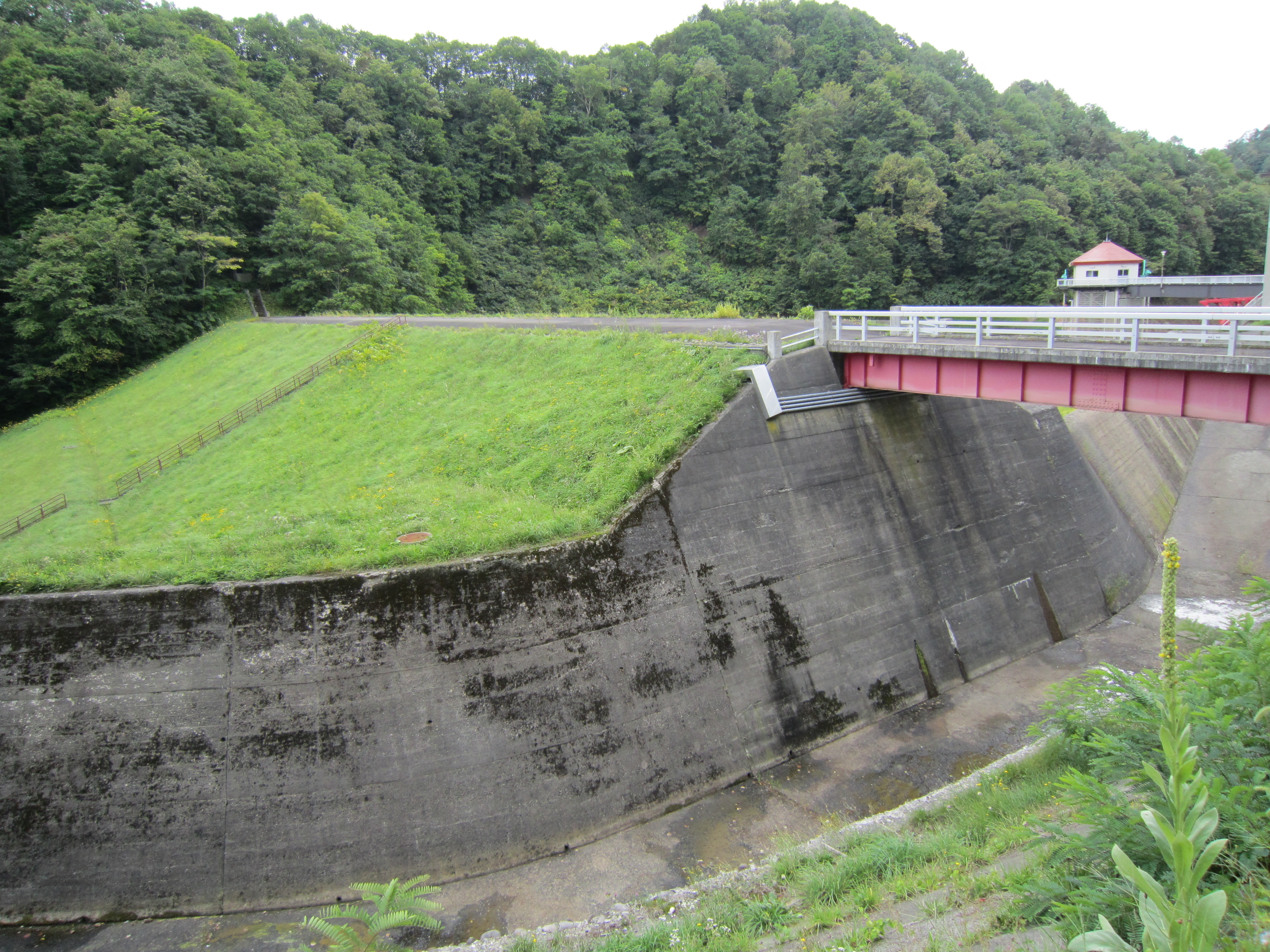

- Location within Japan
- Location: Hokkaido Prefecture, Japan
- Coordinates: 43°35′07″N 141°43′39″E
- Construction began: 1952
- Opening date: 1959

Dam and spillways
- Height: 29.2 m (96 ft)
- Length: 95.3 m (313 ft)

Reservoir
- Total capacity: 4,935,000 m^{3} (174,300,000 cu ft)
- Catchment area: 16 km^{2} (6.2 sq mi)
- Surface area: 58 hectares (140 acres)

Shintotsukawa Dam (Japanese: 新十津川ダム) is an earthfill dam located in Hokkaido Prefecture in Japan. The dam is used for irrigation. The catchment area of the dam is 16 km^{2}. The dam impounds about 58 ha of land when full and can store 4935 thousand cubic meters of water. The construction of the dam was started on 1952 and completed in 1959.
