= Fuuen Dam =

Dam in Hokkaido Prefecture, Japan

- Location within Japan
- Interactive map of Fuuen Dam
- Location: Hokkaido Prefecture, Japan
- Coordinates: 44°13′18″N 142°33′45″E
- Opening date: 1986

Dam and spillways
- Height: 33.6 m (110 ft)
- Length: 294 m (965 ft)

Reservoir
- Total capacity: 2918 thousand cubic meters
- Catchment area: 23 sq. km
- Surface area: 27 hectares

Fuuen Dam (Japanese: 風連ダム) is a rockfill dam located in Hokkaido Prefecture in Japan. The dam is used for irrigation. The catchment area of the dam is 23 km^{2}. The dam impounds about 27 ha of land when full and can store 2918 thousand cubic meters of water. The construction of the dam was completed in 1986.
