= Tokorogawa Dam =

Dam in Hokkaido Prefecture, Japan

- Location within Japan
- Location: Hokkaido Prefecture, Japan
- Coordinates: 41°58′18″N 140°49′30″E
- Opening date: 1932

Dam and spillways
- Height: 24.5 m (80 ft)
- Length: 57.9 m (190 ft)

Reservoir
- Total capacity: 79,000 m^{3} (2,800,000 cu ft)
- Catchment area: 17.3 km^{2} (6.7 sq mi)
- Surface area: 1 hectare (2.5 acres)

Tokorogawa Dam (Japanese: 常路川ダム) is a gravity dam located in Hokkaido Prefecture in Japan. The dam is used for power production. The catchment area of the dam is 17.3 km^{2}. The dam impounds about 1 ha of land when full and can store 79 thousand cubic meters of water. The construction of the dam was completed in 1932.
