= Bisei Dam =

Dam in Hokkaido Prefecture, Japan

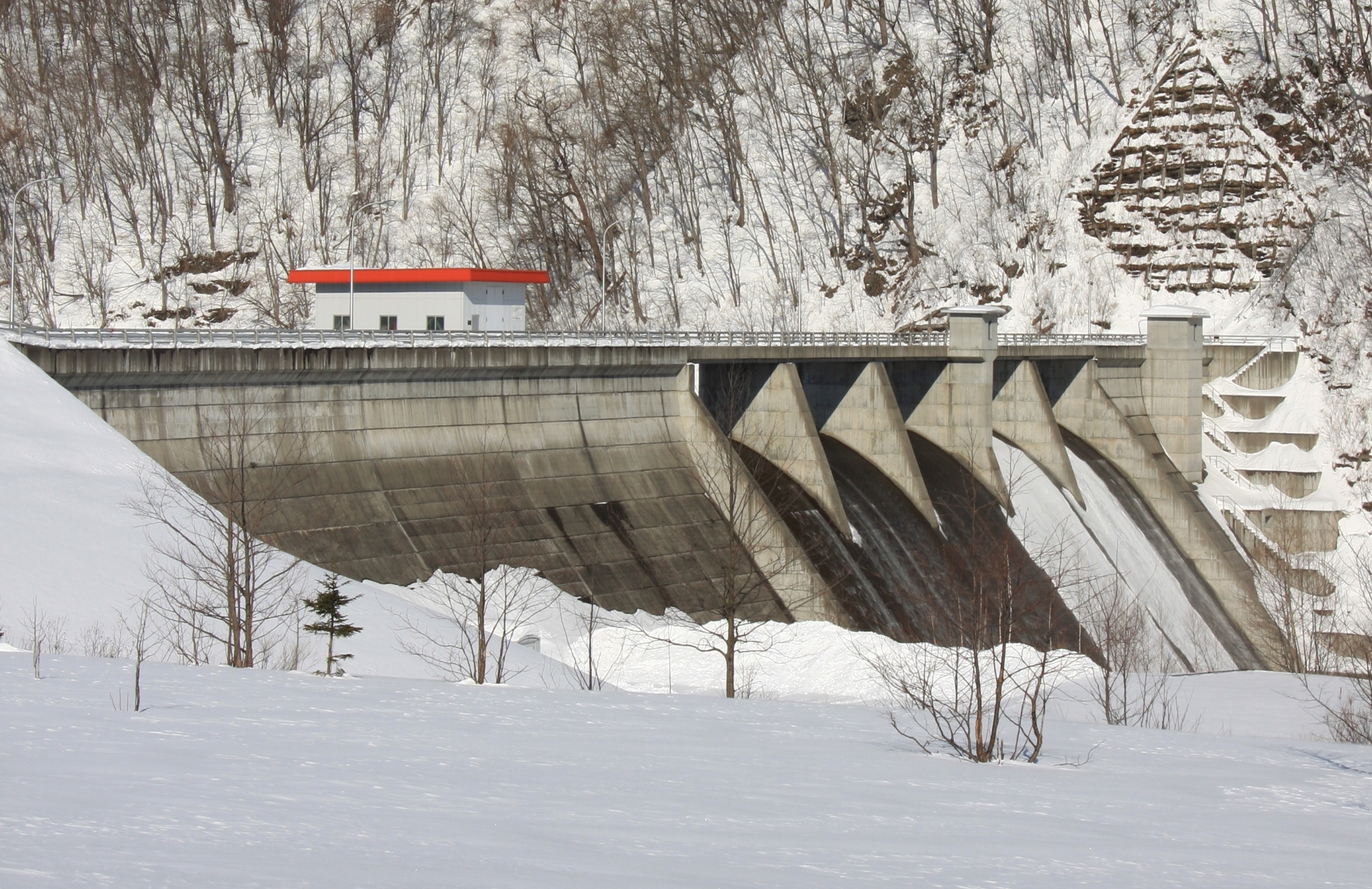

- Location within Japan
- Interactive map of Bisei Dam
- Location: Hokkaido Prefecture, Japan
- Coordinates: 42°48′24″N 142°51′07″E
- Construction began: 1975
- Opening date: 1999

Dam and spillways
- Height: 47.2 m (155 ft)
- Length: 350 m (1,150 ft)

Reservoir
- Total capacity: 9400 thousand cubic meters
- Catchment area: 83 sq. km
- Surface area: 66 hectares

Bisei Dam (Japanese: 美生ダム) is a gravity concrete & fill dam (compound) dam located in Hokkaido Prefecture in Japan. The dam is used for irrigation. The catchment area of the dam is 83 km^{2}. The dam impounds about 66 ha of land when full and can store 9400 thousand cubic meters of water. The construction of the dam was started on 1975 and completed in 1999.
