= Shimizusawa Dam =

Dam in Hokkaido Prefecture, Japan

- Location within Japan
- Location: Hokkaido Prefecture, Japan
- Coordinates: 43°0′06″N 142°1′15″E
- Opening date: 1940

Dam and spillways
- Height: 25.4 m (83 ft)
- Length: 91.8 m (301 ft)

Reservoir
- Total capacity: 5,576,000 m^{3} (196,900,000 cu ft)
- Catchment area: 534.2 km^{2} (206.3 sq mi)
- Surface area: 87 hectares (210 acres)

Shimizusawa Dam (Japanese: 清水沢ダム) is a gravity dam located in Hokkaido Prefecture in Japan. The dam is used for irrigation and power production. The catchment area of the dam is 534.2 km^{2}. The dam impounds about 87 ha of land when full and can store 5576 thousand cubic meters of water. The construction of the dam was completed in 1940.
