= Horoka Dam =

Dam in Hokkaido Prefecture, Japan

- Location within Japan
- Interactive map of Horoka Dam
- Location: Hokkaido Prefecture, Japan
- Coordinates: 43°25′49″N 143°7′54″E
- Opening date: 1965

Dam and spillways
- Height: 32 m (105 ft)
- Length: 135.5 m (445 ft)

Reservoir
- Total capacity: 493 thousand cubic meters
- Catchment area: 256.3 sq. km
- Surface area: 8 hectares

Horoka Dam (Japanese: 幌加ダム) is a rockfill dam located in Hokkaido Prefecture in Japan. The dam is used for power production. The catchment area of the dam is 256.3 square kilometres (99.0 sq mi). The dam impounds about 8 hectares (20 acres) of land when full and can store 493,000 cubic metres (17,400,000 cu ft) of water. The construction of the dam was completed in 1965.
