= Uzura Dam =

Dam in Hokkaido Prefecture, Japan

- Location within Japan
- Location: Hokkaido Prefecture, Japan
- Coordinates: 41°56′59″N 140°23′32″E
- Construction began: 1969
- Opening date: 2001

Dam and spillways
- Height: 52.2 m (171 ft)
- Length: 220 m (720 ft)

Reservoir
- Total capacity: 10,000,000 m^{3} (350,000,000 cu ft)
- Catchment area: 41.9 km^{2} (16.2 sq mi)
- Surface area: 66 hectares (160 acres)

Uzura Dam (Japanese: 鶉ダム) is a rockfill dam located in Hokkaido Prefecture in Japan. The dam is used for irrigation. The catchment area of the dam is 41.9 km^{2}. The dam impounds about 66 ha of land when full and can store 10000 thousand cubic meters of water. The construction of the dam was started on 1969 and completed in 2001.
