= Sannosawa No.2 Dam =

Dam in Hokkaido Prefecture, Japan

- Location within Japan
- Location: Hokkaido Prefecture, Japan
- Coordinates: 43°10′44″N 141°50′01″E
- Construction began: 1953
- Opening date: 1954

Dam and spillways
- Height: 16 m (52 ft)
- Length: 132.5 m (435 ft)

Reservoir
- Total capacity: 700,000 m^{3} (25,000,000 cu ft)
- Catchment area: 1.9 km^{2} (0.73 sq mi)
- Surface area: 6 hectares (15 acres)

Sannosawa No.2 Dam (Japanese: 三の沢第二ダム) is an earthfill dam located in Hokkaido Prefecture in Japan. The dam is used for irrigation. The catchment area of the dam is 1.9 km^{2}. The dam impounds about 6 ha of land when full and can store 700 thousand cubic meters of water. The construction of the dam was started on 1953 and completed in 1954.
