= Moheizawa No.2 Dam =

Dam in Hokkaido Prefecture, Japan

- Location within Japan
- Location: Hokkaido Prefecture, Japan
- Coordinates: 43°16′13″N 141°33′20″E
- Opening date: 1985

Dam and spillways
- Height: 19.8 m (65 ft)
- Length: 137.6 m (451 ft)

Reservoir
- Total capacity: 247 thousand cubic meters
- Catchment area: 0.8 sq. km
- Surface area: 4 hectares

Moheizawa No.2 Dam (Japanese: 茂平沢第二ダム) is an earthfill dam located in Hokkaido Prefecture in Japan. The dam is used for irrigation. The catchment area of the dam is 0.8 km^{2}. The dam impounds about 4 ha of land when full and can store 247 thousand cubic meters of water. The construction of the dam was completed in 1985.
