= Okinai Dam =

Dam in Hokkaido Prefecture, Japan

- Location within Japan
- Location: Hokkaido Prefecture, Japan
- Coordinates: 43°58′36″N 141°46′08″E
- Construction began: 1976
- Opening date: 1995

Dam and spillways
- Height: 29.6 m (97 ft)
- Length: 157 m (515 ft)

Reservoir
- Total capacity: 1,189,000 m^{3} (42,000,000 cu ft)
- Catchment area: 16.4 km^{2} (6.3 sq mi)
- Surface area: 14 hectares (35 acres)

Okinai Dam (Japanese: 沖内ダム) is an earthfill dam located in Hokkaido Prefecture in Japan. The dam is used for flood control and irrigation. The catchment area of the dam is 16.4 km^{2}. The dam impounds about 14 ha of land when full and can store 1189 thousand cubic meters of water. The construction of the dam was started on 1976 and completed in 1995.
