= Omu Dam =

Dam in Hokkaido Prefecture, Japan

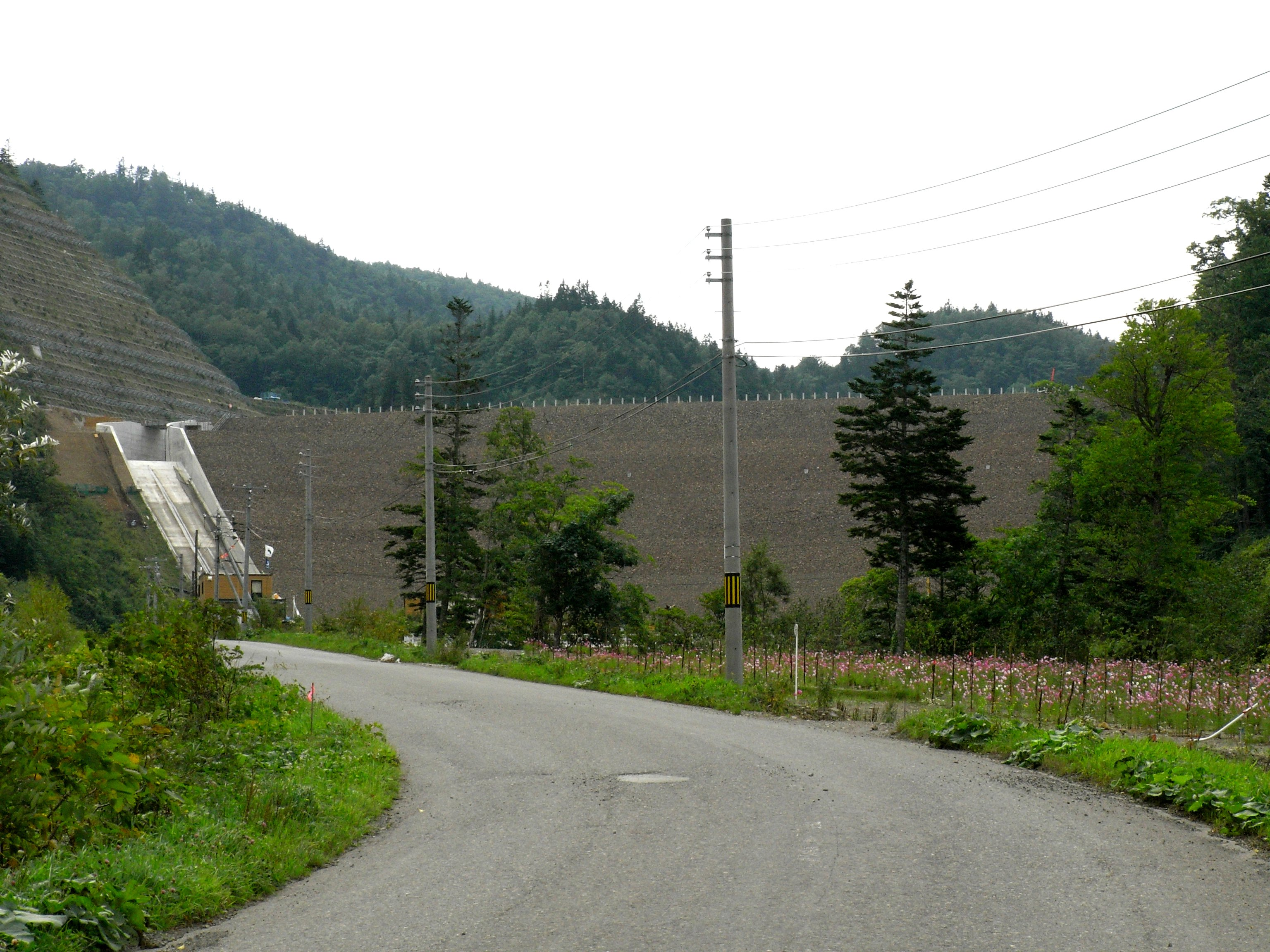

- Location within Japan
- Location: Hokkaido Prefecture, Japan
- Coordinates: 44°28′51″N 142°53′04″E
- Construction began: 1989
- Opening date: 2009

Dam and spillways
- Height: 53.6 m (176 ft)
- Length: 234 m (768 ft)

Reservoir
- Total capacity: 3,300,000 m^{3} (120,000,000 cu ft)
- Catchment area: 16.9 km^{2} (6.5 sq mi)
- Surface area: 22 hectares (54 acres)

Omu Dam (Japanese: 雄武ダム) is a rockfill dam located in Hokkaido Prefecture in Japan. The dam is used for irrigation. The catchment area of the dam is 16.9 km^{2}. The dam impounds about 22 ha of land when full and can store 3300 thousand cubic meters of water. The construction of the dam was started on 1989 and completed in 2009.
