= Ohtodo Dam =

Dam in Hokkaido Prefecture, Japan

- Location within Japan
- Location: Hokkaido Prefecture, Japan
- Coordinates: 44°5′27″N 141°43′17″E
- Construction began: 1983
- Opening date: 2003

Dam and spillways
- Height: 34 m (112 ft)
- Length: 124 m (407 ft)

Reservoir
- Total capacity: 1,729,000 m^{3} (61,100,000 cu ft)
- Catchment area: 10.2 km^{2} (3.9 sq mi)
- Surface area: 17 hectares (42 acres)

Ohtodo Dam (Japanese: 大椴ダム) is an earthfill dam located in Hokkaido Prefecture in Japan. The dam is used for flood control and irrigation. The catchment area of the dam is 10.2 km^{2}. The dam impounds about 17 ha of land when full and can store 1729 thousand cubic meters of water. The construction of the dam was started in 1983 and completed in 2003.
