= Takatomi Dam =

Dam in Hokkaido Prefecture, Japan

- Location within Japan
- Location: Hokkaido Prefecture, Japan
- Coordinates: 43°15′24″N 141°27′00″E
- Construction began: 1987
- Opening date: 2005

Dam and spillways
- Height: 17.9 m (59 ft)
- Length: 185 m (607 ft)

Reservoir
- Total capacity: 1,500,000 m^{3} (53,000,000 cu ft)
- Catchment area: 2.7 km^{2} (1.0 sq mi)
- Surface area: 22 hectares (54 acres)

Takatomi Dam (Japanese: 高富ダム（再）) is an earthfill dam located in Hokkaido Prefecture in Japan. The dam is used for flood control and irrigation. The catchment area of the dam is 2.7 km^{2}. The dam impounds about 22 ha of land when full and can store 1500 thousand cubic meters of water. The construction of the dam was started on 1987 and completed in 2005.
