= Ubaranai Dam =

Dam in Hokkaido Prefecture, Japan

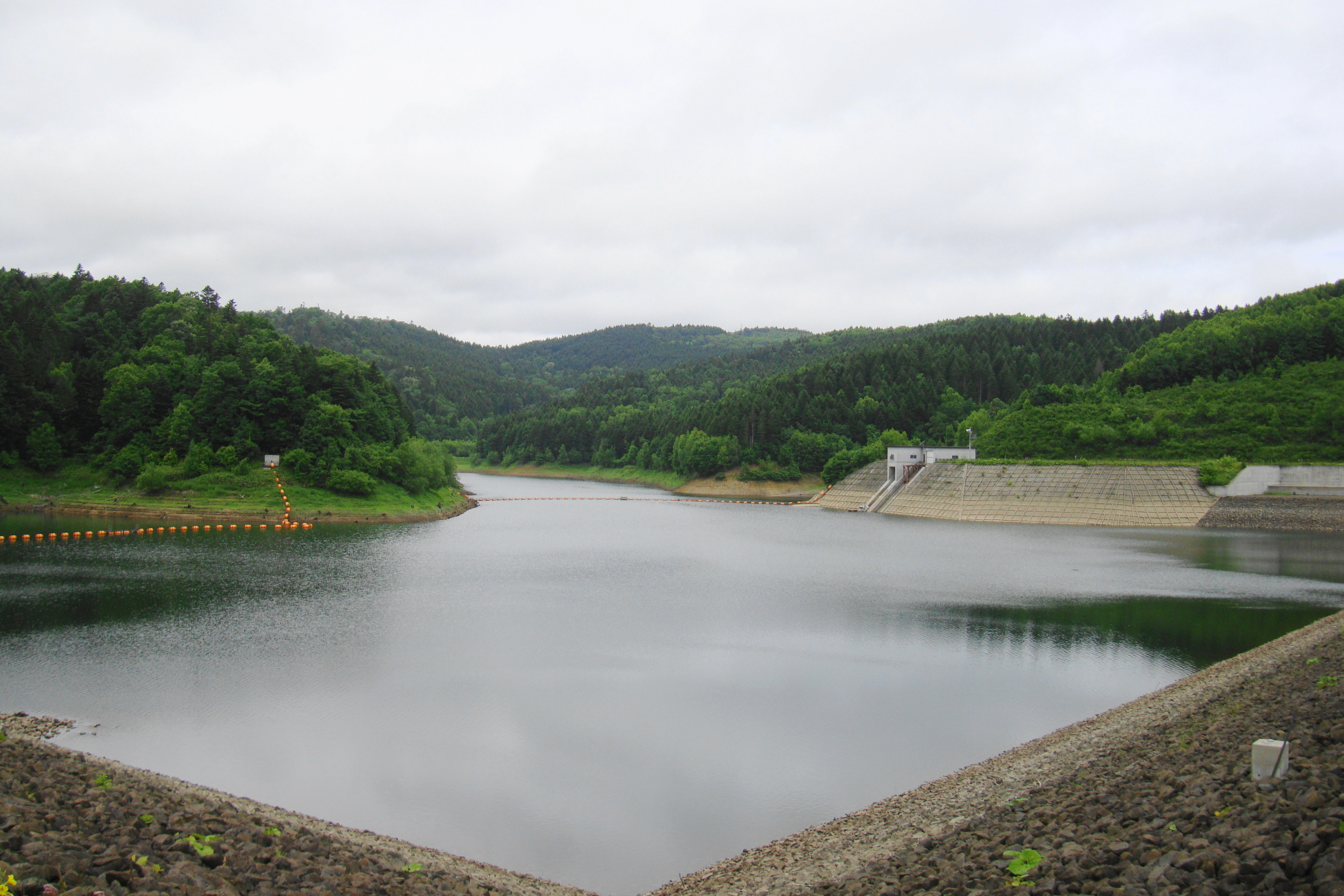

- Location within Japan
- Location: Hokkaido Prefecture, Japan
- Coordinates: 43°58′39″N 144°4′11″E
- Construction began: 1978
- Opening date: 2000

Dam and spillways
- Height: 40.5 m (133 ft)
- Length: 355 m (1,165 ft)

Reservoir
- Total capacity: 4,300,000 m^{3} (150,000,000 cu ft)
- Catchment area: 14 km^{2} (5.4 sq mi)
- Surface area: 34 hectares (84 acres)

Ubaranai Dam (Japanese: 卯原内ダム) is a rockfill dam located in Hokkaido Prefecture in Japan. The dam is used for irrigation. The catchment area of the dam is 14 km^{2}. The dam impounds about 34 ha of land when full and can store 4300 thousand cubic meters of water. The construction of the dam was started on 1978 and completed in 2000.
