= Kamui Dam =

Dam in Hokkaido Prefecture, Japan

- Location within Japan
- Interactive map of Kamui Dam
- Location: Hokkaido Prefecture, Japan
- Coordinates: 43°36′08″N 142°20′37″E
- Construction began: 1976
- Opening date: 1997

Dam and spillways
- Height: 40.4 m (133 ft)
- Length: 143.2 m (470 ft)

Reservoir
- Total capacity: 5300 thousand cubic meters
- Catchment area: 37.1 sq. km
- Surface area: 39 hectares

Kamui Dam (Japanese: 神居ダム) is a gravity dam located in Hokkaido Prefecture in Japan. The dam is used for irrigation. The catchment area of the dam is 37.1 km^{2}. The dam impounds about 39 ha of land when full and can store 5300 thousand cubic meters of water. The construction of the dam was started in 1976 and completed in 1997.
