= Monbetsu Dam =

Dam in Hokkaido Prefecture, Japan

- Location within Japan
- Location: Hokkaido Prefecture, Japan
- Coordinates: 42°32′49″N 142°12′17″E
- Opening date: 1971

Dam and spillways
- Height: 20.8 m (68 ft)
- Length: 117 m (384 ft)

Reservoir
- Total capacity: 256 thousand cubic meters
- Catchment area: 1.5 sq. km
- Surface area: 4 hectares

Monbetsu Dam (Japanese: 門別ダム) is an earthfill dam located in Hokkaido Prefecture in Japan. The dam is used for irrigation. The catchment area of the dam is 1.5 km^{2}. The dam impounds about 4 ha of land when full and can store 256 thousand cubic meters of water. The construction of the dam was completed in 1971.
