= Nisshin-Ko Dam =

Dam in Hokkaido Prefecture, Japan

- Location within Japan
- Location: Hokkaido Prefecture, Japan
- Coordinates: 43°31′15″N 141°48′23″E
- Opening date: 1924

Dam and spillways
- Height: 26.5 m (87 ft)
- Length: 213.5 m (700 ft)

Reservoir
- Total capacity: 842,000 m^{3} (29,700,000 cu ft)
- Catchment area: 2.9 km^{2} (1.1 sq mi)
- Surface area: 9 hectares (22 acres)

Nisshin-Ko Dam (Japanese: 日進甲号ダム) is an earthfill dam located in Hokkaido Prefecture in Japan. The dam is used for irrigation. The catchment area of the dam is 2.9 km^{2}. The dam impounds about 9 ha of land when full and can store 842 thousand cubic meters of water. The construction of the dam was completed in 1924.
