= Ariake Dam =

Dam in Hokkaido Prefecture, Japan

- Location within Japan
- Interactive map of Ariake Dam
- Location: Hokkaido Prefecture, Japan
- Coordinates: 44°24′05″N 141°51′03″E
- Construction began: 1967
- Opening date: 1971

Dam and spillways
- Height: 21.7 m (71 ft)
- Length: 250 m (820 ft)

Reservoir
- Total capacity: 2440 thousand cubic meters
- Catchment area: 19.5 sq. km
- Surface area: 33 hectares

Ariake Dam (Japanese: 有明ダム) is a gravity dam located in Hokkaido Prefecture in Japan. The dam is used for flood control. The catchment area of the dam is 19.5 km^{2}. The dam impounds about 33 ha of land when full and can store 2440 thousand cubic meters of water. The construction of the dam was started on 1967 and completed in 1971.
