= Seidai Dam =

Dam in Hokkaido Prefecture, Japan

- Location within Japan
- Location: Hokkaido Prefecture, Japan
- Coordinates: 43°36′43″N 142°31′27″E
- Opening date: 1937

Dam and spillways
- Height: 29.7 m (97 ft)
- Length: 485.4 m (1,593 ft)

Reservoir
- Total capacity: 3,767,000 m^{3} (133,000,000 cu ft)
- Catchment area: sq. km
- Surface area: 51 hectares (130 acres)

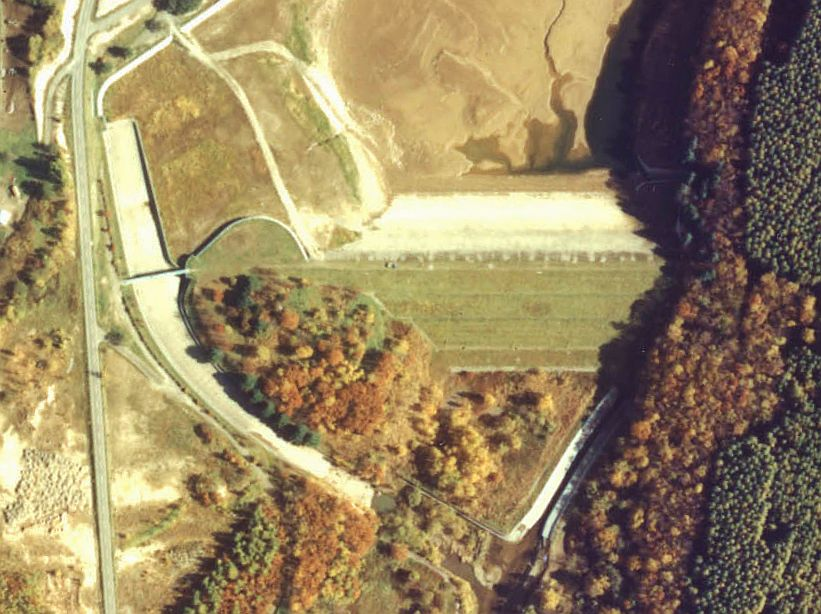
Seidai Dam, 1977

Seidai Dam (Japanese: 聖台ダム) is an earthfill dam located in Hokkaido Prefecture in Japan. The dam is used for irrigation. The dam impounds about 51 ha of land when full and can store 3767 thousand cubic meters of water. The construction of the dam was completed in 1937.
