= Ehoro Dam =

Dam in Hokkaido Prefecture, Japan

- Location within Japan
- Interactive map of Ehoro Dam
- Location: Hokkaido Prefecture, Japan
- Coordinates: 43°29′32″N 142°25′01″E
- Opening date: 1932

Dam and spillways
- Height: 19.9 m (65 ft)
- Length: 146 m (479 ft)

Reservoir
- Total capacity: 352 thousand cubic meters
- Catchment area: 4.9 sq. km
- Surface area: 5 hectares

Ehoro Dam (Japanese: 江幌ダム) is an earthfill dam located in Hokkaido Prefecture in Japan. The dam is used for irrigation. The catchment area of the dam is 4.9 km^{2}. The dam impounds about 5 ha of land when full and can store 352 thousand cubic meters of water. The construction of the dam was completed in 1932.
