= Aoyama Dam =

Dam in Hokkaido Prefecture, Japan

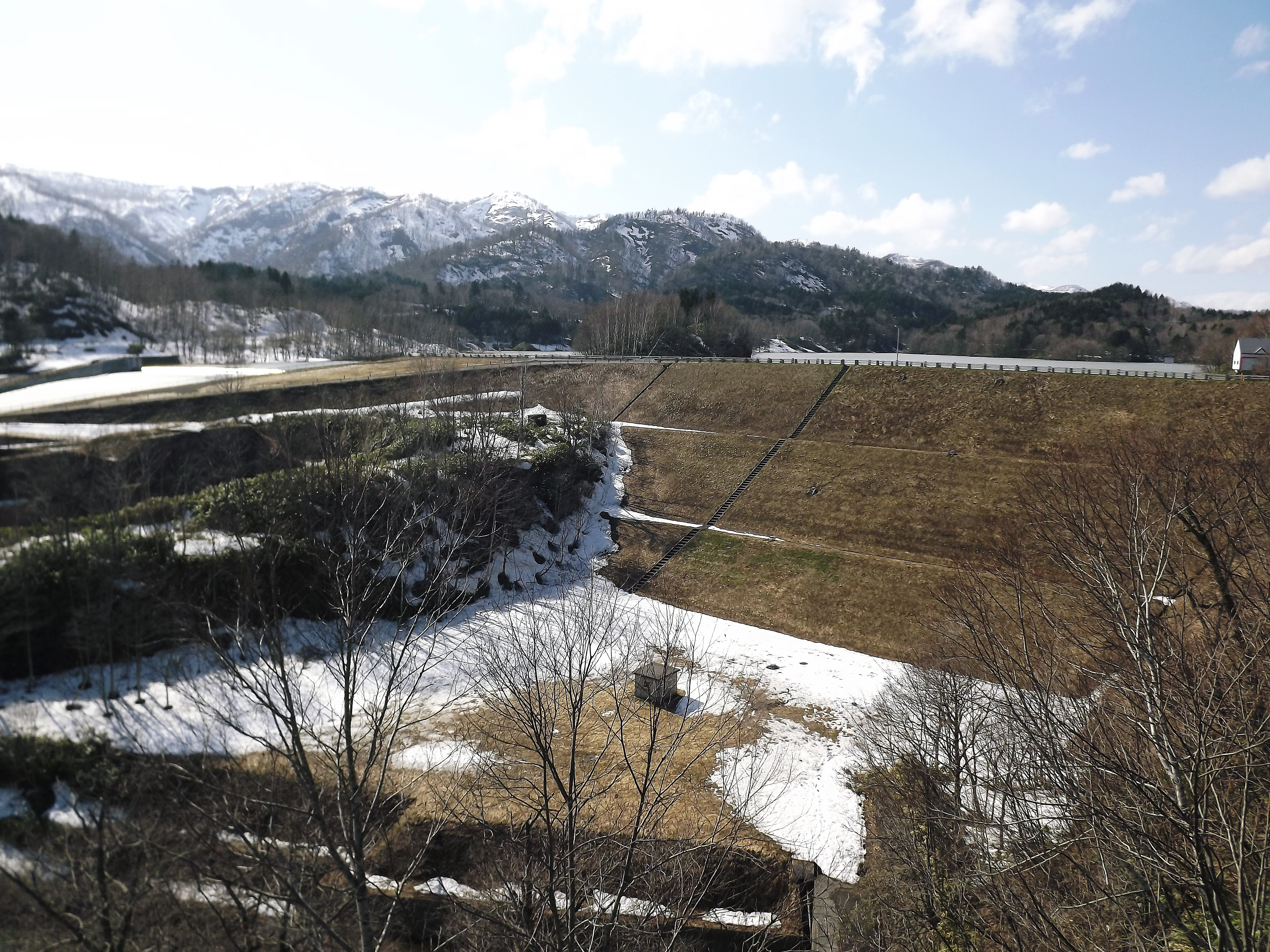

- Location within Japan
- Interactive map of Aoyama Dam
- Location: Hokkaido Prefecture, Japan
- Coordinates: 43°28′40″N 141°35′41″E
- Construction began: 1951
- Opening date: 1962

Dam and spillways
- Height: 35.5 m (116 ft)
- Length: 239.5 m (786 ft)

Reservoir
- Total capacity: 15127 thousand cubic meters
- Catchment area: 85.5 sq. km
- Surface area: 162 hectares

Aoyama Dam (Japanese: 青山ダム) is an earthfill dam located in Hokkaido Prefecture in Japan. The dam is used for irrigation. The catchment area of the dam is 85.5 km^{2}. The dam impounds about 162 ha of land when full and can store 15127 thousand cubic meters of water. The construction of the dam was started on 1951 and completed in 1962.
