= Tamiyasu Dam =

Dam in Hokkaido Prefecture, Japan

- Location within Japan
- Location: Hokkaido Prefecture, Japan
- Coordinates: 44°49′54″N 141°48′51″E
- Construction began: 1984
- Opening date: 2001

Dam and spillways
- Height: 24 m (79 ft)
- Length: 260.5 m (855 ft)

Reservoir
- Total capacity: 2,000,000 m^{3} (71,000,000 cu ft)
- Catchment area: 6.2 km^{2} (2.4 sq mi)
- Surface area: 39 hectares (96 acres)

Tamiyasu Dam (Japanese: 民安ダム) is an earthfill dam located in Hokkaido Prefecture in Japan. The dam is used for irrigation. The catchment area of the dam is 6.2 km^{2}. The dam impounds about 39 ha of land when full and can store 2000 thousand cubic meters of water. The construction of the dam was started on 1984 and completed in 2001.
