= Tobetsu Dam =

Dam in Hokkaidō Prefecture, Japan

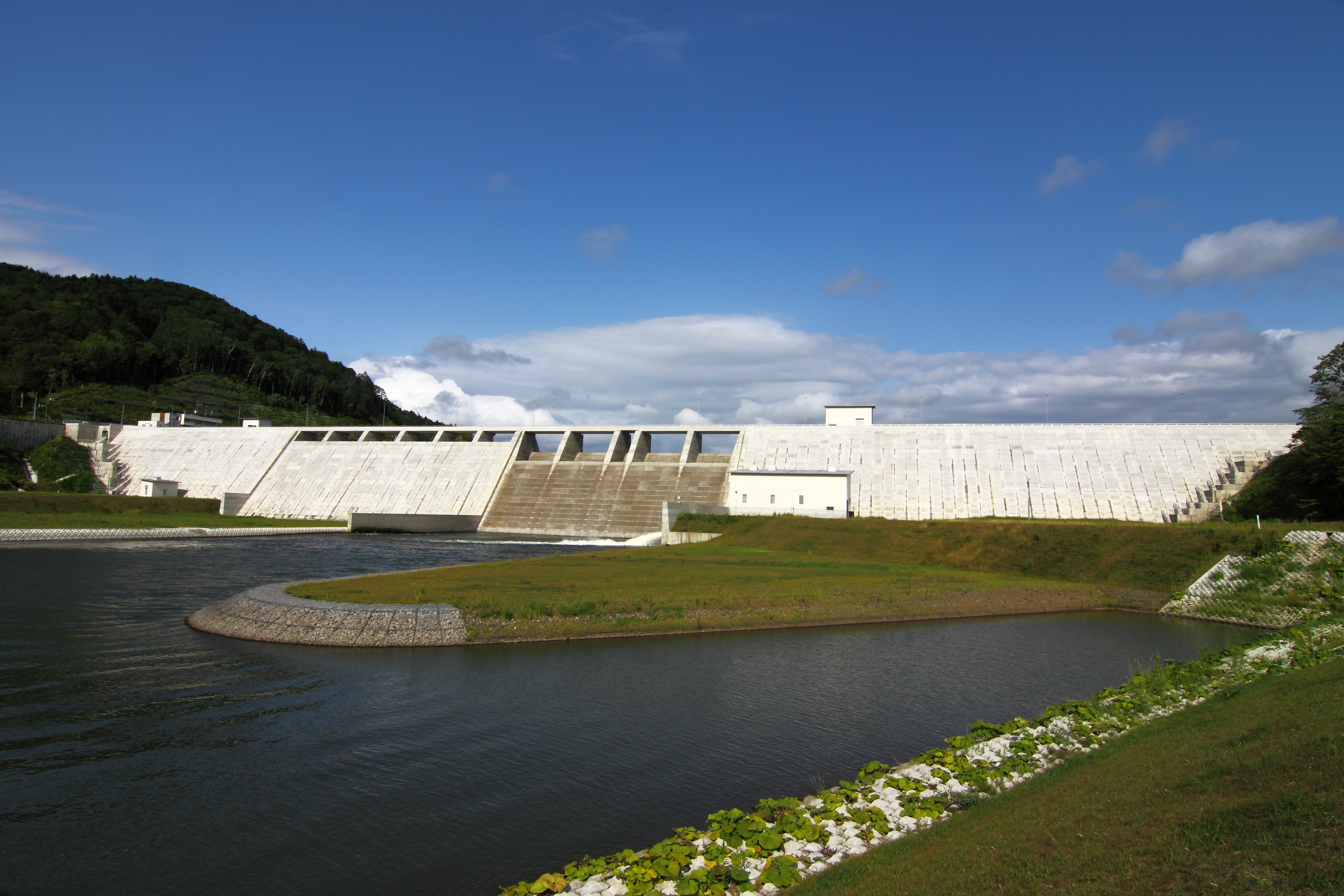
- Interactive map of Tobetsu Dam
- Location: Hokkaidō, Japan.
- Coordinates: 43°19′24″N 141°34′22″E
- Construction began: 1980
- Opening date: 2012

Dam and spillways
- Impounds: Tobetsu River
- Height: 52.7 m
- Length: 632 m

Reservoir
- Total capacity: 78,400,000 m^{3}
- Catchment area: 231.1 km^{2}
- Surface area: 670 hectares

Tobetsu Dam is a trapezoidal dam in Hokkaidō, Japan. It was started in 1980 and scheduled to open in 2012.
