= Hinode Dam =

Dam in Hokkaido Prefecture, Japan

- Location within Japan
- Interactive map of Hinode Dam
- Location: Hokkaido Prefecture, Japan
- Coordinates: 43°28′52″N 142°29′34″E
- Construction began: 1970
- Opening date: 1982

Dam and spillways
- Height: 26.8 m (88 ft)
- Length: 153 m (502 ft)

Reservoir
- Total capacity: 445 thousand cubic meters
- Catchment area: 3.6 sq. km
- Surface area: 13 hectares

Hinode Dam (Japanese: 日の出ダム) is an earthfill dam located in Hokkaido Prefecture in Japan. The dam is used for irrigation. The catchment area of the dam is 3.6 km^{2}. The dam impounds about 13 ha of land when full and can store 445 thousand cubic meters of water. The construction of the dam was started on 1970 and completed in 1982.
