= Morai Dam =

Dam in Hokkaido Prefecture, Japan

- Location within Japan
- Location: Hokkaido Prefecture, Japan
- Coordinates: 43°21′13″N 141°29′52″E
- Construction began: 1977
- Opening date: 1996

Dam and spillways
- Height: 29.6 m (97 ft)
- Length: 238.5 m (782 ft)

Reservoir
- Total capacity: 5600 thousand cubic meters
- Catchment area: 20.5 sq. km
- Surface area: 63 hectares

Morai Dam (Japanese: 望来ダム) is an earthfill dam located in Hokkaido Prefecture in Japan. The dam is used for irrigation. The catchment area of the dam is 20.5 km^{2}. The dam impounds about 63 ha of land when full and can store 5600 thousand cubic meters of water. The construction of the dam was started on 1977 and completed in 1996.
