= Tomura Dam =

Dam in Hokkaido Prefecture, Japan

- Location within Japan
- Location: Hokkaido Prefecture, Japan
- Coordinates: 43°25′59″N 142°53′02″E
- Construction began: 1975
- Opening date: 1978

Dam and spillways
- Height: 37 m (121 ft)
- Length: 106 m (348 ft)

Reservoir
- Total capacity: 2,900,000 m^{3} (100,000,000 cu ft)
- Catchment area: 329.9 km^{2} (127.4 sq mi)
- Surface area: 37 hectares (91 acres)

Tomura Dam (Japanese: 富村ダム) is a gravity dam located in Hokkaido Prefecture in Japan. The dam is used for power production. The catchment area of the dam is 329.9 km^{2}. The dam impounds about 37 ha of land when full and can store, 2900 thousand cubic meters of water. The construction of the dam was started in 1975 and completed in 1978.
