= Yoichi Dam =

Dam in Hokkaido Prefecture, Japan

- Location within Japan
- Location: Hokkaido Prefecture, Japan
- Coordinates: 43°9′17″N 140°41′01″E
- Construction began: 1971
- Opening date: 1987

Dam and spillways
- Height: 36.8 m (121 ft)
- Length: 220 m (720 ft)

Reservoir
- Total capacity: 800,000 m^{3} (28,000,000 cu ft)
- Catchment area: 9.6 km^{2} (3.7 sq mi)
- Surface area: 8 hectares (20 acres)

Yoichi Dam (Japanese: 余市ダム) is a rockfill dam located in Hokkaido Prefecture in Japan. The dam is used for irrigation. The catchment area of the dam is 9.6 km^{2}. The dam impounds about 8 ha of land when full and can store 800 thousand cubic meters of water. The construction of the dam was started on 1971 and completed in 1987.
