= Kuttari Dam =

Dam in Hokkaido Prefecture, Japan

- Location within Japan
- Location: Hokkaido Prefecture, Japan
- Coordinates: 43°8′55″N 142°54′28″E
- Construction began: 1983
- Opening date: 1988

Dam and spillways
- Height: 27.5 m (90 ft)
- Length: 220.1 m (722 ft)

Reservoir
- Total capacity: 3130 thousand cubic meters
- Catchment area: 940 sq. km
- Surface area: 49 hectares

Kuttari Dam (Japanese: 屈足ダム) is a rockfill dam located in Hokkaido Prefecture in Japan. The dam is used for irrigation and power production. The catchment area of the dam is 940 km^{2}. The dam impounds about 49 ha of land when full and can store 3130 thousand cubic meters of water. The construction of the dam was started on 1983 and completed in 1988.
