= Kuobetsu Dam =

Dam in Hokkaido Prefecture, Japan

- Location within Japan
- Location: Hokkaido Prefecture, Japan
- Coordinates: 42°53′34″N 141°56′17″E
- Opening date: 1925

Dam and spillways
- Height: 21.3 m (70 ft)
- Length: 124 m (407 ft)

Reservoir
- Total capacity: 795 thousand cubic meters
- Catchment area: 16.4 sq. km
- Surface area: 12 hectares

Kuobetsu Dam (Japanese: クオーベツダム) is an earthfill dam located in Hokkaido Prefecture in Japan. The dam is used for irrigation. The catchment area of the dam is 16.4 km^{2}. The dam impounds about 12 ha of land when full and can store 795 thousand cubic meters of water. The construction of the dam was completed in 1925.
