= Samuni Dam =

Dam in Hokkaido Prefecture, Japan

- Location within Japan
- Location: Hokkaido Prefecture, Japan
- Coordinates: 42°11′07″N 142°57′32″E
- Construction began: 1968
- Opening date: 1975

Dam and spillways
- Height: 44 m (144 ft)
- Length: 140 m (460 ft)

Reservoir
- Total capacity: 6,200,000 m^{3} (220,000,000 cu ft)
- Catchment area: 54.9 km^{2} (21.2 sq mi)
- Surface area: 44 hectares (110 acres)

Samuni Dam (Japanese: 様似ダム) is a gravity dam located in Hokkaido Prefecture in Japan. The dam is used for flood control. The catchment area of the dam is 54.9 km^{2}. The dam impounds about 44 ha of land when full and can store 6200 thousand cubic meters of water. The construction of the dam was started on 1968 and completed in 1975.
