= Apporo Dam =

Dam in Hokkaido Prefecture, Japan

- Location within Japan
- Interactive map of Apporo Dam
- Location: Hokkaido Prefecture, Japan
- Coordinates: 42°45′59″N 141°59′37″E
- Construction began: 1986
- Opening date: 2018

Dam and spillways
- Height: 47.2 m (155 ft)
- Length: 516 m (1,693 ft)

Reservoir
- Total capacity: 47400 thousand cubic meters
- Catchment area: 105.3 sq. km
- Surface area: 303 hectares

Apporo Dam (Japanese: 厚幌ダム) is a trapezoidal dam located in Hokkaido Prefecture in Japan. The dam is used for flood control, irrigation and water supply. The catchment area of the dam is 105.3 km^{2}. The dam impounds about 303 ha of land when full and can store 47400 thousand cubic meters of water. The construction of the dam was started on 1986 and completed in 2018.
