= Yubarisyuparo Dam =

Dam in Hokkaido Prefecture, Japan

Yubarisyuparo Dam (Re)
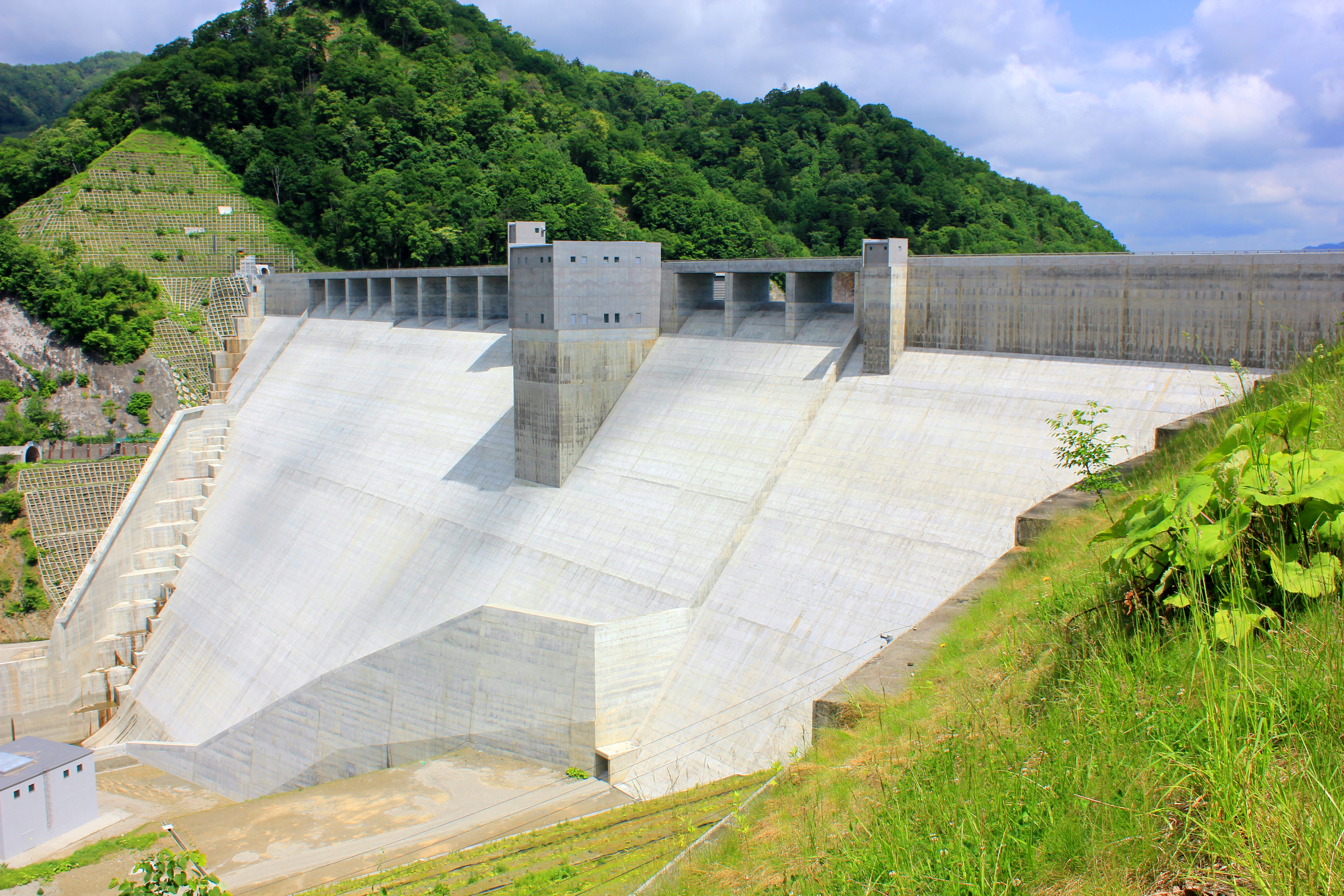

- Location within Japan
- Location: Hokkaido Prefecture, Japan
- Coordinates: 43°1′24″N 142°5′57″E
- Construction began: 1991
- Opening date: 2014

Dam and spillways
- Height: 110.6 m (363 ft)
- Length: 390 m (1,280 ft)

Reservoir
- Total capacity: 427,000,000 m^{3} (1.51×10^{10} cu ft)
- Catchment area: 433 km^{2} (167 sq mi)
- Surface area: 1,500 hectares (3,700 acres)

Yubarisyuparo Dam (Re) (Japanese: 夕張シューパロダム（再）) is a gravity dam located in Hokkaido Prefecture in Japan. The dam is used for flood control, irrigation, water supply and power production. The catchment area of the dam is 433 km^{2}. The dam impounds about 1500 ha of land when full and can store 427000 thousand cubic meters of water. The construction of the dam was started on 1991 and completed in 2014.
