= Asahimachi No.2 Dam =

Dam in Hokkaido Prefecture, Japan

- Location within Japan
- Interactive map of Asahimachi No.2 Dam
- Location: Hokkaido Prefecture, Japan
- Coordinates: 43°4′29″N 141°57′37″E
- Opening date: 1970

Dam and spillways
- Height: 19.6 m (64 ft)
- Length: 122 m (400 ft)

Reservoir
- Total capacity: 334 thousand cubic meters
- Catchment area: 6.5 sq. km
- Surface area: 7 hectares

Asahimachi No.2 Dam (Japanese: 旭町第二ダム) is a gravity dam located in Hokkaido Prefecture in Japan. The dam is used for water supply. The catchment area of the dam is 6.5 km^{2}. The dam impounds about 7 ha of land when full and can store 334 thousand cubic meters of water. The construction of the dam was completed in 1970.
