= Shizunai Dam =

Dam in Hokkaido Prefecture, Japan

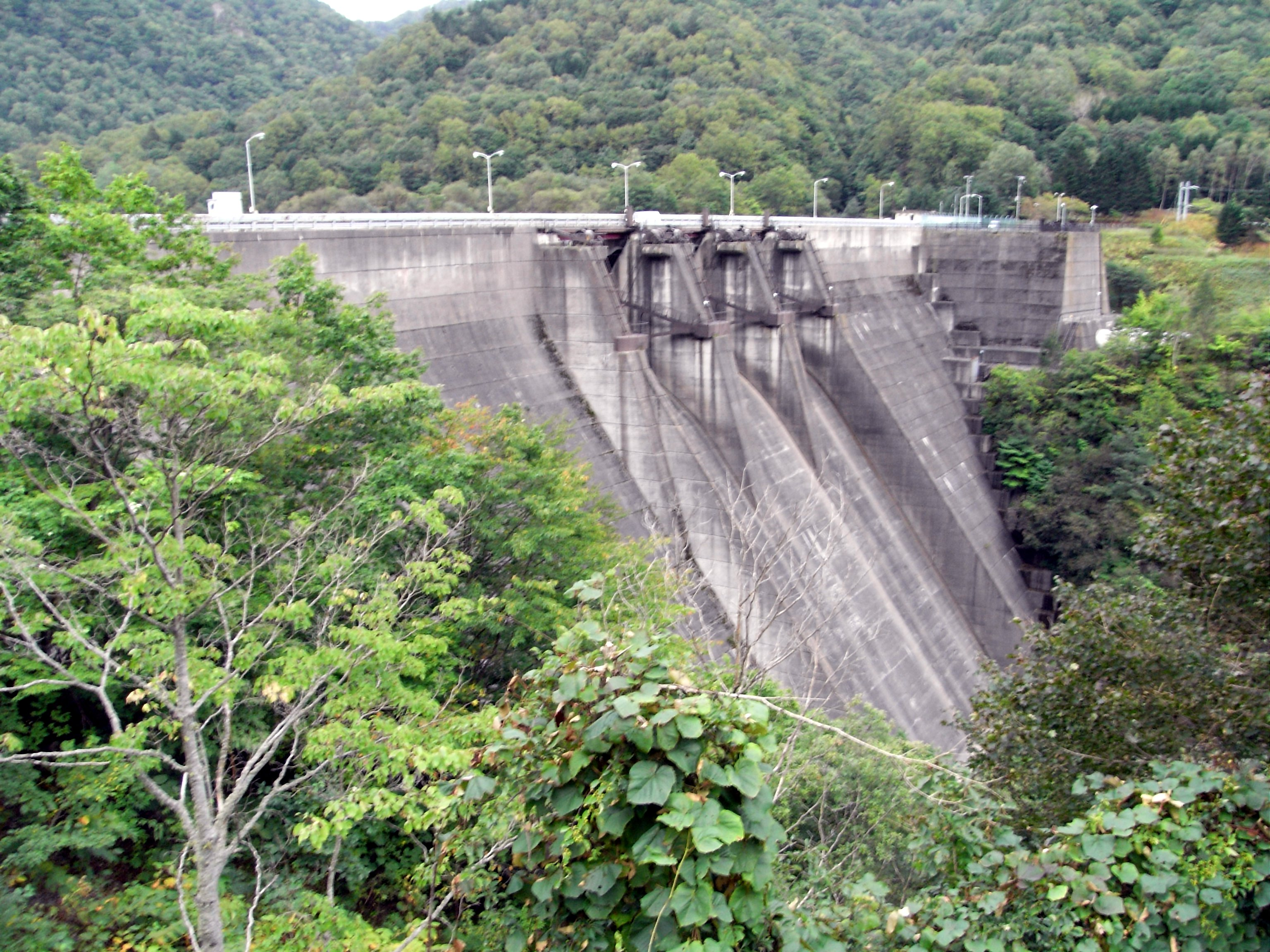

- Location within Japan
- Location: Hokkaido Prefecture, Japan
- Coordinates: 42°24′51″N 142°34′01″E
- Construction began: 1959
- Opening date: 1966

Dam and spillways
- Height: 66 m (217 ft)
- Length: 207.5 m (681 ft)

Reservoir
- Total capacity: 29,800,000 m^{3} (1.05×10^{9} cu ft)
- Catchment area: 863.8 km^{2} (333.5 sq mi)
- Surface area: 140 hectares (350 acres)

Shizunai Dam (Japanese: 静内ダム) is a gravity dam located in Hokkaido Prefecture in Japan. The dam is used for power production. The catchment area of the dam is 863.8 km^{2}. The dam impounds about 140 ha of land when full and can store 29800 thousand cubic meters of water. The construction of the dam was started on 1959 and completed in 1966.
