= Kamikogawa Dam =

Dam in Hokkaido Prefecture, Japan

- Location within Japan
- Interactive map of Kamikogawa Dam
- Location: Hokkaido Prefecture, Japan
- Coordinates: 44°15′17″N 141°50′45″E
- Construction began: 1974
- Opening date: 2003

Dam and spillways
- Height: 33.2 m (109 ft)
- Length: 187.3 m (615 ft)

Reservoir
- Total capacity: 3677 thousand cubic meters
- Catchment area: 29.8 sq. km
- Surface area: 45 hectares

Kamikogawa Dam (Japanese: 上小川ダム) is an earthfill dam located in Hokkaido Prefecture in Japan. The dam is used for flood control. The catchment area of the dam is 29.8 km^{2}. The dam impounds about 45 ha of land when full and can store 3677 thousand cubic meters of water. The construction of the dam was started on 1974 and completed in 2003.
