= Shimohorokanai Dam =

Dam in Hokkaido Prefecture, Japan

- Location within Japan
- Location: Hokkaido Prefecture, Japan
- Coordinates: 43°55′55″N 142°8′35″E
- Opening date: 1970

Dam and spillways
- Height: 20.7 m (68 ft)
- Length: 184 m (604 ft)

Reservoir
- Total capacity: 1,000,000 m^{3} (35,000,000 cu ft)
- Catchment area: 3.9 km^{2} (1.5 sq mi)
- Surface area: 32 hectares (79 acres)

Shimohorokanai Dam (Japanese: 下幌加内ダム) is an earthfill dam located in Hokkaido Prefecture in Japan. The dam is used for irrigation. The catchment area of the dam is 3.9 km^{2}. The dam impounds about 32 ha of land when full and can store 1000 thousand cubic meters of water. The construction of the dam was completed in 1970.
