= Sankei Dam =

Dam in Hokkaido Prefecture, Japan

- Location within Japan
- Location: Hokkaido Prefecture, Japan
- Coordinates: 44°11′04″N 141°46′58″E
- Opening date: 1960

Dam and spillways
- Height: 17 m (56 ft)
- Length: 77 m (253 ft)

Reservoir
- Total capacity: 688,000 m^{3} (24,300,000 cu ft)
- Catchment area: 7.5 km^{2} (2.9 sq mi)
- Surface area: 19 hectares (47 acres)

Sankei Dam (Japanese: 三渓ダム) is a gravity dam located in Hokkaido Prefecture in Japan. The dam is used for irrigation. The catchment area of the dam is 7.5 km^{2}. The dam impounds about 19 ha of land when full and can store 688 thousand cubic meters of water. The construction of the dam was completed in 1960.
