= Ichihosawa Dam =

Dam in Hokkaido Prefecture, Japan

- Location within Japan
- Interactive map of Ichihosawa Dam
- Location: Hokkaido Prefecture, Japan
- Coordinates: 43°7′37″N 141°49′52″E
- Construction began: 1924
- Opening date: 1927

Dam and spillways
- Height: 17.4 m (57 ft)
- Length: 86 m (282 ft)

Reservoir
- Total capacity: 168 thousand cubic meters
- Catchment area: 0.6 sq. km
- Surface area: 2 hectares

Ichihosawa Dam (Japanese: 一の沢ダム) is an earthfill dam located in Hokkaido Prefecture in Japan. The dam is used for irrigation. The catchment area of the dam is 0.6 km^{2}. The dam impounds about 2 ha of land when full and can store 168 thousand cubic meters of water. The construction of the dam was started on 1924 and completed in 1927.
