= Toyama Dam =

Dam in Hokkaido Prefecture, Japan

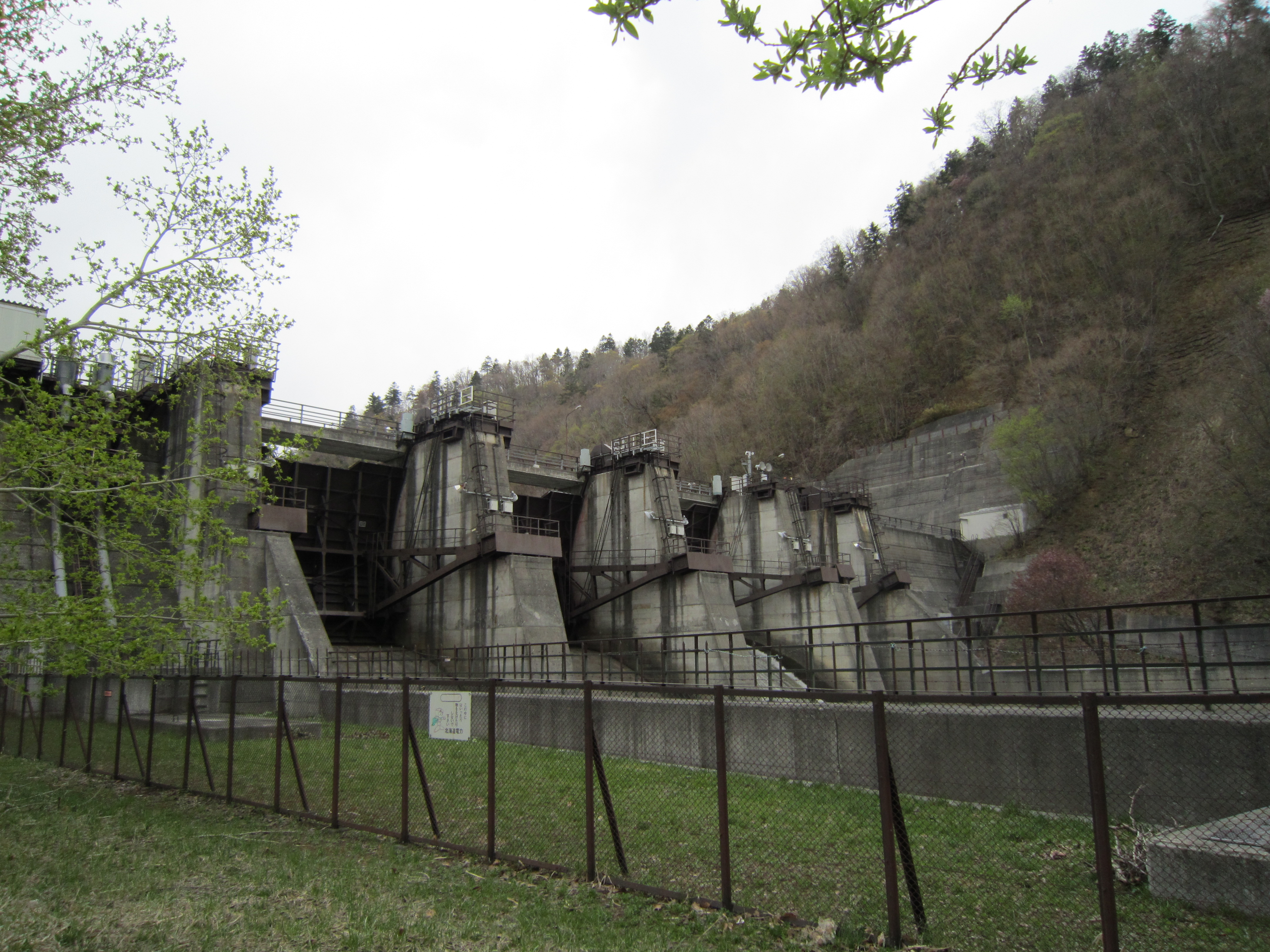

- Location within Japan
- Location: Hokkaido Prefecture, Japan
- Coordinates: 42°58′16″N 141°13′03″E
- Construction began: 1968
- Opening date: 1972

Dam and spillways
- Height: 30 m (98 ft)
- Length: 217 m (712 ft)

Reservoir
- Total capacity: 1,370,000 m^{3} (48,000,000 cu ft)
- Catchment area: 452.8 km^{2} (174.8 sq mi)
- Surface area: 13 hectares (32 acres)

Toyama Dam (Japanese: 砥山ダム) is a gravity dam located in Hokkaido Prefecture in Japan. The dam is used for power production. The catchment area of the dam is 452.8 km^{2}. The dam impounds about 13 ha of land when full and can store 1370 thousand cubic meters of water. The construction of the dam was started on 1968 and completed in 1972.
