= Shirogane Dam =

Dam in Hokkaido Prefecture, Japan

- Location within Japan
- Location: Hokkaido Prefecture, Japan
- Coordinates: 43°29′27″N 142°35′54″E
- Opening date: 2002

Dam and spillways
- Height: 63.5 m (208 ft)
- Length: 611 m (2,005 ft)

Reservoir
- Total capacity: 6,800,000 m^{3} (240,000,000 cu ft)
- Catchment area: 73 km^{2} (28 sq mi)
- Surface area: 46 hectares (110 acres)

Shirogane Dam (Japanese: しろがねダム) is a rockfill dam located in Hokkaido Prefecture in Japan. The dam is used for irrigation. The catchment area of the dam is 73 km^{2}. The dam impounds about 46 ha of land when full and can store 6800 thousand cubic meters of water. The construction of the dam was completed in 2002.
