= Fukuidanikawa Dam =

Dam in Hokkaido Prefecture, Japan

- Location within Japan
- Interactive map of Fukuidanikawa Dam
- Location: Hokkaido Prefecture, Japan
- Coordinates: 43°37′03″N 141°50′08″E
- Opening date: 1925

Dam and spillways
- Height: 20.2 m (66 ft)
- Length: 134 m (440 ft)

Reservoir
- Total capacity: 558 thousand cubic meters
- Catchment area: 4.8 sq. km
- Surface area: 6 hectares

Fukuidanikawa Dam (Japanese: 福井谷川ダム) is an earthfill dam located in Hokkaido Prefecture in Japan. The dam is used for irrigation. The catchment area of the dam is 4.8 km^{2}. The dam impounds about 6 ha of land when full and can store 558 thousand cubic meters of water. The construction of the dam was completed in 1925.
