= Higashinosawa Dam =

Dam in Hokkaido Prefecture, Japan

- Location within Japan
- Interactive map of Higashinosawa Dam
- Location: Hokkaido Prefecture, Japan
- Coordinates: 42°28′29″N 142°46′29″E
- Construction began: 1982
- Opening date: 1987

Dam and spillways
- Height: 70 m (230 ft)
- Length: 140 m (460 ft)

Reservoir
- Total capacity: 9560 thousand cubic meters
- Catchment area: 155.1 sq. km
- Surface area: 56 hectares

Higashinosawa Dam (Japanese: 東の沢ダム) is a gravity dam located in Hokkaido Prefecture in Japan. The dam is used for power production. The catchment area of the dam is 155.1 km^{2}. The dam impounds about 56 ha of land when full and can store 9560 thousand cubic meters of water. The construction of the dam was started on 1982 and completed in 1987.
