= Tarumappu Dam =

Dam in Hokkaido Prefecture, Japan

- Location within Japan
- Location: Hokkaido Prefecture, Japan
- Coordinates: 43°55′26″N 141°50′00″E
- Construction began: 1972
- Opening date: 2000

Dam and spillways
- Height: 24 m (79 ft)
- Length: 330 m (1,080 ft)

Reservoir
- Total capacity: 1,130,000 m^{3} (40,000,000 cu ft)
- Catchment area: 11.6 km^{2} (4.5 sq mi)
- Surface area: 20 hectares (49 acres)

Tarumappu Dam (Japanese: 樽真布ダム) is an earthfill dam located in Hokkaido Prefecture in Japan. The dam is used for flood control. The catchment area of the dam is 11.6 km^{2}. The dam impounds about 20 ha of land when full and can store 1130 thousand cubic meters of water. The construction of the dam was started on 1972 and completed in 2000.
