= Onnebetsu Dam =

Dam in Hokkaido Prefecture, Japan

- Location within Japan
- Location: Hokkaido Prefecture, Japan
- Coordinates: 44°5′35″N 142°13′16″E
- Opening date: 1985

Dam and spillways
- Height: 33.7 m (111 ft)
- Length: 178 m (584 ft)

Reservoir
- Total capacity: 9,312,000 m^{3} (328,900,000 cu ft)
- Catchment area: 40.1 km^{2} (15.5 sq mi)
- Surface area: 136 hectares (340 acres)

Onnebetsu Dam (Japanese: 温根別ダム) is a rockfill dam located in Hokkaido Prefecture in Japan. The dam is used for irrigation. The catchment area of the dam is 40.1 km^{2}. The dam impounds about 136 ha of land when full and can store 9312 thousand cubic meters of water. The construction of the dam was completed in 1985.
