= Kinausu Dam =

Dam in Hokkaido Prefecture, Japan

- Location within Japan
- Location: Hokkaido Prefecture, Japan
- Coordinates: 43°3′17″N 141°51′57″E
- Construction began: 1989
- Opening date: 2009

Dam and spillways
- Height: 27.2 m (89 ft)
- Length: 177 m (581 ft)

Reservoir
- Total capacity: 514 thousand cubic meters
- Catchment area: 1.7 sq. km
- Surface area: 8 hectares

Kinausu Dam (Japanese: 杵臼ダム) is an earthfill dam located in Hokkaido Prefecture in Japan. The dam is used for flood control and irrigation. The catchment area of the dam is 1.7 km^{2}. The dam impounds about 8 ha of land when full and can store 514 thousand cubic meters of water. The construction of the dam was started on 1989 and completed in 2009.
