= Makubetsu Dam =

Dam in Hokkaido Prefecture, Japan

- Location within Japan
- Location: Hokkaido Prefecture, Japan
- Coordinates: 42°52′25″N 143°16′41″E
- Construction began: 1978
- Opening date: 2004

Dam and spillways
- Height: 26.9 m (88 ft)
- Length: 335 m (1,099 ft)

Reservoir
- Total capacity: 2300 thousand cubic meters
- Catchment area: 9.1 sq. km
- Surface area: 29 hectares

Makubetsu Dam (Japanese: 幕別ダム) is an earthfill dam located in Hokkaido Prefecture in Japan. The dam is used for irrigation. The catchment area of the dam is 9.1 km^{2}. The dam impounds about 29 ha of land when full and can store 2300 thousand cubic meters of water. The construction of the dam was started on 1978 and completed in 2004.
