= Ponteshio Dam =

Dam in Hokkaido Prefecture, Japan

- Location within Japan
- Location: Hokkaido Prefecture, Japan
- Coordinates: 43°58′43″N 142°45′12″E
- Construction began: 1979
- Opening date: 1983

Dam and spillways
- Height: 22.3 m (73 ft)
- Length: 126.2 m (414 ft)

Reservoir
- Total capacity: 996,000 m^{3} (35,200,000 cu ft)
- Catchment area: 93.8 km^{2} (36.2 sq mi)
- Surface area: 19 hectares (47 acres)

Ponteshio Dam (Japanese: ポンテシオダム) is a gravity dam located in Hokkaido Prefecture in Japan. The dam is used for power production. The catchment area of the dam is 93.8 km^{2}. The dam impounds about 19 ha of land when full and can store 996 thousand cubic meters of water. The construction of the dam was started on 1979 and completed in 1983.
