= Kaminokuni Dam =

Dam in Hokkaido Prefecture, Japan

- Location within Japan
- Interactive map of Kaminokuni Dam
- Location: Hokkaido Prefecture, Japan
- Coordinates: 41°48′10″N 140°11′04″E
- Construction began: 1985
- Opening date: 2002

Dam and spillways
- Height: 51.3 m (168 ft)
- Length: 247.9 m (813 ft)

Reservoir
- Total capacity: 3730 thousand cubic meters
- Catchment area: 17.5 sq. km
- Surface area: 22 hectares

Kaminokuni Dam (Japanese: 上ノ国ダム) is a gravity dam located in Hokkaido Prefecture in Japan. The dam is used for flood control, irrigation and water supply. The catchment area of the dam is 17.5 km^{2}. The dam impounds about 22 ha of land when full and can store 3730 thousand cubic meters of water. The construction of the dam was started on 1985 and completed in 2002.
