= Chiyodani Dam =

Dam in Hokkaido Prefecture, Japan

- Location within Japan
- Interactive map of Chiyodani Dam
- Location: Hokkaido Prefecture, Japan
- Coordinates: 43°8′16″N 141°50′36″E
- Opening date: 1923

Dam and spillways
- Height: 17.9 m (59 ft)
- Length: 165 m (541 ft)

Reservoir
- Total capacity: 620 thousand cubic meters
- Catchment area: 1.7 sq. km
- Surface area: 8 hectares

Chiyodani Dam (Japanese: 千代谷ダム) is an earthfill dam located in Hokkaido Prefecture in Japan. The dam is used for irrigation. The catchment area of the dam is 1.7 km^{2}. The dam impounds about 8 ha of land when full and can store 620 thousand cubic meters of water. The construction of the dam was completed in 1923.
