= Niikappu River =

River in Hokkaidō, Japan

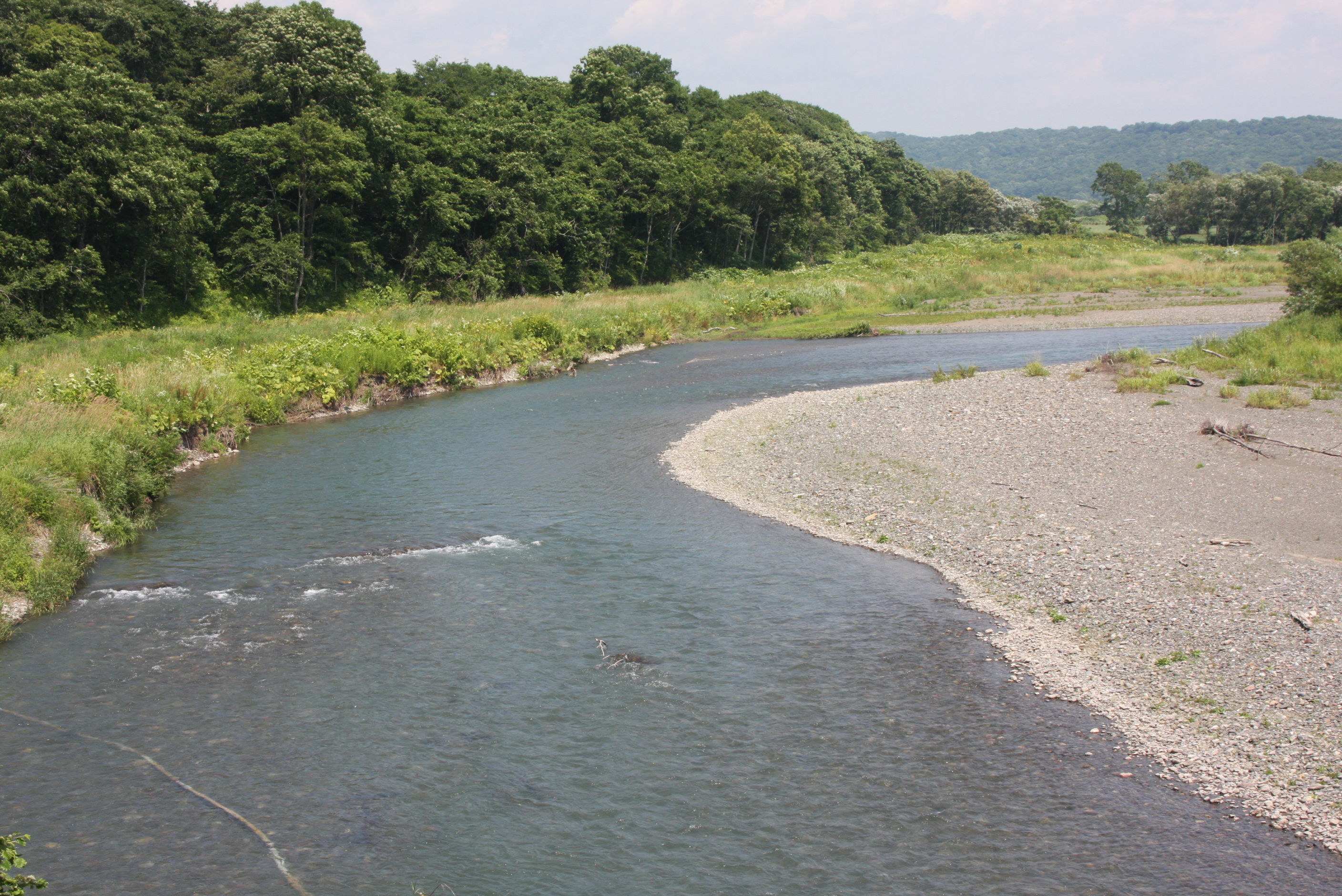

- Location within Japan
- Native name: 新冠川 (Japanese); Nikappu-gawa (Japanese)

Location
- Country: Japan
- State: Hokkaidō
- Region: Hidaka
- District: Niikappu
- Municipality: Niikappu

Physical characteristics
- Source: Mount Poroshiri
  - location: Niikappu, Hokkaidō, Japan
  - coordinates: 42°43′9″N 142°40′58″E
  - elevation: 2,052.4 m (6,734 ft)
- Mouth: Pacific Ocean
  - location: Niikappu, Hokkaidō, Japan
  - coordinates: 42°21′42″N 142°18′17″E
  - elevation: 0 m (0 ft)
- Length: 80 km (50 mi)

Niikappu River (新冠川, Niikappu-gawa) is a river in Hokkaidō, Japan.

== Course ==
The Niikappu River flows south to southwest from Mount Poroshiri in the Hidaka Mountains. The river flows through four dams, including Niikappu Dam and Okuniikappu Dam. Both dams are owned by the Hokkaido Electric Power Company, Inc. The dams form Lake Niikappu and Lake Poroshiri, respectively. After 80 kilometres (50 mi), the river empties into the Pacific Ocean.
