= Hokkaido Electric Power Company =

Japanese electric utility company

Hokkaido Electric Power Co., Inc.

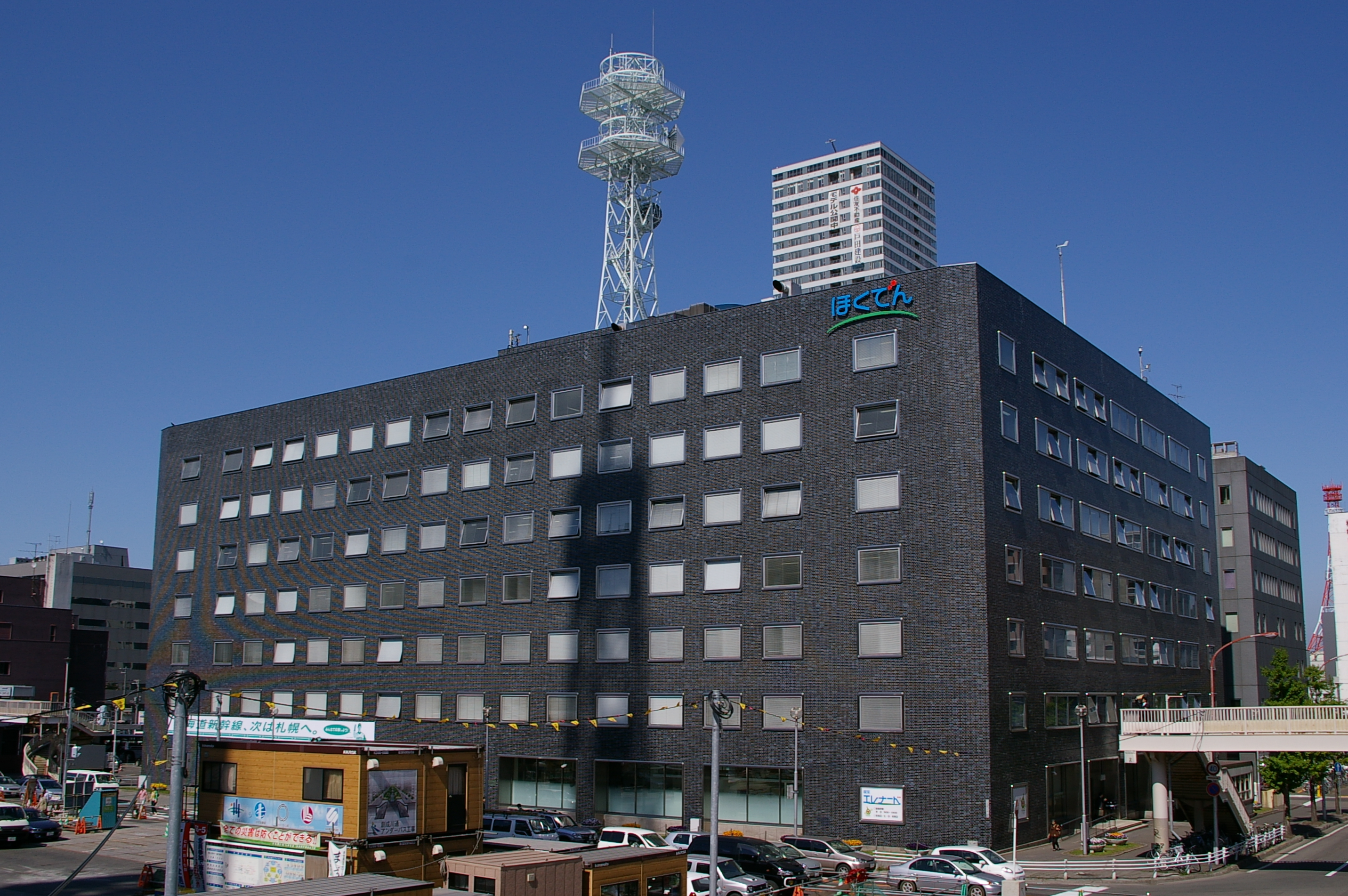
- Headquarters in Sapporo (note the Hokuden (ほくでん) logo in the upper right)
- Native name: 北海道電力株式会社
- Romanized name: Hokkaidō Denryoku Kabushiki-gaisha
- Company type: Public KK
- Traded as: TYO: 9509
- Industry: Electricity generation and transmission
- Founded: May 1, 1951; 75 years ago
- Headquarters: 2, Higashi 1-chome, Odori, Chūō-ku, Sapporo, Ishikari Subprefecture, Hokkaido, Japan
- Number of locations: 56 Hydroelectric; 12 Thermal; 1 Nuclear; 1 Geothermal; 1 Photovoltaic; 373 Substations; (FY2017)
- Area served: Hokkaido
- Key people: Yoshitaka Sato (Chairman); Akihiko Mayum (President & CEO)
- Production output: Generated electrical power: ▼27,734 (GW⋅h) (2018); ▼29,808 (GW⋅h) (2017); ▼31,900 (GW⋅h) (2016)
- Revenue: ▲JPN¥733,050 million (2018); ▼¥702,776 million (2017); ▲¥724,111 million (2016)
- Operating income: ▲¥33,726 million (2018); ▼¥27,443 million (2017); ▲¥43,100 million (2016)
- Net income: ¥(64,207) million (Consolidated, loss) (FY2014)
- Total assets: ▲¥1,915,908 million (2018); ▲¥1,829,539 million (2017); ▲¥1,826,141 million (2016)
- Number of employees: ▼10,962 (FY2018); 10,985 (FY2017); ▼10,985 (FY2016)
- Website: www.hepco.co.jp/english/index.html

The Hokkaido Electric Power Co., Inc. (Japanese: 北海道電力株式会社, Hokkaidō Denryoku Kabushiki-gaisha), or Hokuden (ほくでん) for short, is the monopoly electric company of Hokkaidō, Japan. It is also known as Dōden and HEPCO. The company is traded on the Tokyo Stock Exchange and the Sapporo Securities Exchange.

According to the company profile, during fiscal 2011 (i.e. 1 April 2010 to 31 March 2011), 26% of the electricity generated was from nuclear, 31% from coal, 15% from hydro, 8% from oil and 2% from 'new energy' sources.

Hokkaido only has one nuclear power station, the Tomari Nuclear Power Plant.

== Facilities ==
- Nuclear
  - Tomari (ja:泊発電所) (2,070 MW)
- Coal
  - Tomato-atsuma Thermal Power Station (ja:苫東厚真発電所) (1,650 MW)
  - Naie (奈井江発電所) (350 MW)
  - Sunagawa (砂川発電所) (250 MW)
- Geothermal energy
  - Mori (ja:森発電所) (2.5 MW)
- Hydro electric – 53 dams including the following:
  - Kyogoku pumped storage project (600 MW)
  - Hoheikyo, Ishikari River (50 MW)
  - Kamiiwamatsu, Tokachi River (30.4 MW)
  - Niikappu, Niikappu River (200 MW)
  - Nokanan, Ishikari River (30 MW)
  - Okuniikappu, Niikappu River (44 MW)
  - Shizunai, Shizunai River (48 MW)
  - Takami, Shizunai River (200 MW)
  - Takisato, Ishikari River (57 MW)
  - Tokachi, Tokachi River (40 MW)
  - Tomura, Tokachi River (40 MW)
  - Uryu, Ishikari River (51 MW)
- Oil
  - Date (伊達発電所) (700 MW)
  - Shiriuchi (知内発電所) (700 MW)
  - Tomakomai (苫小牧発電所) (250 MW)
- Diesel
  - Onbetsu (音別発電所) (280 MW)

Others;

- Wind farms – 3 facilities (1.58 MW)
- Solar (photovoltaic) energy – 9 facilities (146 kW)

== Generating capacity by source ==
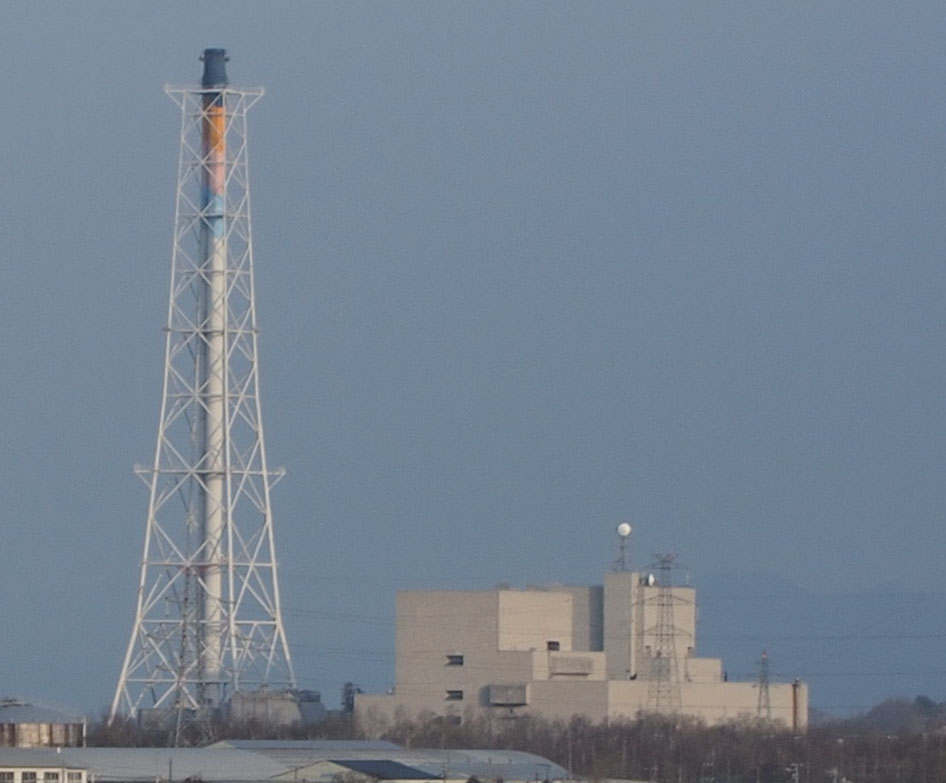
Date fuel oil-powered power station

Electricity producing capacity by source
Source	Megawatts	Percentage	Number of units
Coal	2,250	30	3
Nuclear	2,070	27.5	3
Oil	1,650	22	3
Hydro	1,231	16	53
Diesel	280	4	1
Geo-thermal	50	0.5	1
Other	2	-	
Total	7,533	100	62?
