= Aoki Corporation =

Defunct Japanese construction company

- Industry: Construction, lodging
- Founded: 1947; 78 years ago in Osaka, Japan
- Defunct: 2004; 21 years ago
- Fate: Merged with Asunaro Construction
- Successor: Asunaro Aoki Construction
- Headquarters: Tokyo, Japan
- Number of employees: 6,500 (2001)
- Website: aoki.co.jp (defunct)

Aoki Corporation was a Japanese construction company founded in 1947. It built many projects in Japan, Hong Kong, and Taiwan, and also invested in non-construction businesses, like hotels. It previously owned the Westin Hotels chain. The company, considered one of Japan's mid-tier zenekon (general contractors) by the 1990s, went bankrupt in 2001 and merged with Asunaro Construction in 2004.

== History ==
=== Establishment ===
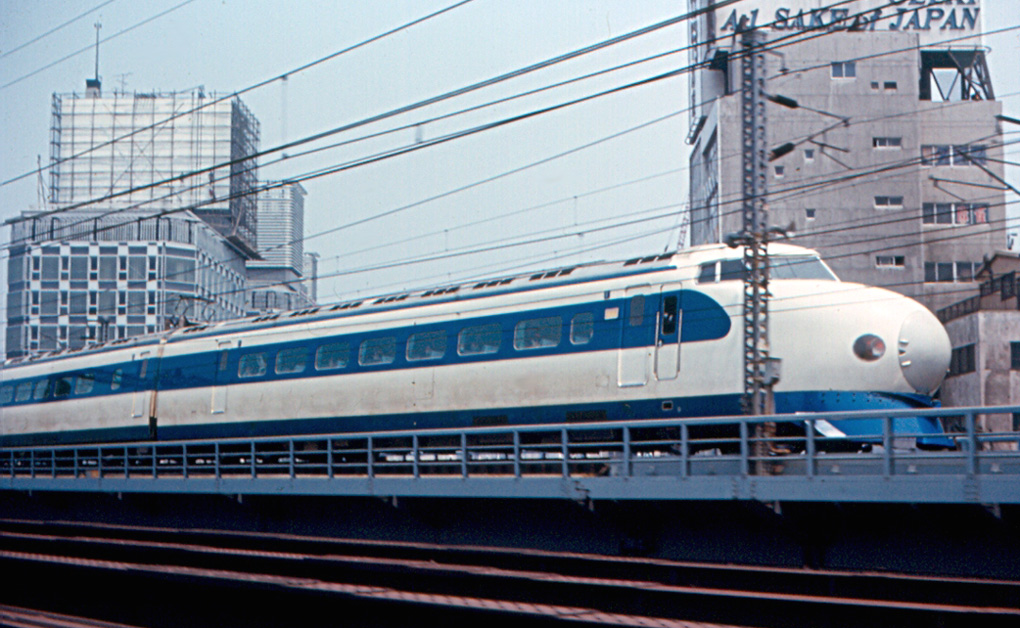
A train on the Tōkaidō Shinkansen, Japan's first high-speed rail line

The company was established as the Bulldozer Koji Co. Ltd. in Osaka in 1947 by Masuji Aoki, a former Imperial Japanese Navy commander. It opened a Tokyo branch office in 1948. In 1969, the company was renamed Aoki Corporation.

The firm was a "newcomer" to the Japanese construction industry, and found it more difficult to win projects than the larger, traditional firms did. As a result, Aoki diversified into the hotels business, partly to generate construction business for itself. In 1976 it bought the Caesar Park Hotel in Brazil and expanded the brand into a multi-national chain of nine locations. It also developed golf courses in South America.

=== International growth ===
A Hong Kong branch office was established in 1976 after Aoki won a tunneling contract for the new Mass Transit Railway (MTR). An American subsidiary, Aoki America Corporation, was founded in December 1980 in Columbia, Maryland. By 1983, Hong Kong was Aoki's largest overseas office with more than 400 staff.

During the 1980s economic bubble in Japan, Aoki Corporation invested heavily in non-construction businesses. It bought and developed more overseas hotels. Aoki acquired the American hospitality company Westin Hotels from Allegis Corporation in 1988, paying US$1.35 billion. Immediately following the acquisition they sold the Plaza Hotel in New York City to Donald Trump for about US$390 million.

Aoki Corporation was part the Offshore Reclamation Construction Association, a consortium of eight companies that supplied sand for construction of the Kansai International Airport's artificial island. In 1989, Japan's Fair Trade Commission alleged that the group was an illegal price-fixing cartel and ordered it to disband. Six of the involved firms, including Aoki, were ordered to pay surcharges, and all eight firms were suspended from bidding on Osaka Prefecture public works projects.

In 1989, the company established a subsidiary called Aoki Urban Development. The subsidiary opened the Westin Osaka hotel in 1993.

=== 1990s events ===
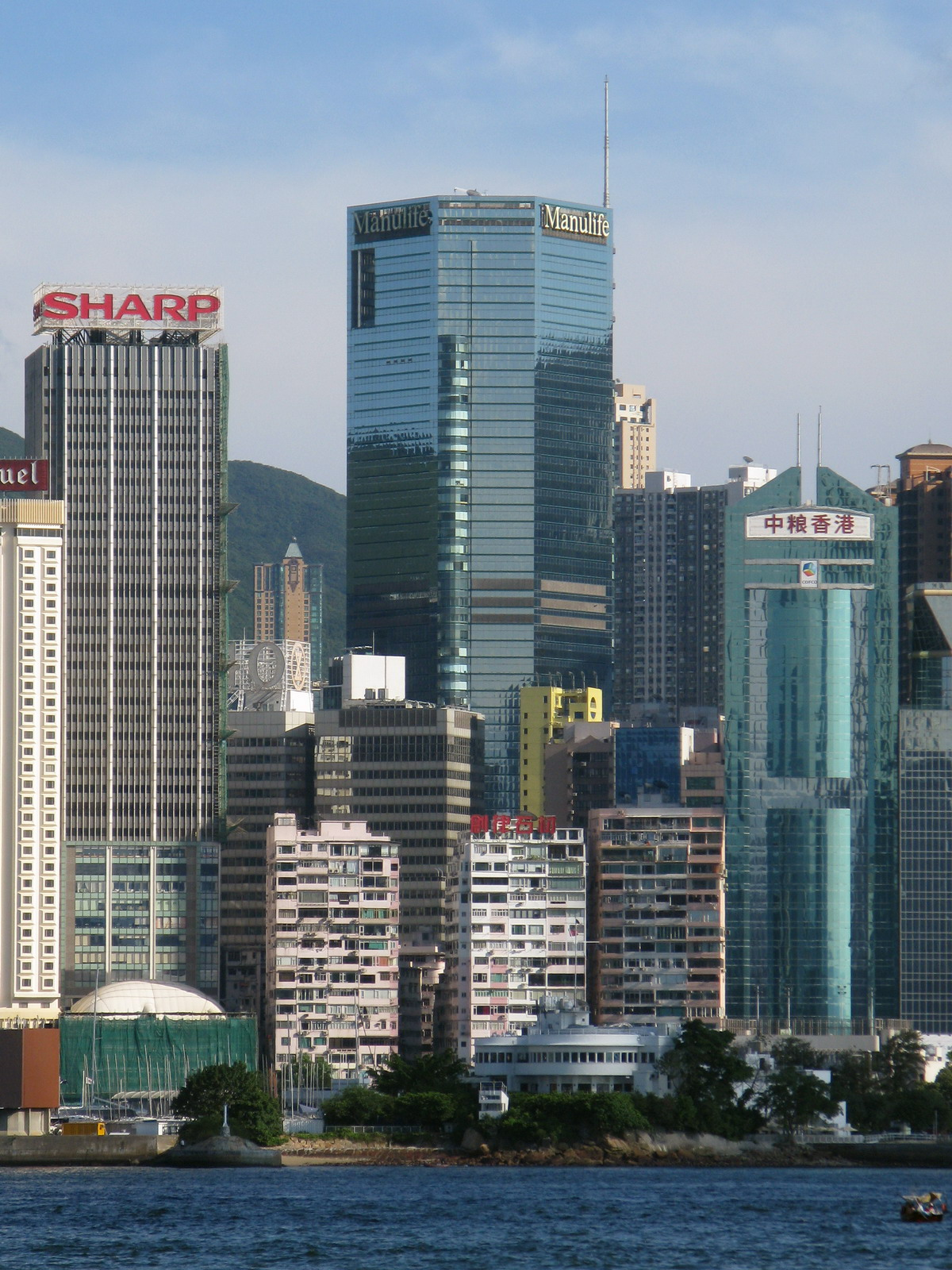
Manulife Plaza in Causeway Bay, Hong Kong, completed 1997

By 1990, Aoki ranked around 20th in size among Japanese construction companies. In 1993, the company had sales of ¥347 billion and a workforce of 3,455. Relative to other Japanese contractors, it realised a large proportion of sales in overseas markets such as Hong Kong – about one-third that year.

Aoki Corporation was the main contractor for the Towngas corporate headquarters in Quarry Bay, Hong Kong, where Hong Kong's second-deadliest construction accident occurred on 2 June 1993. A lift carrying 12 workers plunged 17 storeys, landing on the podium roof and killing all inside. A subsequent investigation by the Electrical and Mechanical Services Department revealed that a driving pinion in the motor gearbox assembly was in poor condition. The emergency brake failed to stop the lift's fall. Aoki Corporation was fined in 1994 over the tragedy, and paid compensation to the families of the victims. Following this disaster, the company was heavily criticised in Hong Kong for substandard safety practices.

In February 1996, Aoki Corporation won a number of safety awards in a competition arranged by the New Airport Projects Co-ordination Office of the Hong Kong Government in relation to Airport Core Programme construction work. The company won a gold award for safety management as well as awards for the best safety record for both general contracts and main contracts.

=== Bankruptcy and merger ===
The company's 1980s international expansion was financed by bank debt, and the company ran into financial challenges in the 1990s due to low income. It sold Westin Hotels in November 1994 for US$561 million but maintained ownership of many hotels. By the late 1990s, major Japanese banks considered Aoki Corporation to be at risk of failure, as it faced a heavy debt burden as well as fewer public works projects to bid on. In December 2001 the company filed for protection from creditors, effectively declaring bankruptcy. At the time it had approximately 6,500 employees, 4,560 of whom worked in the company's hospitality business.

In 2004, Aoki Corporation merged with Asunaro Construction to form a new company called Asunaro Aoki Construction.

== Notable projects ==
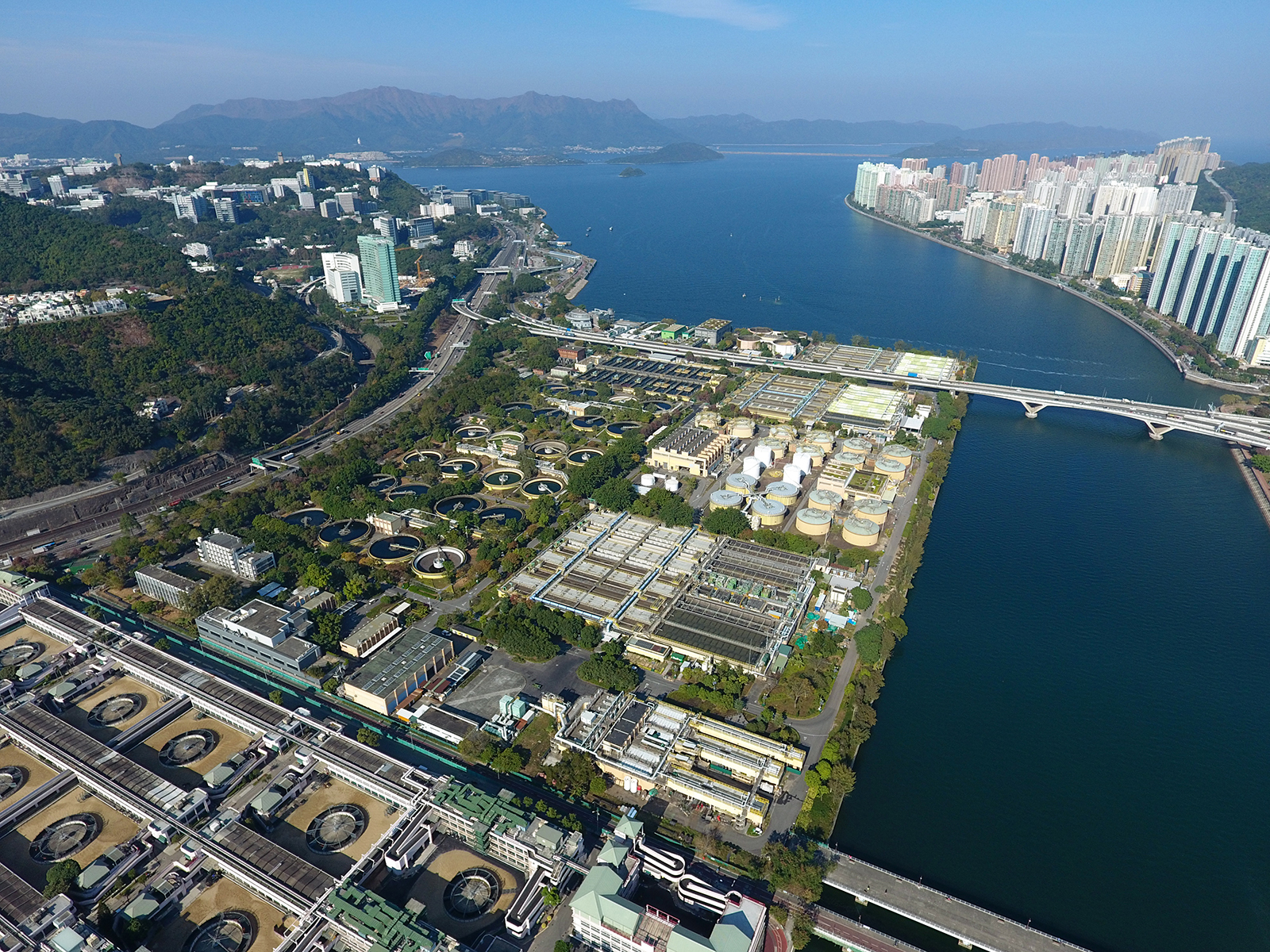
Aerial view of Shatin Sewage Treatment Works in the New Territories, Hong Kong

- Tōkaidō Shinkansen (Ayase Section), Japan (1964)
- Shimokotori Dam, Gifu Prefecture, Japan (1973)
- Seto Dam, Nara Prefecture, Japan (1978)
- Tedorigawa Dam, Ishikawa Prefecture, Japan (1979) – with Maeda Corporation
- Kornhill Gardens site formation, Hong Kong (1980s)
- Beacon Hill Tunnel, Hong Kong (1981)
- Tai Wo Hau station, Tsuen Wan, Hong Kong (1982)
- Sha Tin Sewage Treatment Works (Stage I), New Territories, Hong Kong (1982)
- Takami Dam, Hokkaido, Japan (1983) – with Kajima and Chizaki Kogyo Construction
- Heng Fa Chuen station, Chai Wan, Hong Kong (1985)
- Tuen Mun Hospital, Tuen Mun, Hong Kong (1990)
- Shichikashuku Dam, Shichikashuku, Miyagi, Japan (1990) – with Sato and Fujita
- Agigawa Dam, Ena, Gifu, Japan – with Obayashi Corporation and Dai Nippon Construction (1990)
- North Lantau Highway (Yam O Section), Lantau, Hong Kong (1997)
- Manulife Plaza, Causeway Bay, Hong Kong (1997)
- West Kowloon Highway (South Section), Kowloon, Hong Kong (1997)
- Hong Kong station, Central, Hong Kong (1998)
- Tung Chung station, Tung Chung, Hong Kong (1998)
