= Takami Dam =

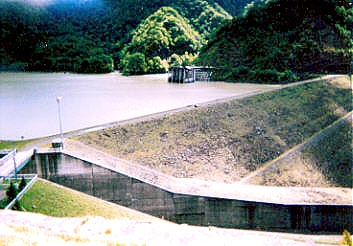
- Location: Hokkaidō, Japan
- Coordinates: 42°27′28″N 142°38′17″E
- Opening date: 1983

Dam and spillways
- Impounds: Shizunai River
- Height: 120 metres
- Length: 435 metres

Reservoir
- Creates: Takami Lake

Takami Dam is a dam in Hokkaidō, Japan. It has an electrical generation output of 200MW.

== History ==
The dam was constructed to control flooding of the Shizunai River and also to generate electricity. It was constructed by Kajima, Aoki Corporation, and Chizaki Kogyo Construction. It was completed in 1983. Power generation commenced in July 1983. A second power generation unit was completed in April 1993.

== Characteristics ==
The dam is approximately 120 metres high and 435 metres long.

The electrical generation output is 200MW. Power is supplied to the Hokkaido Electric Power Company.
