= Kyogoku pumped storage project =

- Country: Japan
- Location: Hokkaido
- Purpose: Power
- Status: Operational
- Opening date: 2014
- Owner: Hokkaido Electric Power Company

Dam and spillways
- Type of dam: Gravity
- Impounds: Pepenai river

Kyogoku pumped storage project
- Commission date: 2014
- Type: Pumped-storage
- Hydraulic head: 400 m (1,300 ft)
- Turbines: 3 x 200 MW Francis-type
- Installed capacity: 600 MW

Kyogoku pumped storage project is a hydro-electric project located in Hokkaido prefecture in Japan. The power plant is owned and run by Hokkaido Electric Power Company. The construction was completed in 2014. The power station has an installed capacity of 600 MW (200 MW x 3 units). The gross head is about 400m. The water is stored in a regulating pool on a hill in northern Kyogoku Town in the watershed of Pepenai river.

Kyogoku Dam (Japanese: 京極ダム) has a catchment area of 51.3 km^{2}. It impounds about 39 ha of land when full and can store 5541 thousand cubic meters of water. The construction of the dam was started on 1999 and completed in 2014.
