= Shimokotori Dam =

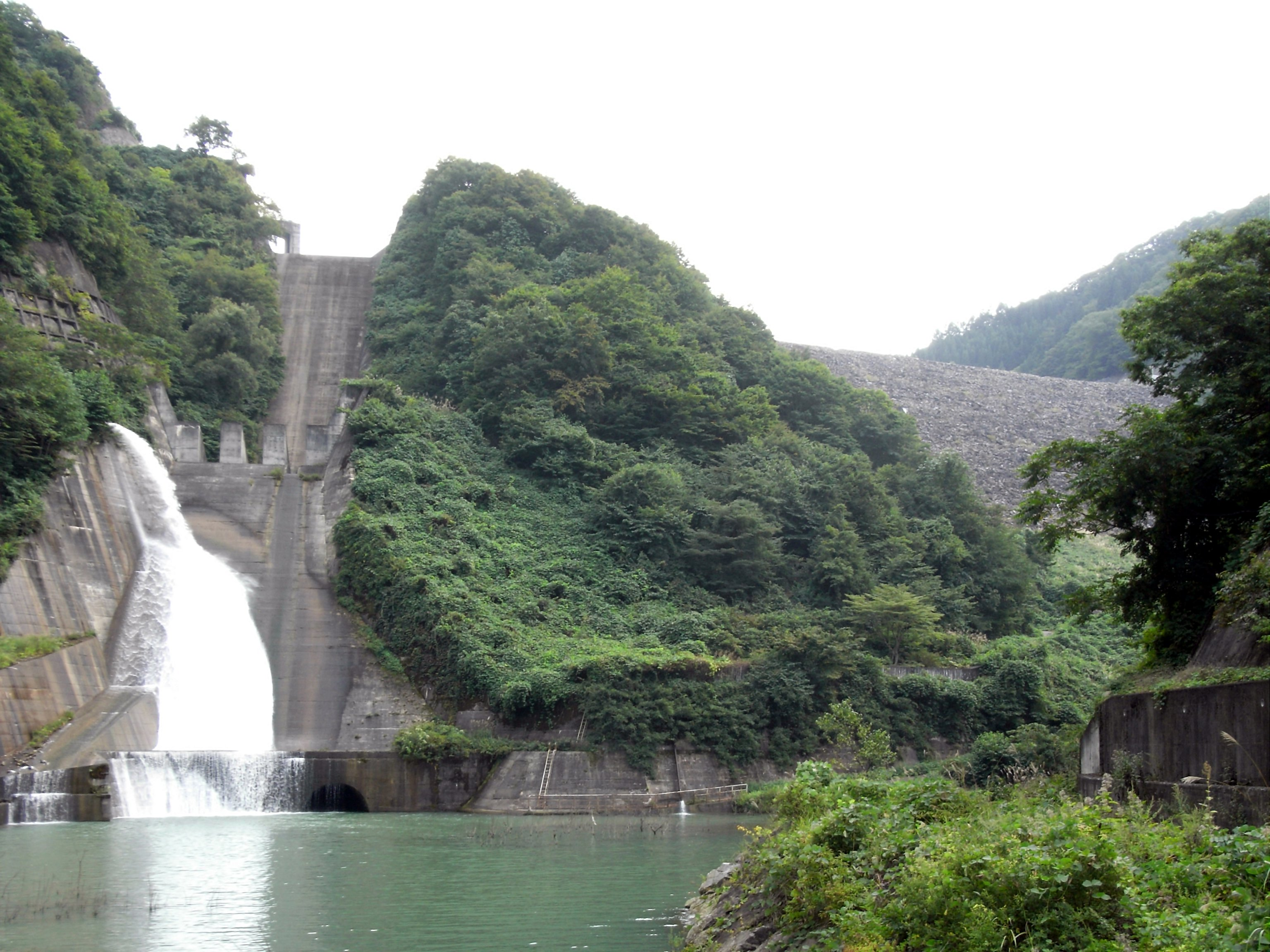
- View from the base of the dam

- Location within Japan
- Country: Japan
- Location: Hida, Gifu
- Coordinates: 36°14′54.32″N 137°01′31.61″E
- Purpose: Power
- Status: Operational
- Construction began: 1970
- Opening date: 1973; 53 years ago
- Owner: Kansai Electric Power Company

Dam and spillways
- Type of dam: Embankment, rock-fill
- Impounds: Shimokotori River
- Height: 119 m (390 ft)
- Length: 289.2 m (949 ft)
- Dam volume: 3,530,000 m^{3} (4,620,000 cu yd)

Reservoir
- Total capacity: 123,037,000 m^{3} (99,748 acre⋅ft)
- Active capacity: 94,958,000 m^{3} (76,984 acre⋅ft)
- Catchment area: 185.7 km^{2} (71.7 mi^{2})
- Surface area: 289 ha (710 acres)

Shimokotori Power Station
- Coordinates: 36°17′58.37″N 137°06′03.84″E
- Commission date: May 1973
- Hydraulic head: 251.1 m (824 ft)
- Turbines: 1 x 142 MW Francis-type
- Installed capacity: 142 MW

The Shimokotori Dam is a rock-fill dam on the Shimokotori River about 15 km (9.3 mi) west of Hida in Gifu Prefecture, Japan. The primary purpose of the dam is hydroelectric power generation and water from its reservoir is diverted via a 8.5 km (5.3 mi) long headrace tunnel to a 142 MW power station northeast of the dam. The power station discharges the water into the Jinzū River. Construction on the dam began in 1970 and it was completed in 1973. The power station went operational in May 1973 and is owned by Kansai Electric Power Company.

The dam was constructed by Aoki Corporation.
