= Beacon Hill Tunnel (Hong Kong) =

Hong Kong railway tunnel

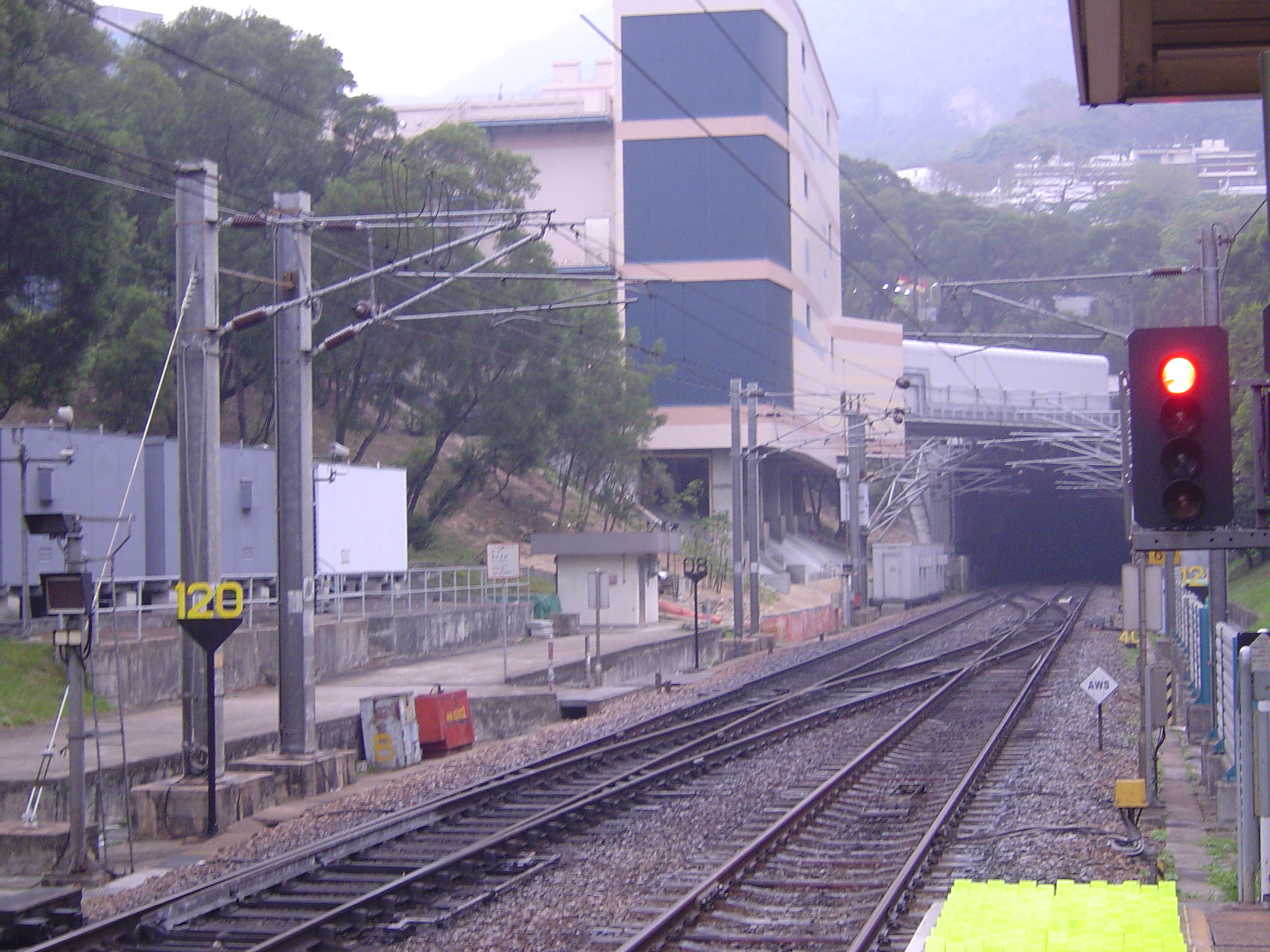
- South portal of the new Beacon Hill tunnel, as viewed from Kowloon Tong station
- Interactive map of Beacon Hill Tunnel

Overview
- Line: East Rail line
- Coordinates: 22.3395°N 114.1743°E
- Status: Active
- System: MTR
- Start: Kowloon Tong
- End: Tai Wai

Operation
- Work began: 1978; 48 years ago
- Opened: 26 April 1981; 45 years ago
- Traffic: Train

Technical
- Length: 2.3 km (1.4 mi)
- No. of tracks: Double
- Track gauge: 1,435 mm (4 ft 8 1/2 in)
- Electrified: 25 kV 50 Hz AC
- Tunnel clearance: 9.0 m (29.5 ft)
- Width: 11.1 m (36 ft)

Beacon Hill Tunnel is a railway tunnel in Hong Kong on the original Kowloon–Canton Railway, linking Kowloon Tong to its immediate south and Sha Tin to its north. The nearest stations to the south and north of the tunnel are Kowloon Tong and Tai Wai respectively. Today, the tunnel carries the MTR East Rail line metro service and through trains to mainland China. However, Guangzhou-Kowloon through trains were disused in 2024 and only carries MTR passenger trains towards Sheung Shui or Admiralty.

There are actually two tunnels of this name. The first (Chinese: 煙墩山隧道) opened in 1910 and operated until its replacement (Chinese: 筆架山隧道) came into operation following its 1981 completion. In 2020, After Tuen Ma Line's first phase, The Lion Rock Tunnel was constructed and is nearby the north portal of Beacon Hill Tunnel.

== History ==
Old Beacon Hill Tunnel
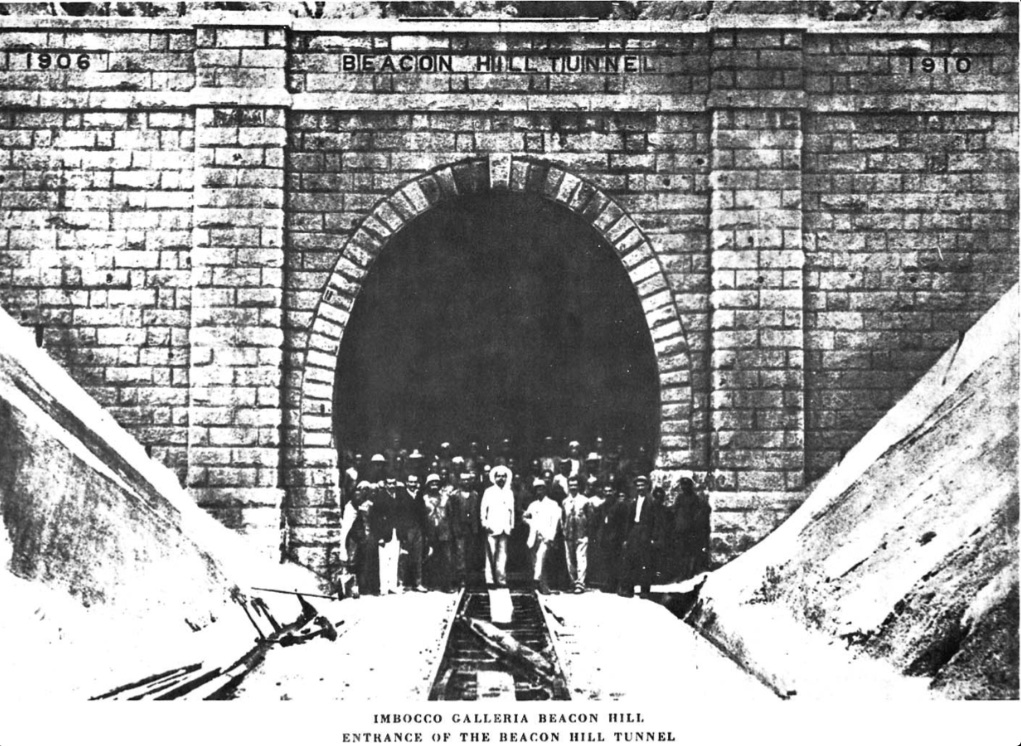
- Old Beacon Hill Tunnel in 1910, south portal
- Interactive map of Old Beacon Hill Tunnel

Overview
- Status: Disused for train, now occupied by town gas pipeline
- System: Kowloon–Canton Railway
- Start: Kowloon Tong
- End: Tai Wai

Operation
- Opened: 1 October 1910; 115 years ago
- Closed: 24 April 1981; 45 years ago

Technical
- Length: 2.2 km (1.4 mi)
- No. of tracks: Single
- Track gauge: 1,435 mm (4 ft 8 1/2 in)
- Tunnel clearance: 5.8 m (19 ft)
- Width: 5.2 m (17 ft)

=== First tunnel ===
A team of surveyors was commissioned to plan the route for the KCR British Section in 1905. Two routes were proposed:

1. Construction of a tunnel 1.5 mile (2.4 km) long through Beacon Hill, then following the west coast of Tolo Harbour
2. Routing through western New Territories and Castle Peak Bay

Although option two was less of an engineering challenge, the overall route was longer, and passed through less economically active areas; therefore option one was selected. Works on the 35.4 kilometres (22.0 mi) railway to the border started early 1906. Construction of the tunnel, referred to as Tunnel No.2 in the plan (since it was the second tunnel out from the Kowloon terminus), was the greatest engineering project in Asia of its time.

Construction of the tunnel presented great engineering challenges during construction of the line, and local workers were very reluctant to work underground due to feng shui-related objections. In the end, Italian workers were employed. The tunnel cost £298,500 to build and opened with the rest of the line on 1 October 1910, together with four smaller tunnels along the line. It accommodated a single standard track with a standard gauge of 1,435 mm (4 ft 8 1/2 in). Throughout its operating life, the tunnel was noted for its fume problems, due to its relatively steep gradient of 1%.

The tunnel was closed upon completion of the new one, and is now partially occupied by several town gas pipelines, operated by The Hong Kong and China Gas Company. The potential for damage to the pipes was a factor in determining the intensity of blasting during construction of the Sha Tin to Central Link, thereby protecting the old tunnel as a whole.

=== Second tunnel ===
As part of the modernisation of the KCR, under reformist Governor Murray MacLehose, a double-tracked, electrified tunnel was built 30 to 40 metres (98 ft 5 in to 131 ft 3 in) west of the original one. Work started in 1978. The main contractor was Aoki Corporation and the tunnel was built at a cost of about HK$78 million. It was broken through on 23 April 1980. The tunnel was completed by 1981, enabling the KCRC to introduce a metro-standard service to serve the rapidly growing new towns north of the mountain range.

== Dimensions ==
=== First tunnel ===
- single track
- 2.2 km long
- horseshoe-shaped, 5.2 metres (17 ft 1 in) wide by 5.8 metres (19 ft 0 in) high above rail level.
- up to 427 metres below ground
- tunnel lining upgraded in 1982 and 2008

=== Second tunnel ===
- double track
- 2.3 km long
- horseshoe-shaped, 11 metres wide by 9 metres high
