= Tomari Nuclear Power Plant =

Nuclear power plant in Hokkaido, Japan

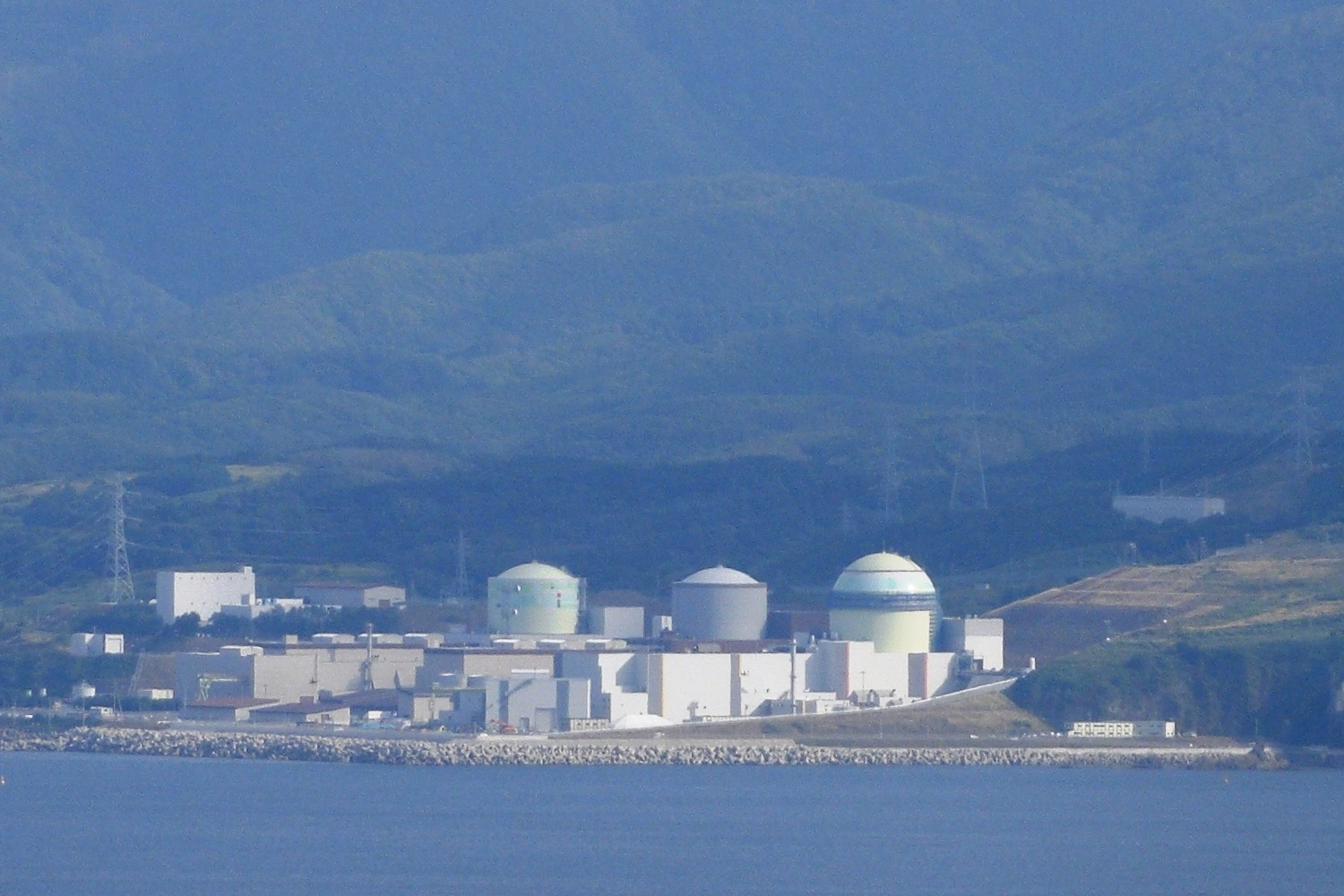
- The Tomari Nuclear Power Plant
- Country: Japan
- Coordinates: 43°2′10″N 140°30′45″E
- Status: Out of service for 14 years, 5 months
- Construction began: April 18, 1985
- Commission date: June 22, 1989
- Operator: Hokkaido Electric Power Company

Power generation
- Units operational: 2 × 579 MW; 1 × 912 MW
- Nameplate capacity: 2070 MW
- Capacity factor: 0
- Annual net output: 0 GW·h

External links
- Website: www.hepco.co.jp/ato_env_ene/atomic/atomic.html
- Commons: Related media on Commons

The Tomari Nuclear Power Plant (泊発電所, Tomari hatsudensho; Tomari NPP) is the only nuclear power plant in Hokkaidō, Japan. It is located in the town of Tomari in the Furuu District and is managed by the Hokkaido Electric Power Company. All of the reactors are Mitsubishi designs. The plant site totals 1,350,000 m^{2} (334 acres), with an additional 70,000 m^{2} of reclaimed land.

== History ==
The plant was originally going to be located on an island and be named the Kyowa-Tomari NPP, but there was a change in plans, and the location and name was changed.

On 17 August 2000, a worker fell into a sump tank in a radioactive waste treatment building of the plant. The worker died in the hospital later. In July 2007, there were three separate fires related to the new unit that was under construction. Electrical wiring had apparently been cut and foul play was suspected. This came just days after a serious earthquake and related events at the Kashiwazaki-Kariwa plant. On September 29, 2007, Kazutoshi Michinaka reported that there was no radiation leakage and no one was hurt after a small fire at the half-built third reactor occurred. At least 7 arson cases have been reported at the construction site in 2007.

On March 11, 2011, at the time of the Tohoku earthquake, the Number 3 reactor was undergoing the last phase of its regular inspection, a so-called "adjustment operation", which had started on March 7. Typically, reactors in Japan are brought into full commercial operation about 1 month after starting this adjustment, but because of the aftermath of the Fukushima-disaster, Hokkaido Electric Power Company withheld the final Nuclear and Industrial Safety Agency (NISA) check-up application. When the utility filed it in early August 2011, the Number 3 reactor had been operating on trial and providing electricity at nearly full power for 5 months. NISA reported to the Nuclear Safety Commission (NSC) on 11 August that no problems were found in the reactor during a 2-day final check that ended on 10 August. According to NISA, the reactor could safely be restarted, but the Hokkaido governor criticized the operator for submitting the application before it had reached its own decision on restarting (Japanese law does not require local governments' agreement to restart nuclear reactors, but in practice, both government and nuclear operators have always respected their will). Industry minister Banri Kaieda told then Governor Harumi Takahashi that the prefecture's consent was vital, and that he would wait for their decision.

On August 17, 2011, the Japanese Government approved the restart of reactor Number 3. This was the first nuclear reactor given permission to be taken into service again after the events in Fukushima of March 11, 2011.

On May 5, 2012, the reactor Number 3 was shut down for regular inspections, meaning of all 50 reactors in Japan, none were producing energy, which has only occurred once before, between 30 April and 4 May 1970, since the start of Japanese commercial nuclear power generation in 1966. After the nuclear disaster in Fukushima in March 2011, Japanese public opinion shifted away from nuclear power generation. The shutdown of the last active nuclear power plant caused a demonstration of thousands in Tokyo celebrating a "nuclear-free" Japan.

In April 2025, reactor Number 3 was cleared by the Nuclear Regulation Authority, planned to restart in June 2027 after passing stricter post-Fukushima safety inspections.

On December 11, 2025, the governor of Hokkaido, Naomichi Suzuki, announced at a meeting of the Hokkaido Prefectural Assembly after the four municipalities surrounding the nuclear plant, Tomari, Kyowa, Iwanai, and Kamoenai previously expressed their approval.

In October 2026, Hokkaido Electric Power confirmed that construction of the plant's new seawall remained scheduled for completion in August 2027. Construction began in March 2024; the approximately 1,200-metre-long wall is designed to reach 19 metres above sea level and rest directly on bedrock.

== Reactors on site ==
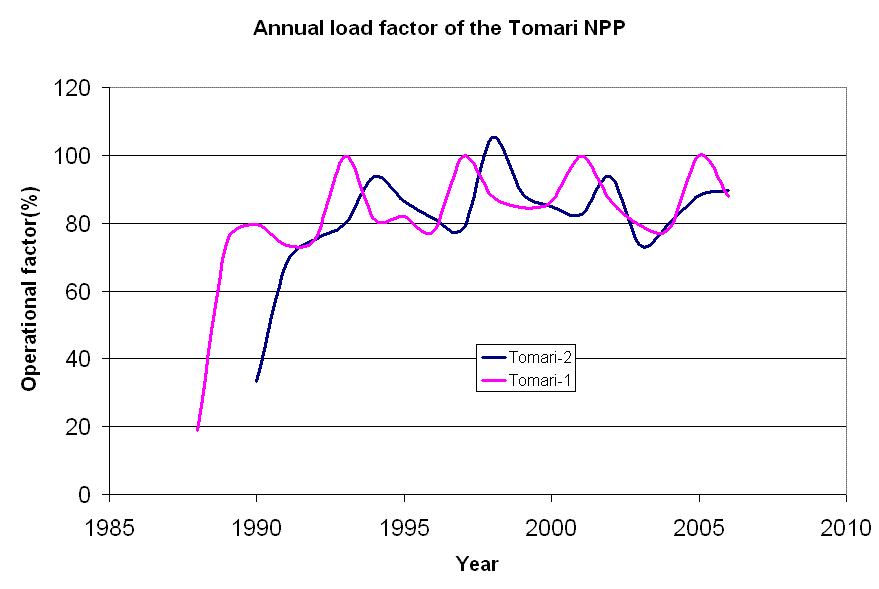
Annual load factors

Unit	Type	Commission date	Electric Power
Tomari – 1	PWR	June 22, 1989	579 MW
Tomari – 2	PWR	April 12, 1991	579 MW
Tomari – 3	PWR	December 22, 2009	912 MW

== Stress-tests ==
Seismic research in 2011 showed that the March 11 quake was caused by the simultaneous movement of multiple active faults at the coast of the Pacific Ocean in northern Japan and that much bigger earthquakes could be triggered than the plants were built to withstand. In February, the Tokai Daini Plant in Ibaraki Prefecture and the Tomari power facility in Hokkaido said that they could not rule out the possibility that the plants were vulnerable. Other nuclear power stations declared that the active faults near their nuclear plants would not move at the same time, and even if it did happen, the impact would be limited. NISA is to look into the evaluation of active faults done by the plants.

== See also ==
- List of nuclear power plants in Japan
