= Beacon Hill (Hong Kong) =

Hill in Hong Kong

Beacon Hill, Hong Kong
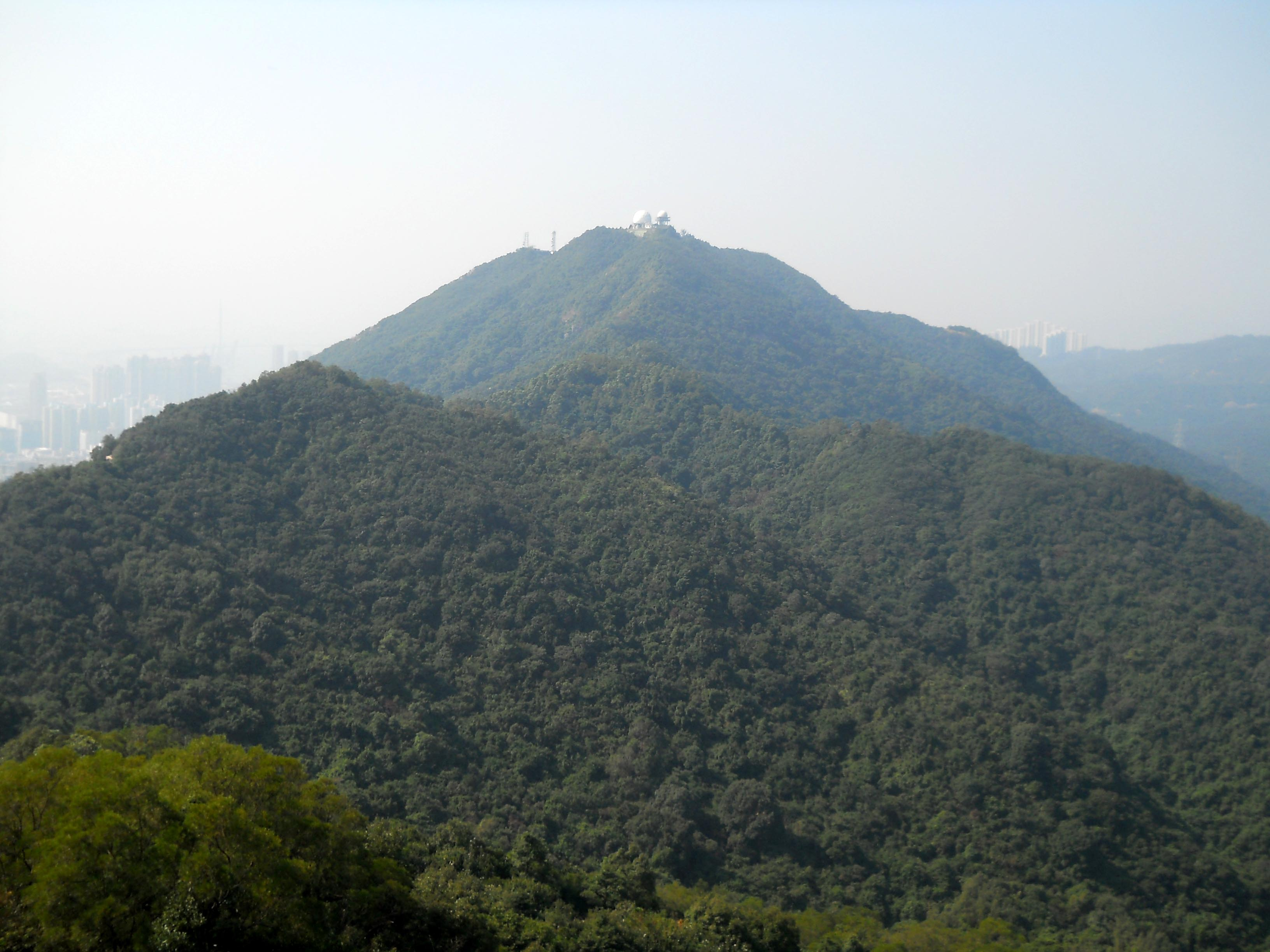
- View of Beacon Hill

Highest point
- Elevation: 457 m (1,499 ft); HKPD
- Coordinates: 22°20′59.19″N 114°10′12.51″E

Geography
- Location within Hong Kong
- Location: New Territories, Hong Kong

Beacon Hill
- Traditional Chinese: 畢架山
- Simplified Chinese: 毕架山
- Literal meaning: Pen Shelf Hill
Transcriptions
Standard Mandarin
- Hanyu Pinyin: Bìjiàshān / Bìjià Shān
Hakka
- Romanization: Bed1 Ga3 San1
Yue: Cantonese
- Yale Romanization: bāt ga sāan
- Jyutping: Bat1 Gaa3 Saan1

Beacon Hill (Chinese: 筆架山; Jyutping: bat1 gaa3 saan1) is a hill in the northern part of the Kowloon peninsula in Hong Kong. It is the 71st-highest hill of Hong Kong and is 457m tall. Beacon Hill is located within the Lion Rock Country Park. The tower and its relevant equipment on the top of Beacon Hill is not open to the public and is a secured facility controlled and maintained by the Hong Kong Civil Aviation Department.

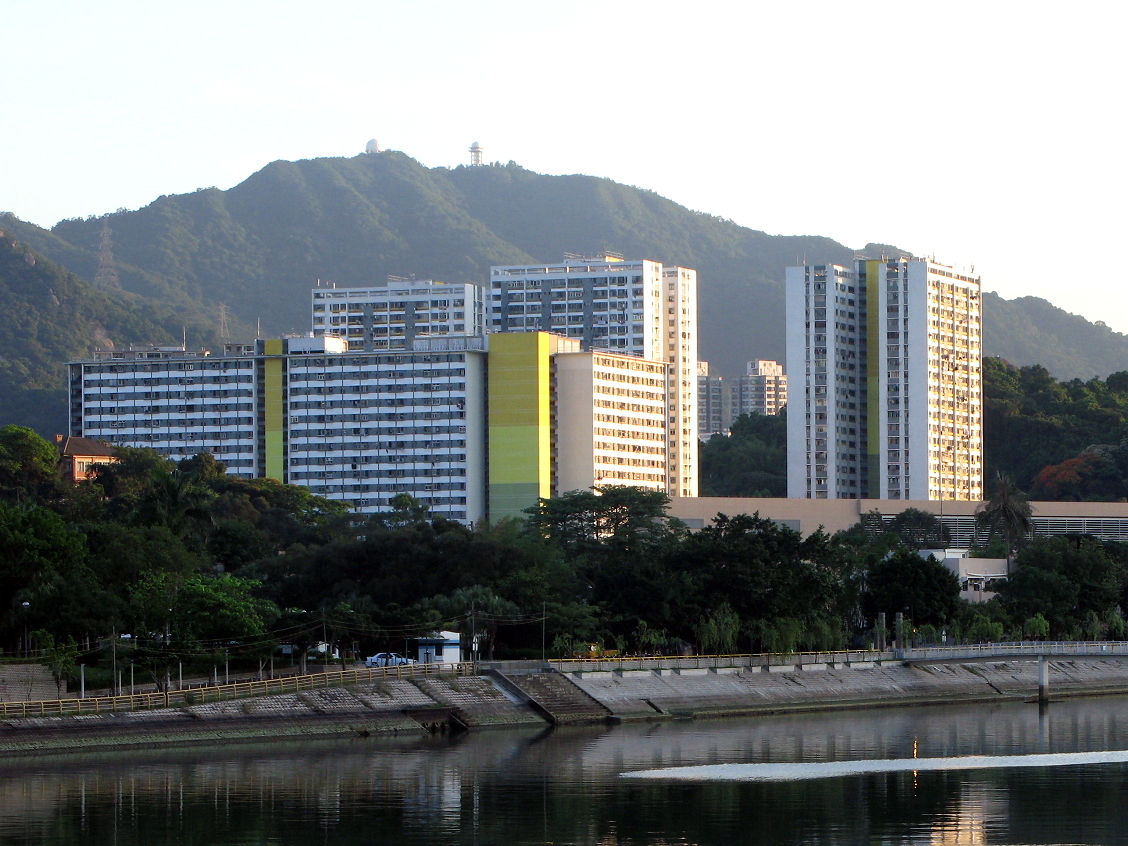
Chun Shek Estate with Beacon Hill located in the background.

== Name ==
The hill's name dates back to the Great Clearance between 1661 and 1669, which required the complete evacuation of the coastal areas of Kowloon in Hong Kong in order to fight against and then subsequently defeat the anti-Qing movement that was first started and largely led by surviving Ming Dynasty loyalists carrying on the struggle against the new Manchu-formed Qing Dynasty. Qing military garrisons were created and stationed throughout most of Kowloon's coastal areas to enforce the Qing government's decree in locations which later became referred to as beacons.

== Conservation ==
The steep north face of Beacon Hill, together with a valley to the north-east of Eagle's Nest, covering a total area of 53.2 hectares, was designated as a Site of Special Scientific Interest in 1979.

== See also ==
- Geography of Hong Kong
- Eight Mountains of Kowloon
- Beacon Hill School, Hong Kong
- Beacon Hill Tunnel
- Lion Rock
- MacLehose Trail
