= Niikappu Dam =

Dam in Hokkaido Prefecture, Japan

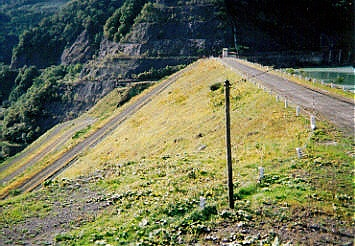

- Location within Japan
- Location: Hokkaido Prefecture, Japan
- Coordinates: 42°36′24″N 142°33′25″E
- Construction began: 1970
- Opening date: 1974

Dam and spillways
- Height: 102.8 m (337 ft)
- Length: 326 m (1,070 ft)
- Dam volume: 3071 thousand cubic meters

Reservoir
- Total capacity: 145000 thousand cubic meters
- Catchment area: 309.9 sq. km
- Surface area: 435 hectares

Niikappu Dam (Japanese: 新冠ダム) is a rockfill dam located in Hokkaido Prefecture in Japan. The dam is used for power production. The catchment area of the dam is 309.9 km^{2}. The dam impounds about 435 ha of land when full and can store 145000 thousand cubic meters of water. The construction of the dam was started on 1970 and completed in 1974.
