= Okuniikappu Dam =

Dam in Hokkaido Prefecture, Japan

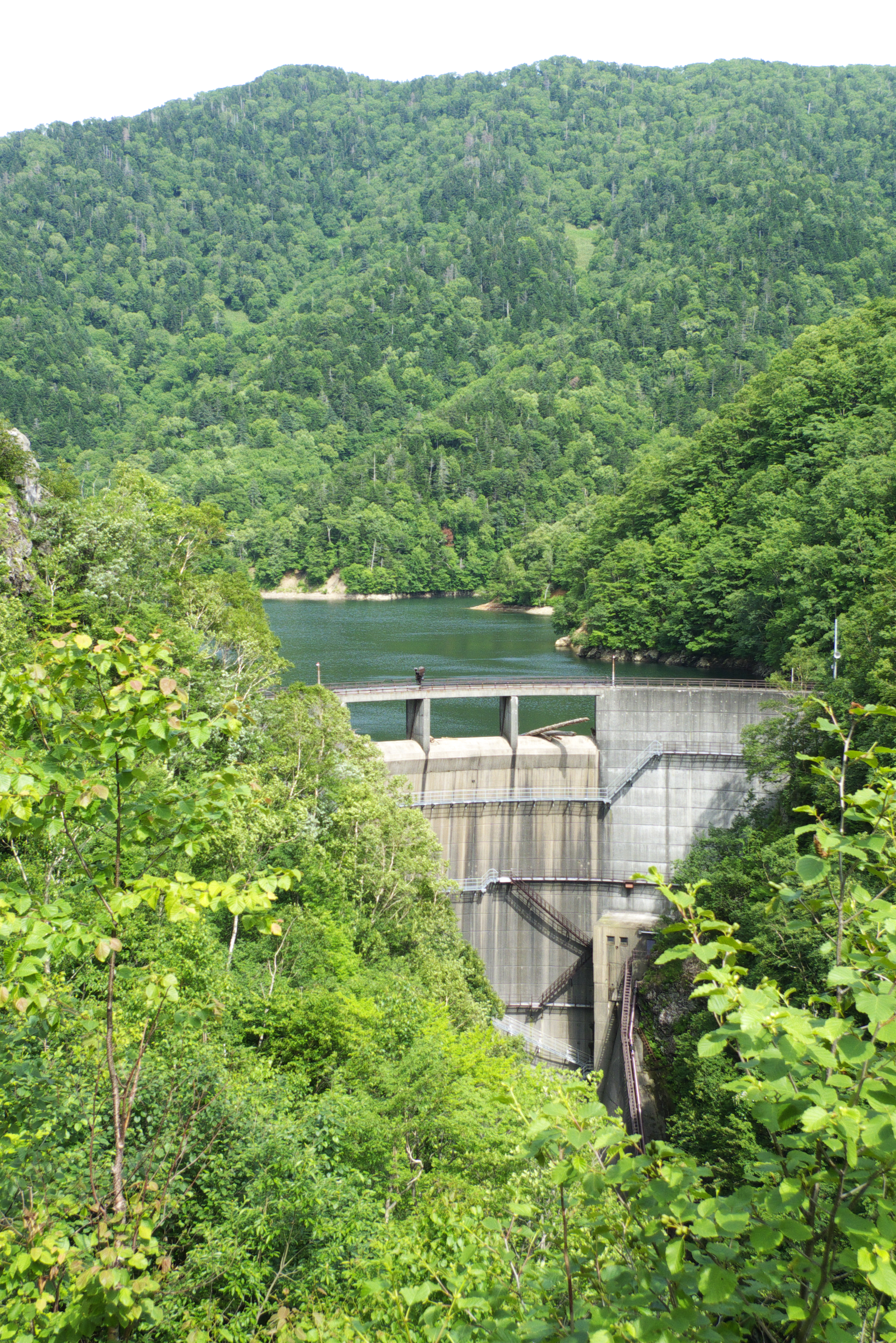

- Location within Japan
- Location: Hokkaido Prefecture, Japan
- Coordinates: 42°40′26″N 142°40′40″E
- Construction began: 1958
- Opening date: 1963

Dam and spillways
- Height: 61.2 m (201 ft)
- Length: 110 m (360 ft)

Reservoir
- Total capacity: 6,665,000 m^{3} (235,400,000 cu ft)
- Catchment area: 179.1 km^{2} (69.2 sq mi)
- Surface area: 33 hectares (82 acres)

Okuniikappu Dam (Japanese: 奥新冠ダム) is an arch dam located in Hokkaido Prefecture in Japan. The dam is used for power production. The catchment area of the dam is 179.1 km^{2}. The dam impounds about 33 ha of land when full and can store 6665 thousand cubic meters of water. The construction of the dam was started on 1958 and completed in 1963.
