= Shizunai River =

River in Hokkaidō, Japan

Shizunai River 静内川
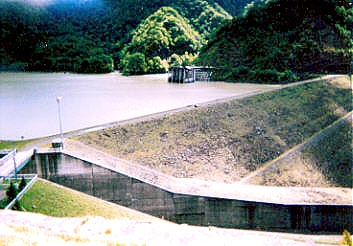
- Takami Dam (November 2006)

- Location within Japan
- Etymology: Ainu language: Shiputnai — A marsh at the origin of the Ainu or Shuttonai — A marsh with plentiful grapes or Shutnai — A river at the foot of a mountain.
- Native name: Shizunai-gawa (Japanese)

Location
- Country: Japan
- State: Hokkaidō
- Region: Hidaka Subprefecture
- District: Hidaka District
- Municipality: Shinhidaka

Physical characteristics
- Source confluence: Koikakushushibichari River and Koibokushushibichari River
  - coordinates: 42°28′22″N 142°45′05″E
  - elevation: 300 m (980 ft)
- Mouth: Pacific Ocean
  - coordinates: 42°19′47″N 142°22′05″E
  - elevation: 0 m (0 ft)
- Length: 69.9 km (43.4 mi)
- Basin size: 683.4 km^{2} (263.9 sq mi)

Basin features
- Tributaries
  - left: Hidaka Mena River (日高目名川, Hidaka Mena-gawa), Mount Sumi River (炭山, Sumi-yama-kawa), Shunbetsu River, Penkeonikemushi River, Ponpanbetsu Creek, Penkebetsusawa River, Porokaunnai River
  - right: Perari River, Poyoppusawa River, Pisenaisawa River, Ibetsusawa River, Abeunnai River

Shizunai River (静内川, Shizunai-gawa) is a river in Shinhidaka, Hokkaidō, Japan. The Shizunai River drains from the Hidaka Mountains into the Pacific Ocean.

== Etymology ==
The Shizunai River was known as Shibuchari and Shibechari. This name was derived from Shipe-ichan, meaning "a salmon spawning place" in Ainu.

The name Shizunai is derived from the Ainu language and has three possible sources:

- Shiputnai – A marsh at the origin of the Ainu.
- Shuttonai – A marsh with many grapes.
- Shutnai – A river at the foot of a mountain.

== Course ==
The Shizunai River flows generally southwest from its headwaters in the Hidaka mountains at the confluence of the Koikakushushibichari and Koibokushushibichari rivers. It flows into Lake Takami (高見湖, Takami-ko), a reservoir created by the Takami Dam. Past the dam, the Shizunai river flows into Shizunai Flood Control Reservoir (静内調整池, Shizunai Chōseichi). Past the Shizunai Dam, the river encounters Futa Dam before leaving the mountains for the flood plain. The river flows past the outlying communities of Shizunai before entering the Pacific Ocean just northwest of Shizunai harbor.

== Natural history ==
The Shizunai River was designated as a wildlife protection area in 1965. Whooper swans overwinter on the Shizunai River.

== History ==
The Shizunai River basin was the home of the Ainu leader who led Shakushain's revolt against the Shogunate-era Yamato people, especially the Matsumae clan, in the 1660s. In the Edo period the region was used for gold mining.

== Lists ==
=== List of bridges and dams ===
From river mouth to source:

- Shizunai Bridge (静内橋, Shizunai Bashi)
- Rubeshibe Bridge (碧蘂 橋, Rubeshibe Bashi)
- Misono Bridge (御園橋, Misono Bashi)
- Futa Dam (双ダム, Futa Damu)
- Shizunai Dam (静内ダム, Shizunai Damu)
- Menashi River Bridge (目梨別橋, Menashibetsu Bashi)
- Takami Dam (高見ダム, Takami Damu)
- Takami Bridge (高見橋, Takami Bashi)
- Ibetsu Bridge (威別大橋, Ibetsu Ōhashi)

=== List of (named) tributaries ===
From river mouth to source:

1. Left — Hidaka Mena River (日高目名川, Hidaka Mena Gawa)
2. Right — Perari River
3. Left — Mount Sumi River (炭山, Sumiyama Kawa) charcoal or coal mountain river
4. Left — Shunbetsu River
5. Right — Poyoppusawa River
6. Right — Pisenaisawa River
7. Left — Penkeonikemushi River
8. Left — Ponpanbetsu Creek
9. Left — Penkebetsusawa River
10. Left — Porokaunnai River
11. Right — Ibetsusawa River
12. Right — Abeunnai River
13. Confluence Left — Koibokushuchchari, Right — Koikakushuppichari
