= List of dams in Yamanashi Prefecture =

The following is a list of dams in Yamanashi Prefecture, Japan.

== List ==
Name	Location	Started	Opened	Height	Length	Image	DiJ number
Amahata Dam			1967	80.5 m (264 ft)	147.6 m (484 ft)		0969
Arakawa Dam		1973	1985	88 m (289 ft)	320 m (1,050 ft)		0973
Daimon Dam		1968	1987	65.5 m (215 ft)	180 m (590 ft)		0972
Fukashiro Dam		2004	2004	87 m (285 ft)			0975
Hirose Dam		1965	1974	75 m (246 ft)	255 m (837 ft)		0971
Horisawagawa Dam		1924	1928	17.3 m (57 ft)	41.8 m (137 ft)		0961
Kakimoto Dam			1952	46.1 m (151 ft)	215 m (705 ft)		0965
Kamihikawa Dam		1999		87 m (285 ft)			3106
Kamikurizawagawa Dam		1926	1927	19 m (62 ft)	49.6 m (163 ft)		0960
Kazunogawa Dam		1999		105.2 m (345 ft)			3107
Kokanba Dam		1962	1963	16 m (52 ft)	86.2 m (283 ft)		0968
Kotogawa Dam		1985	2007	64 m (210 ft)	262 m (860 ft)		2914
Maruyama Tameike Dam			1988	19 m (62 ft)	89 m (292 ft)		0963
Nishiyama Dam		1954	Apr 1957	40.6 m (133 ft)	112.3 m (368 ft)		0966
Ohno Dam		1910	1914	37.3 m (122 ft)	309.1 m (1,014 ft)		0955
Oshino Tameike Dam			1933	27.4 m (90 ft)	111 m (364 ft)		3431
Ryuga-ike Dam			1956	17 m (56 ft)	382 m (1,253 ft)		0956
Shiokawa Dam		1975	1997	79 m (259 ft)	225 m (738 ft)		0974
Shionosawa Dam							
Toshima Dam							
Ushirozawa Tameike Dam			1939	22.7 m (74 ft)	115 m (377 ft)		0964
Zusazawa Dam		1925	1926	21.5 m (71 ft)	75.8 m (249 ft)		0959

== See also ==
- Media related to Dams in Yamanashi prefecture at Wikimedia Commons
