= List of dams in Okinawa Prefecture =

The following is a list of dams in Okinawa Prefecture, Japan.

== List ==
Name	Location	Started	Opened	Height	Length	Image	DiJ number
Aha Dam		1971	1982	86 m (282 ft)			2898
Arakawa Dam		1971	1976	44.5 m (146 ft)			2895
Benoki Dam		1975	1987	42 m (138 ft)	560.1 m (1,838 ft)		2901
Fukuji Dam		1969	1974	91.7 m (301 ft)			2894
Fukuzato Underground Dam			18 Dec 1998	27 m (89 ft)			
Funkawa Dam		1971	1982	41.5 m (136 ft)	210 m (690 ft)		2899
Gakiya Dam				33 m (108 ft)			3143
Gatabaru Dam							
Ginama Dam							
Ginoza Dam							
Haneji Dam			2004	66.5 m (218 ft)			2902
Henoko Dam							
Ishigaki Dam							
Ishikawa Dam							
Kanna Dam		1982	May 1993	45 m (148 ft)			2904
Kinjo Dam		1989	2000	19 m (62 ft)			2905
Kisenbaru Dam							
Kurashiki Dam			1994	33.5 m (110 ft)	441 m (1,447 ft)		2911
Kushiokawa Dam				19.7 m (65 ft)			3319
Nabekawa Dam				29 m (95 ft)			2908
Nagura Dam				38.7 m (127 ft)			2909
Maezato Dam			Mar 1983	27 m (89 ft)			2897
Makiya Dam				33.6 m (110 ft)			2910
Nagahama Dam				48.3 m (158 ft)			2906
Okawa Dam							
Okukubi Dam			Mar 2013	39 m (128 ft)			3147
Onna Dam				28.5 m (94 ft)			2935
Oura Dam				35.5 m (116 ft)			2896
Sokobaru dam			4 Nov 1992	29.5 m (97 ft)			2903
Taiho Dam		1987	2010	77.5 m (254 ft)	363.3 m (1,192 ft)		2965
Tobukuro Dam							
Yamashiro Dam				29.9 m (98 ft)			2893
Zukeyama Dam			Feb 1961				

== See also ==
- Media related to Dams in Okinawa prefecture at Wikimedia Commons
