= Arakawa Dam =

Arakawa Dam may refer to:

- Arakawa Dam (Okinawa)
- Arakawa Dam (Yamanashi)
