= Ohno Dam =

Ohno Dam may refer to:

- Ohno Dam (Hokkaido)
- Ohno Dam (Iwate)
- Ohno Dam (Yamanashi)
