= Nishiyama Dam =

Nishiyama Dam may refer to:

- Nishiyama Dam (Kōchi)
- Nishiyama Dam (Yamanashi)
