= Horisawagawa Dam =

Dam in Yamanashi Prefecture, Japan

- Location within Japan
- Interactive map of Horisawagawa Dam
- Location: Yamanashi Prefecture, Japan
- Coordinates: 35°29′27″N 138°16′33″E
- Construction began: 1924
- Opening date: 1928

Dam and spillways
- Height: 17.3 m (57 ft)
- Length: 41.8 m (137 ft)

Reservoir
- Total capacity: 6 thousand cubic meters
- Catchment area: 114.5 sq. km
- Surface area: hectares

Horisawagawa Dam is a gravity dam located in Yamanashi Prefecture in Japan. The dam is used for power production. The catchment area of the dam is 114.5 km^{2}. The dam impounds about ha of land when full and can store 6 thousand cubic meters of water. The construction of the dam was started on 1924 and completed in 1928.
