= Kotogawa Dam =

Dam in Yamanashi Prefecture, Japan

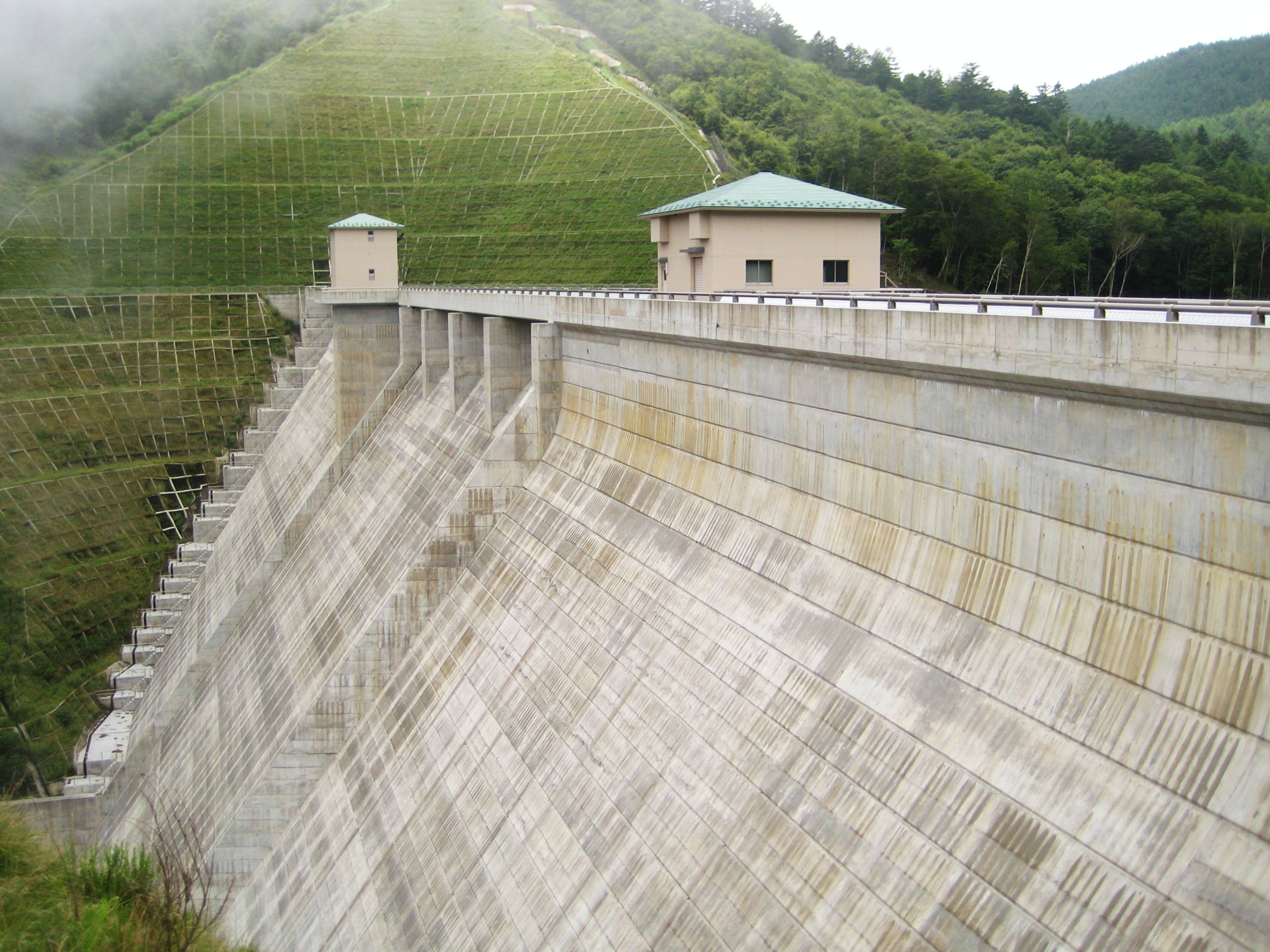

- Location within Japan
- Location: Yamanashi Prefecture, Japan
- Coordinates: 35°48′04″N 138°39′31″E
- Construction began: 1985
- Opening date: 2007

Dam and spillways
- Height: 64 m (210 ft)
- Length: 262 m (860 ft)

Reservoir
- Total capacity: 5150 thousand cubic meters
- Catchment area: 10 sq. km
- Surface area: 30 hectares

Kotogawa Dam is a gravity dam located in Yamanashi Prefecture in Japan. The dam is used for flood control, water supply and power production. The catchment area of the dam is 10 km^{2}. The dam impounds about 30 ha of land when full and can store 5150 thousand cubic meters of water. The construction of the dam was started on 1985 and completed in 2007.
