= Kamikurizawagawa Dam =

Dam in Yamanashi Prefecture, Japan

- Location within Japan
- Interactive map of Kamikurizawagawa Dam
- Location: Yamanashi Prefecture, Japan
- Coordinates: 35°44′38″N 138°21′27″E
- Construction began: 1926
- Opening date: 1927

Dam and spillways
- Height: 19 m (62 ft)
- Length: 49.6 m (163 ft)

Reservoir
- Total capacity: 9 thousand cubic meters
- Catchment area: 34.3 sq. km
- Surface area: 1 hectares

Kamikurizawagawa Dam is a gravity dam located in Yamanashi Prefecture in Japan. The dam is used for power production. The catchment area of the dam is 34.3 km^{2}. The dam impounds about 1 ha of land when full and can store 9 thousand cubic meters of water. The construction of the dam was started on 1926 and completed in 1927.
