= Benoki Dam =

Dam in Okinawa Prefecture, Japan

- Location: Okinawa Prefecture, Japan
- Coordinates: 26°47′10″N 128°15′24″E
- Construction began: 1975
- Opening date: 1987

Dam and spillways
- Height: 42m
- Length: 560.1m

Reservoir
- Total capacity: 4500
- Catchment area: 8.1
- Surface area: 50 hectares

Benoki Dam is a combination of gravity and fill dam located in Okinawa prefecture in Japan. The dam is used for flood control, water supply and irrigation. The catchment area of the dam is 8.1 km^{2}. The dam impounds about 50 ha of land when full and can store 4500 thousand cubic meters of water. The construction of the dam was started on 1975 and completed in 1987.
