= Ohno Dam (Yamanashi) =

Dam in Yamanashi Prefecture, Japan

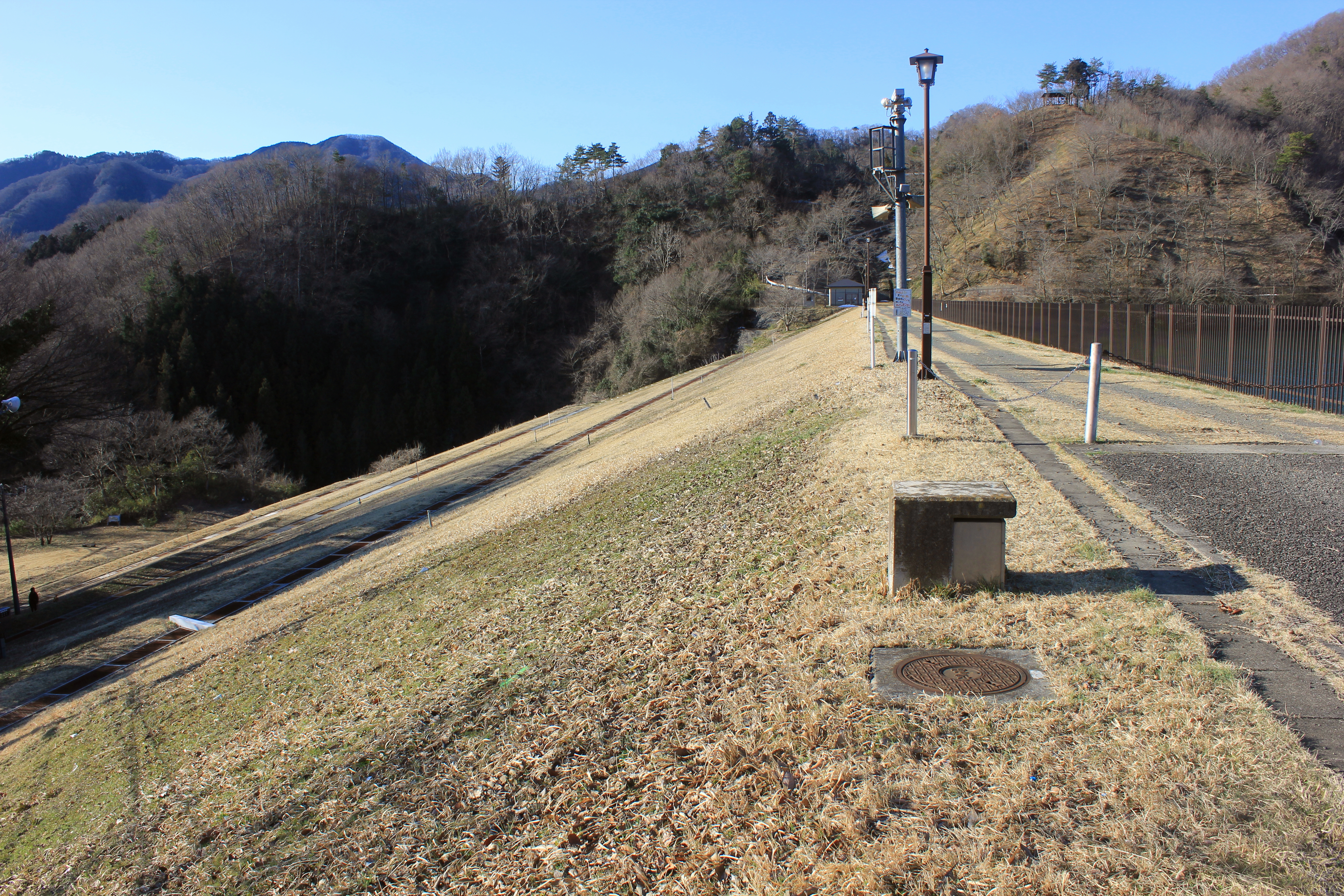

- Location within Japan
- Location: Yamanashi Prefecture, Japan
- Coordinates: 35°37′10″N 139°3′35″E
- Construction began: 1910
- Opening date: 1914

Dam and spillways
- Height: 37.3 m (122 ft)
- Length: 309.1 m (1,014 ft)

Reservoir
- Total capacity: 1,692,000 m^{3} (59,800,000 cu ft)
- Catchment area: 487.9 km^{2} (188.4 sq mi)
- Surface area: 15 hectares (37 acres)

Ohno Dam is an earthfill dam located in Yamanashi Prefecture in Japan. The dam is used for power production. The catchment area of the dam is 487.9 km^{2}. The dam impounds about 15 ha of land when full and can store 1692 thousand cubic meters of water. The construction of the dam was started on 1910 and completed in 1914.
