= Oshino Tameike Dam =

Dam in Yamanashi Prefecture, Japan

Oshino Tameike
- Location within Japan
- Location: Yamanashi Prefecture, Japan
- Coordinates: 35°35′52″N 139°0′25″E
- Opening date: 1933

Dam and spillways
- Height: 27.4 m (90 ft)
- Length: 111 m (364 ft)

Reservoir
- Total capacity: 141,000 m^{3} (5,000,000 cu ft)
- Catchment area: 1.7 km^{2} (0.66 sq mi)
- Surface area: 2 hectares (4.9 acres)

Oshino Tameike is an earthfill dam located in Yamanashi Prefecture in Japan. The dam is used for irrigation. The catchment area of the dam is 1.7 km^{2}. The dam impounds about 2 ha of land when full and can store 141 thousand cubic meters of water. The construction of the dam was completed in 1933.
