= Kokanba Dam =

Dam in Yamanashi Prefecture, Japan

- Location within Japan
- Location: Yamanashi Prefecture, Japan
- Coordinates: 35°41′34″N 138°16′39″E
- Construction began: 1962
- Opening date: 1963

Dam and spillways
- Height: 16 m (52 ft)
- Length: 86.2 m (283 ft)

Reservoir
- Total capacity: 28 thousand cubic meters
- Catchment area: 62.2 sq. km
- Surface area: 1 hectares

Kokanba Dam is a gravity dam located in Yamanashi Prefecture in Japan. The dam is used for power production. The catchment area of the dam is 62.2 km^{2}. The dam impounds about 1 ha of land when full and can store 28 thousand cubic meters of water. The construction of the dam was started on 1962 and completed in 1963.
