= Taiho Dam =

Dam in Okinawa Prefecture, Japan

- Location: Okinawa Prefecture, Japan
- Coordinates: 26°39′12″N 128°8′46″E
- Construction began: 1987
- Opening date: 2010

Dam and spillways
- Height: 77.5m
- Length: 363.3m

Reservoir
- Total capacity: 20050
- Catchment area: 13.3
- Surface area: 89 hectares

Taiho Dam is a concrete gravity dam located in Okinawa prefecture in Japan. The dam is used for flood control and water supply. The catchment area of the dam is 13.3 km^{2}. The dam impounds about 89 ha of land when full and can store 20050 thousand cubic meters of water. The construction of the dam was started on 1987 and completed in 2010.
