= Aha Dam =

Dam in Okinawa Prefecture, Japan

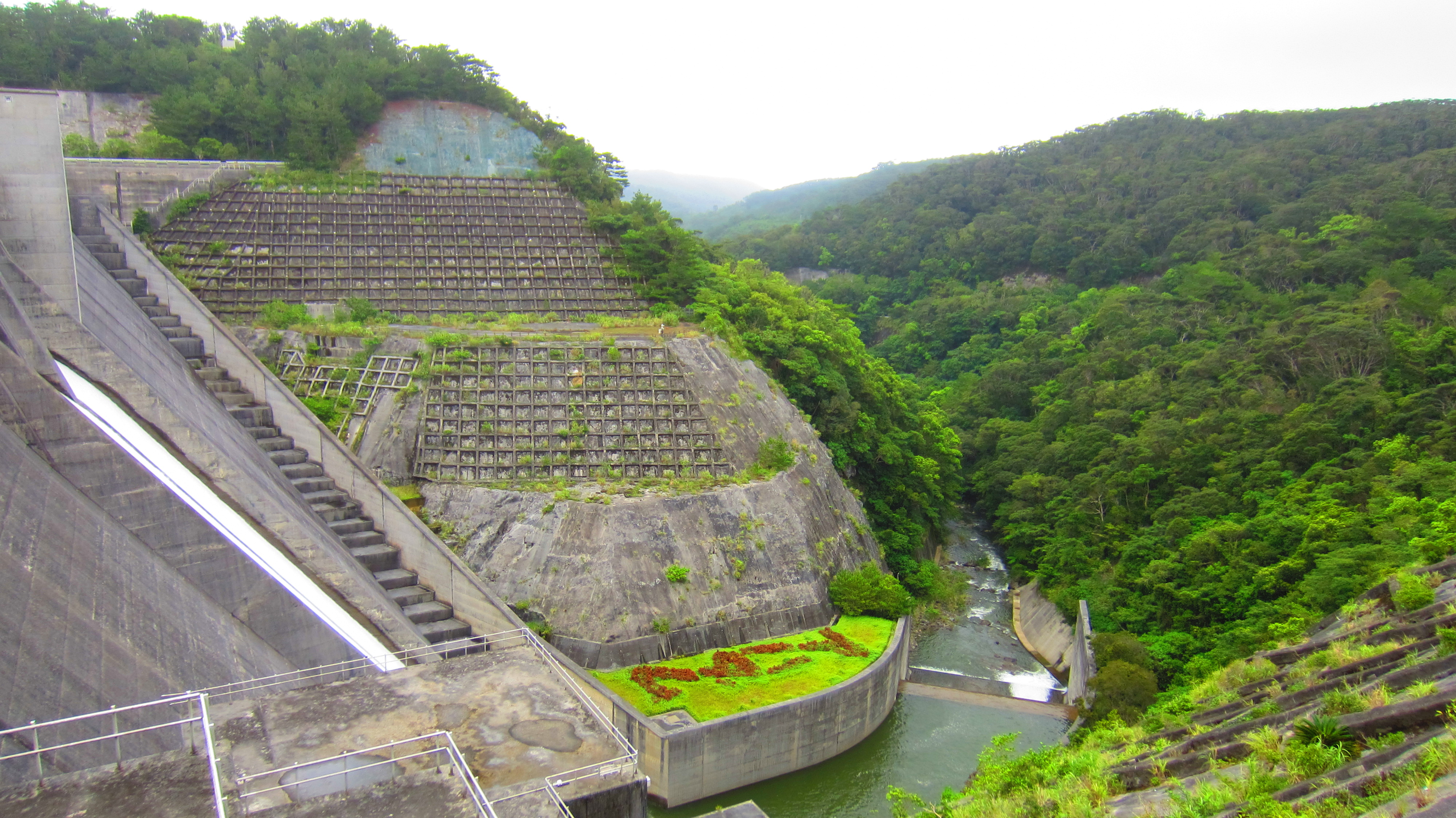
- Interactive map of Aha Dam
- Location: Okinawa Prefecture, Japan
- Coordinates: 26°42′38″N 128°16′09″E
- Construction began: 1971
- Opening date: 1982

Dam and spillways
- Height: 86 m
- Length: 245 m

Reservoir
- Total capacity: 18.6 million m^{3}
- Catchment area: 2 km^{2}
- Surface area: 83 hectares

Aha Dam (Japanese:アハダム)is a concrete gravity dam located in Okinawa prefecture of Japan. The dam is used to collect drinking water for water supply, irrigation and flood control. The catchment area of the dam is 39.5 km^{2}. The dam impounds about 83 ha of land when full and can store 18.6 million cubic meters of water. The construction of the dam started on 1971 and completed in 1982.
