= Fukuji Dam =

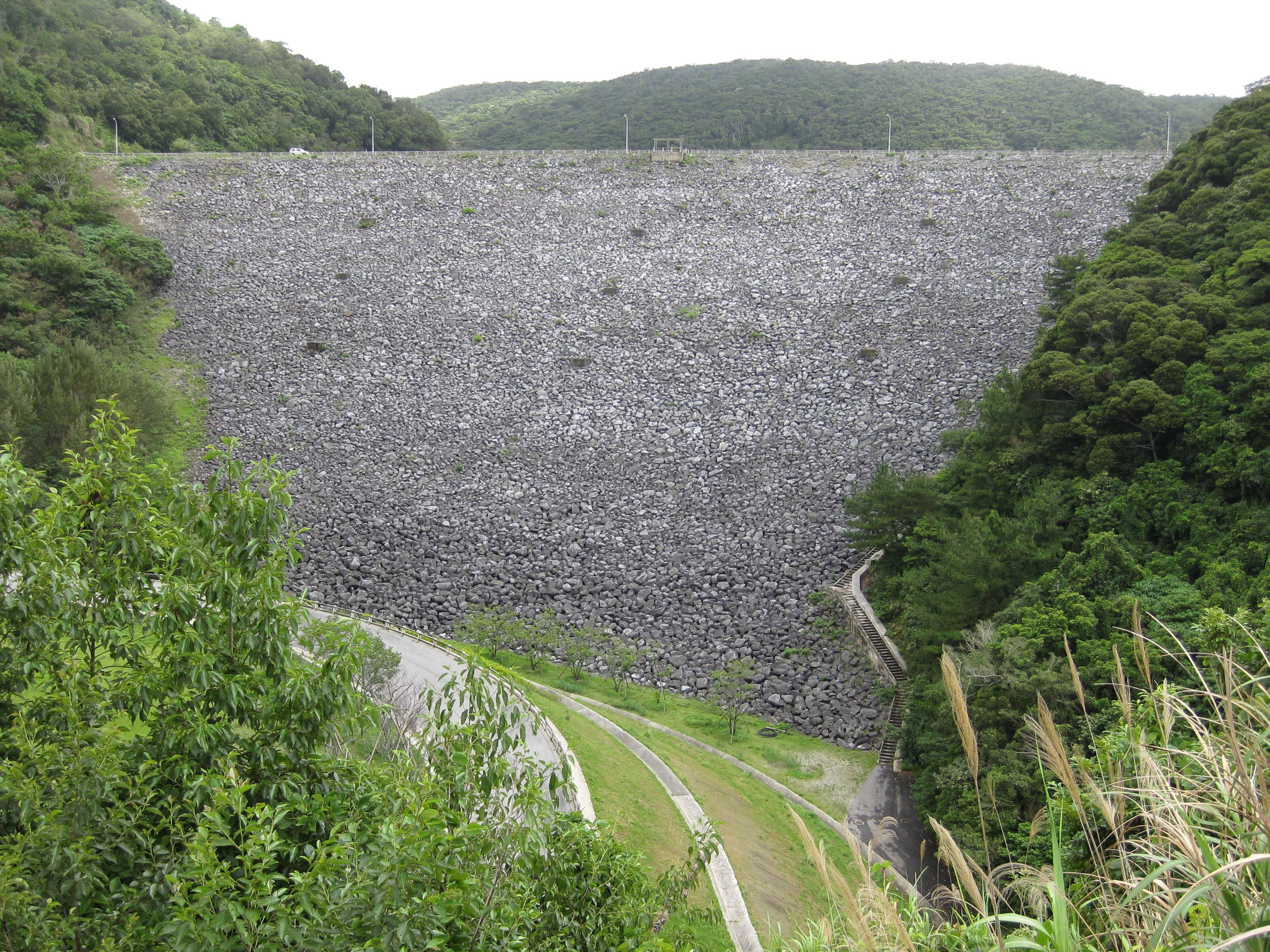
- Interactive map of Fukuji Dam
- Official name: 福地ダム
- Country: Japan
- Location: Higashi, Okinawa
- Coordinates: 26°38′51″N 128°10′27″E
- Status: Operational
- Construction began: 1969
- Opening date: 1974

Dam and spillways
- Type of dam: Embankment, rock-fill
- Impounds: Fukuchi River
- Height: 92 m (302 ft)
- Length: 260 m (853 ft)
- Elevation at crest: 90 m (295 ft)
- Dam volume: 1,622,000 m^{3} (2,121,496 cu yd)

Reservoir
- Total capacity: 55,000,000 m^{3} (44,589 acre⋅ft)
- Active capacity: 52,000,000 m^{3} (42,157 acre⋅ft)
- Catchment area: 32 km^{2} (12 sq mi)
- Surface area: 3 km^{2} (1 sq mi)

The Fukuji Dam (福地ダム) or Fukuchi Dam is a rock-fill embankment dam on the Fukuchi River 2.5 km (2 mi) northeast of Higashi, Okinawa Prefecture, Japan. The purpose of the dam, the tallest in Okinawa, is water supply and flood control.

== Background ==
Under the Ryukyu Domestic Water Corporation, the U.S. Army Corps of Engineers began constructing the dam in 1969. After the United States Civil Administration of the Ryukyu Islands returned administration of Okinawa back to Japan in 1972, construction became the responsibility of the Japanese government. The dam was completed in 1972, and the auxiliary spillway in December 1974. The dam was later raised to accommodate an improved intake and an additional 2.4 m (8 ft) in water elevation. This additional work was completed in 1991.

== Design ==
The dam is a 92 m (302 ft) tall and 260 m (853 ft) long rock-fill embankment type with a structural volume of 1,622,000 m^{3} (2,121,496 cu yd) and a crest elevation of 90 m (295 ft). The dam sits at the head of a 32 km^{2} (12 sq mi) catchment area and its reservoir has a surface area of 3 km^{2} (1 sq mi). The reservoir's capacity is 55,000,000 m^{3} (44,589 acre⋅ft) while 52,000,000 m^{3} (42,157 acre⋅ft) serves as active (or "useful") capacity. The dam is equipped with a drum gate-controlled chute spillway. On the eastern edge of the reservoir, 6.3 km (4 mi) east of the dam, there is an auxiliary spillway at 26°38′15″N 128°14′12″E. This spillway is a siphon-type and operates automatically to help drain the reservoir during flooding. It has a 900 m^{3}/s (31,783 cu ft/s) capacity and discharges directly into the Pacific Ocean.
