= Kanna Dam =

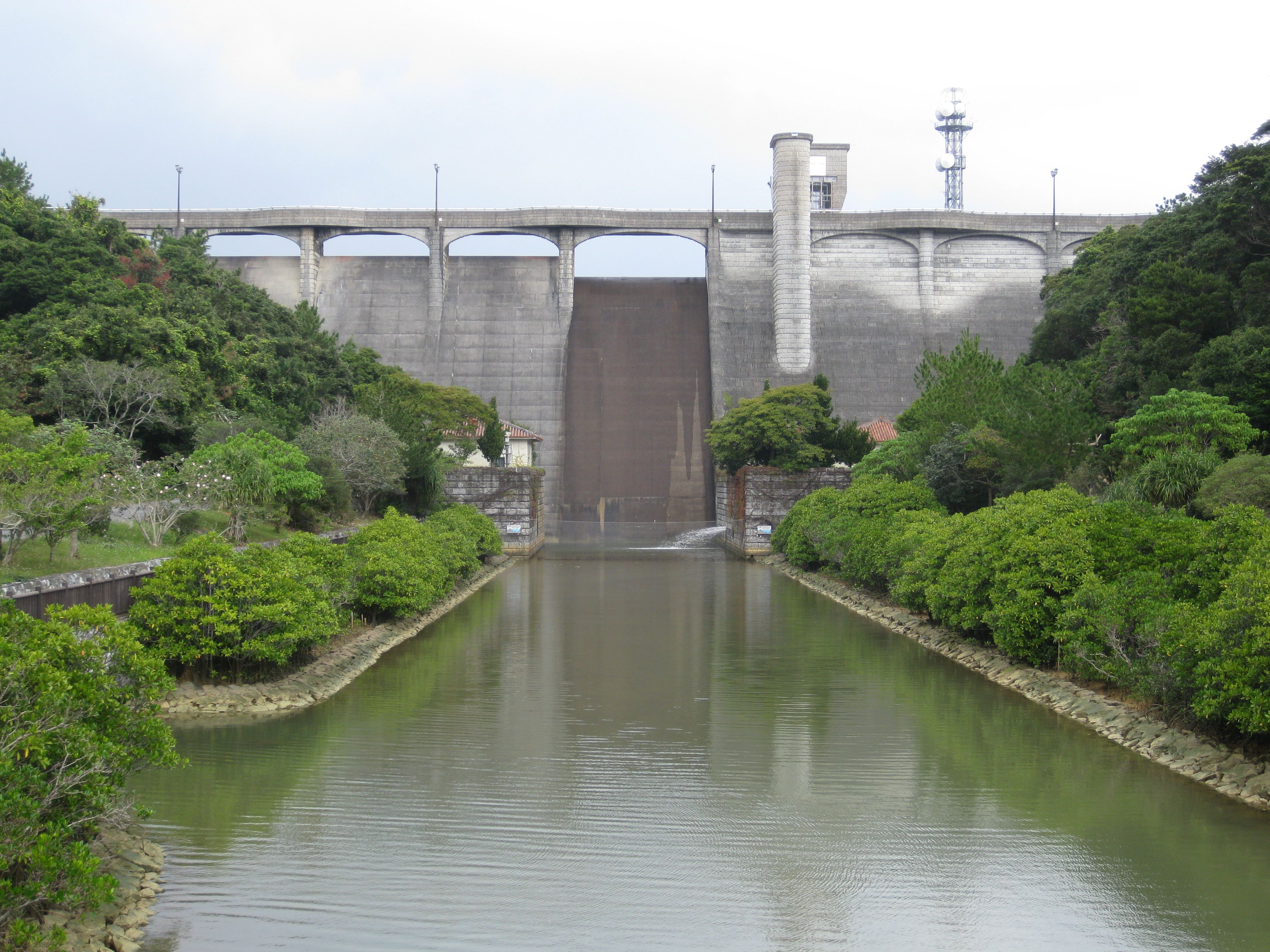
- Interactive map of Kanna Dam
- Official name: 漢那ダム
- Country: Japan
- Location: Ginoza, Okinawa
- Coordinates: 26°28′56″N 127°56′58″E
- Status: Operational
- Construction began: 1982
- Opening date: 1992

Dam and spillways
- Type of dam: Concrete gravity
- Impounds: Kanna River
- Height: 45 m (148 ft)
- Length: 185 m (607 ft)
- Elevation at crest: 33 m (108 ft)
- Dam volume: 72,000 m^{3} (94,172 cu yd)

Reservoir
- Total capacity: 8,200,000 m^{3} (6,648 acre⋅ft)
- Active capacity: 7,800,000 m^{3} (6,324 acre⋅ft)
- Catchment area: 8 km^{2} (3 sq mi)
- Surface area: 1 km^{2} (247 acres)

The Kanna Dam (漢那ダム) is a concrete gravity dam on the Kanna River in Ginoza, Okinawa Prefecture, Japan. The purpose of the dam is water supply and flood control. After studies were carried out in the 1970s(starting in 1973 and ending in 1978), construction on the dam began in 1982 and it was completed in 1992. The dam is 45 m (148 ft) tall and 185 m (607 ft) long. In order to retain the reservoir, a 37 m (121 ft) tall and 500 m (1,640 ft) long saddle dam was constructed directly northeast of the dam. A fish ladder was installed on the dam during construction to assist the migration of fish, shrimp and crabs. Mangroves downstream of the dam were restored after construction and the area is a tourist destination along with a habitat for water fowl.
