= Ushirozawa Tameike Dam =

Dam in Yamanashi Prefecture, Japan

Ushirozawa Tameike
- Location within Japan
- Location: Yamanashi Prefecture, Japan
- Coordinates: 35°42′09″N 138°31′12″E
- Opening date: 1939

Dam and spillways
- Height: 22.7 m (74 ft)
- Length: 115 m (377 ft)

Reservoir
- Total capacity: 213,000 m^{3} (7,500,000 cu ft)
- Catchment area: 0.5 km^{2} (0.19 sq mi)
- Surface area: 4 hectares (9.9 acres)

Ushirozawa Tameike is an earthfill dam located in Yamanashi Prefecture in Japan. The dam is used for irrigation. The catchment area of the dam is 0.5 km^{2}. The dam impounds about 4 ha of land when full and can store 213 thousand cubic meters of water. The construction of the dam was completed in 1939.
