= Hirose Dam =

Dam in Yamanashi Prefecture, Japan

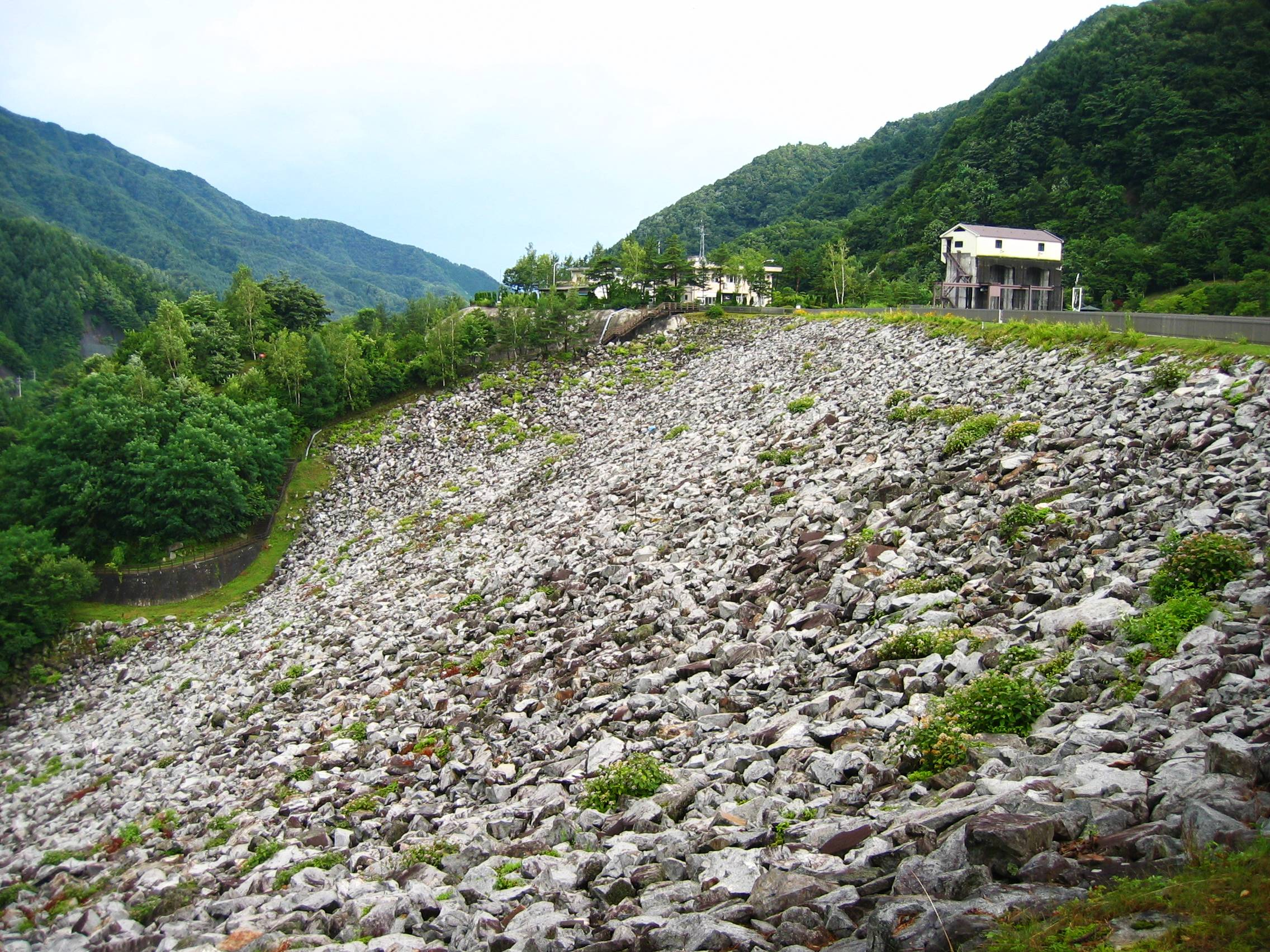

- Location within Japan
- Interactive map of Hirose Dam
- Location: Yamanashi Prefecture, Japan
- Coordinates: 35°50′22″N 138°45′49″E
- Construction began: 1965
- Opening date: 1974

Dam and spillways
- Height: 75 m (246 ft)
- Length: 255 m (837 ft)

Reservoir
- Total capacity: 14300 thousand cubic meters
- Catchment area: 76.6 sq. km
- Surface area: 55 hectares

Hirose Dam is a rockfill dam located in Yamanashi Prefecture in Japan. The dam is used for flood control, irrigation, water supply and power production. The catchment area of the dam is 76.6 km^{2}. The dam impounds about 55 ha of land when full and can store 14300 thousand cubic meters of water. The construction of the dam was started on 1965 and completed in 1974.
