= Kurashiki Dam =

Dam in Okinawa Prefecture, Japan

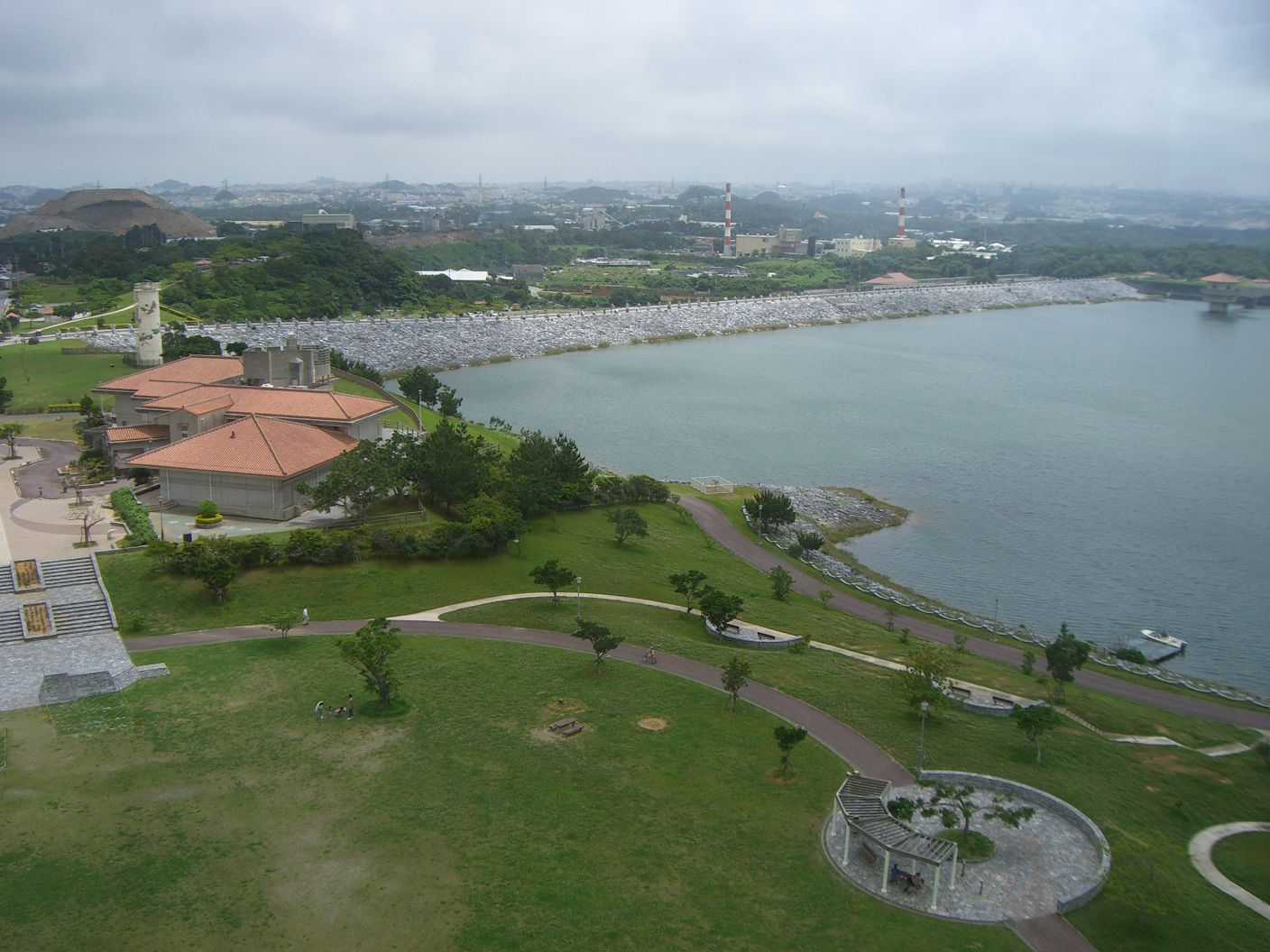
- Interactive map of Kurashiki Dam
- Location: Okinawa Prefecture, Japan
- Coordinates: 26°23′19″N 127°48′18″E
- Construction began: 1979
- Opening date: 1994

Dam and spillways
- Height: 33.5m
- Length: 441m

Reservoir
- Total capacity: 7100
- Catchment area: 104.7
- Surface area: 77 hectares

Kurashiki Dam is a rock-fill dam located in Okinawa prefecture in Japan. The dam is used for flood control and water supply. The catchment area of the dam is 104.7 km^{2}. The dam impounds about 77 ha of land when full and can store 7100 thousand cubic meters of water. The construction of the dam was started on 1979 and completed in 1994.
