= Kakimoto Dam =

Dam in Yamanashi Prefecture, Japan

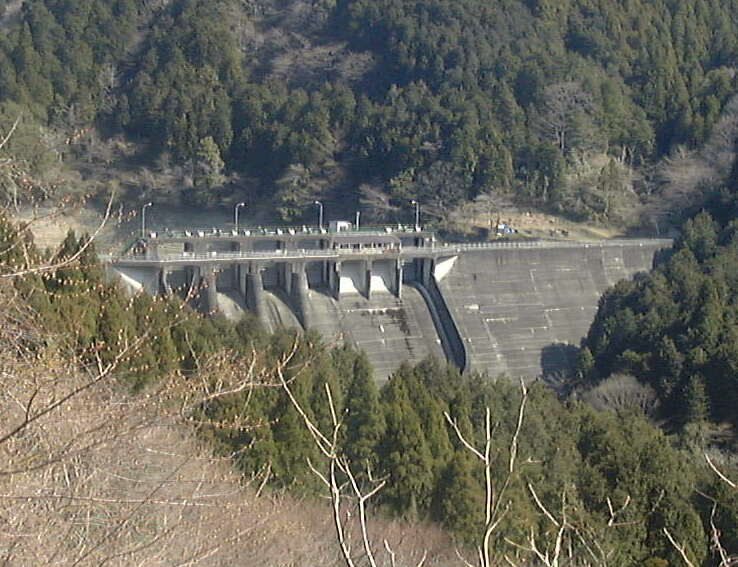

- Location within Japan
- Interactive map of Kakimoto Dam
- Location: Yamanashi Prefecture, Japan
- Coordinates: 35°16′38″N 138°31′00″E
- Opening date: 1952

Dam and spillways
- Height: 46.1 m (151 ft)
- Length: 215 m (705 ft)

Reservoir
- Total capacity: 7592 thousand cubic meters
- Catchment area: 33.6 sq. km
- Surface area: 42 hectares

Kakimoto Dam is a gravity dam located in Yamanashi Prefecture in Japan. The dam is used for power production. The catchment area of the dam is 33.6 km^{2}. The dam impounds about 42 ha of land when full and can store 7592 thousand cubic meters of water. The construction of the dam was completed in 1952.
