= Arakawa Dam (Okinawa) =

Dam in Okinawa Prefecture, Japan

- Interactive map of Arakawa Dam
- Location: Okinawa Prefecture, Japan
- Coordinates: 26°40′51″N 128°14′40″E
- Construction began: 1971
- Opening date: 1976

Dam and spillways
- Height: 44.5 m
- Length: 177 m

Reservoir
- Total capacity: 1.65 million m³
- Catchment area: 7.4 km^{2}
- Surface area: 16 hectares

Arakawa Dam is a concrete gravity dam located in Okinawa prefecture of Japan. The dam is used to collect drinking water for water supply, irrigation and flood control. The catchment area of the dam is 7.4 km^{2}. The dam impounds about 16 ha of land when full and can store 1.65 million cubic meters of water. The construction of the dam started on 1971 and completed in 1976.
