= Okukubi Dam =

Dam in Okinawa Prefecture, Japan

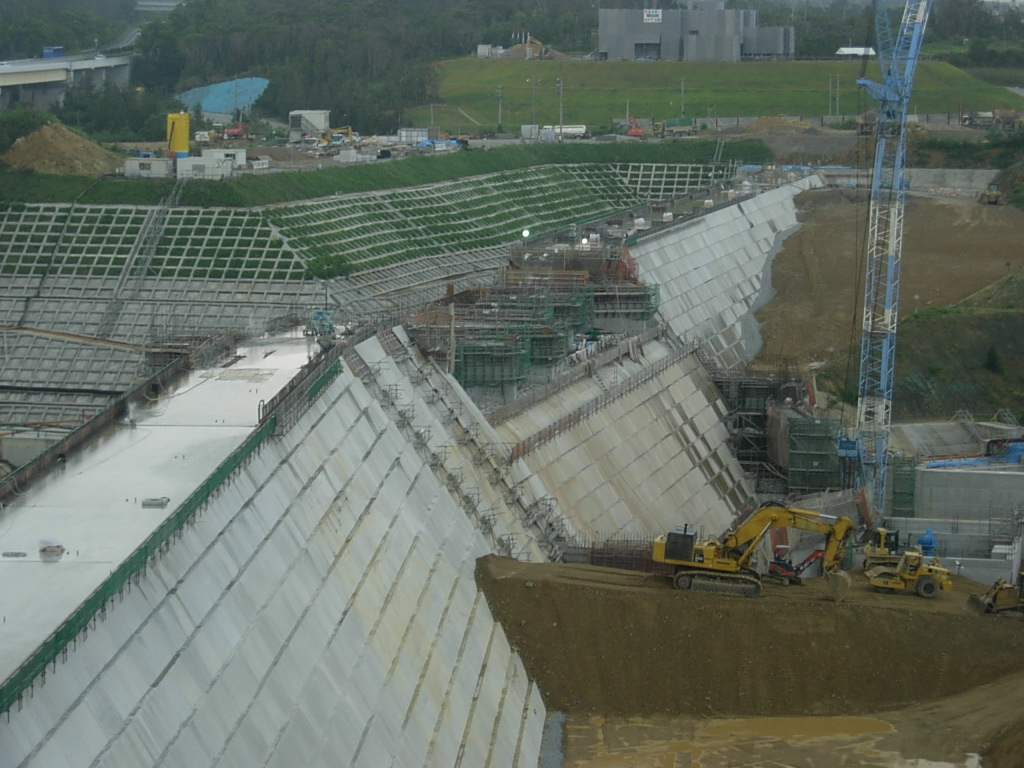
- Downstream face of the dam in July 2011
- Interactive map of Okukubi Dam
- Official name: 億首ダム
- Country: Japan
- Location: Kin, Okinawa
- Coordinates: 26°27′54″N 127°55′54″E
- Status: Operational
- Construction began: 2009
- Opening date: March 2013
- Construction cost: ¥3 billion (US$38.2 million)
- Owners: Development and Construction Department, Okinawa General Bureau

Dam and spillways
- Impounds: Okukubi River
- Height: 39 m (128 ft)
- Length: 462 m (1,516 ft)
- Elevation at crest: 29 m (95 ft)
- Dam volume: 339,000 m^{3} (443,395 cu yd)
- Spillway type: Labyrinth weir
- Spillway capacity: 430 m^{3}/s (15,185 cu ft/s)

Reservoir
- Total capacity: 8,560,000 m^{3} (6,940 acre⋅ft)
- Active capacity: 7,860,000 m^{3} (6,372 acre⋅ft)
- Catchment area: 14.6 km^{2} (6 sq mi)
- Surface area: 0.61 km^{2} (0 sq mi)

The Okukubi Dam (億首ダム) is a trapezoidal cemented, sand and gravel (CSG) dam on the Okukubi River in Kin, Okinawa Prefecture, Japan. Construction began in 2009 and its reservoir was filled by 31 March 2013. It is the first trapezoidal CSG-type to be constructed as a main dam in the world. Its purpose is to provide flood control and water for municipal use along with the irrigation of 70 ha (173 acres) of land.

== Background ==
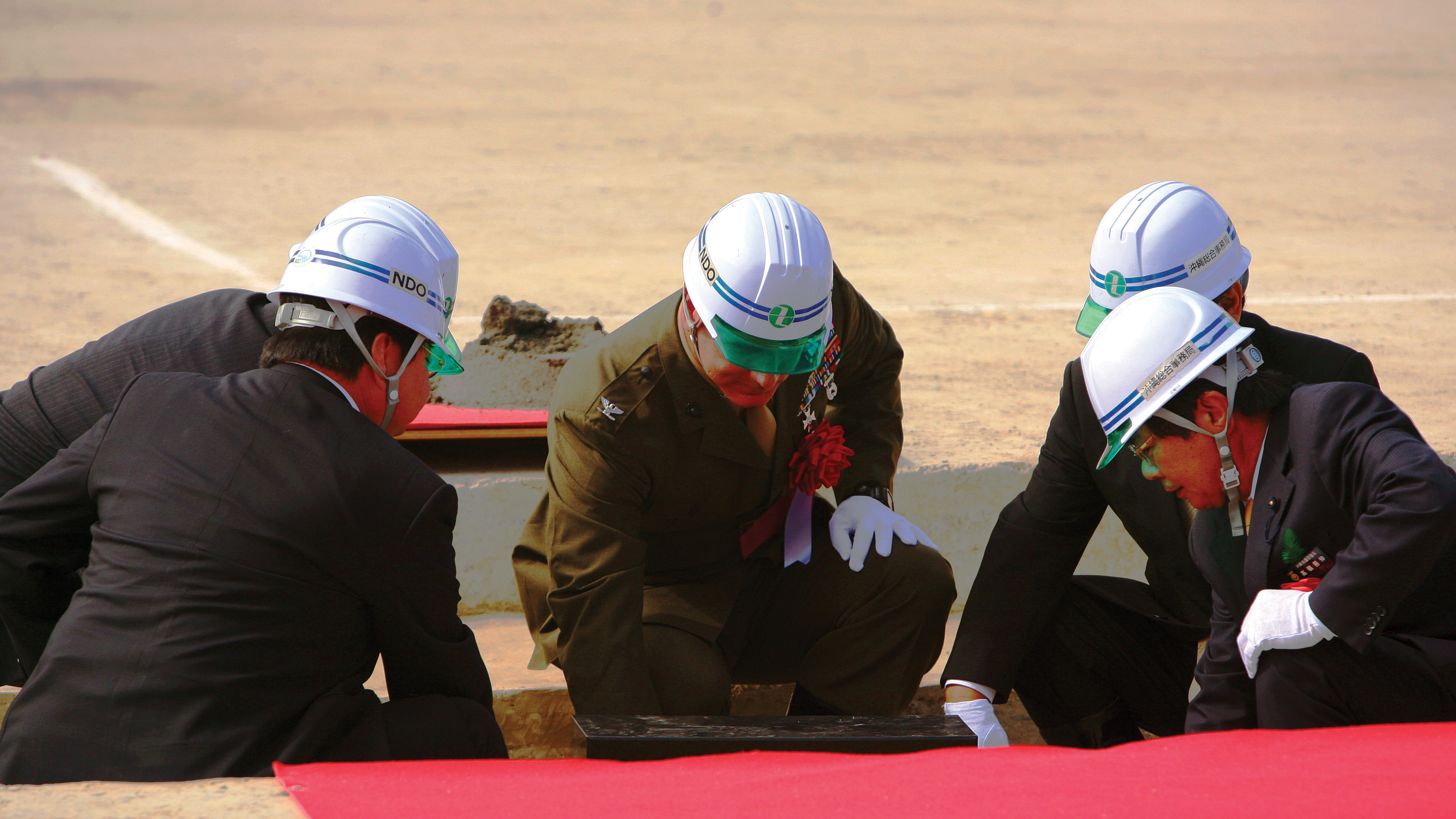
Officials laying the dam's cornerstone

Construction on the dam had originally begun in 1978. At that time, it was designed as a concrete gravity dam. Construction was halted soon after it began though. The dam was redesigned over the next few decades and after the new project was approved, preliminary construction for the dam began in late 2003. Principal construction began on March 24, 2009 and there was a groundbreaking ceremony on June 5, 2009. To divert the river, a cofferdam did not need to be constructed. The existing Kinmu Dam 100 m (328 ft) upstream was modified to divert the river on the left bank of the river. In May 2010, the river was diverted and by August of the same year, over 1,042,000 m^{3} (1,362,885 cu yd) of rock and stone had been excavated from the site. On February 26, 2011, a ceremony was held to bury the cornerstone of the dam prior to beginning the fill of the dam's body. It was attended by Japanese and U.S. officials (due to the dam's location within the U.S. Marine Central Training Area). It will cost ¥3 billion (US$38.2 million) and it was completed in March 2013.

== Design ==
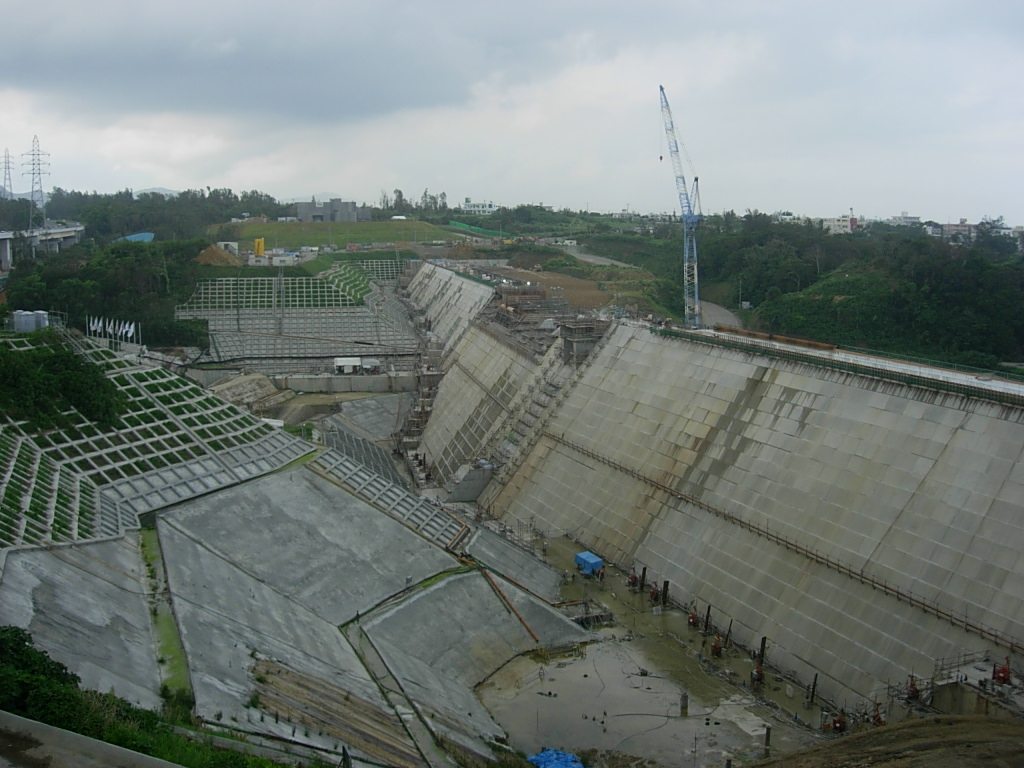
Upstream side of the dam

The dam is a 39 m-tall (128 ft) and 462 m (1,516 ft) long trapezoidal CSG-type with a structural volume of 339,000 m^{3} (443,395 cu yd). The cemented, sand and gravel (CSG) design is a mixture of a concrete gravity dam and an embankment dam. Essentially, it is a sand and gravel embankment coated in concrete. This design is cheaper because it uses less fill and concrete when compared to a gravity or embankment dam. Its wide base provides the required strength while the concrete coating seals the embankment and adds to its durability. The dam's crest lies at an elevation of 29 m (95 ft) and sits at the head of a 14.6 km^{2} (6 sq mi) catchment. The dam's main spillway is a labyrinth weir-type over its main crest. It has a design discharge capacity of 430 m^{3}/s (15,185 cu ft/s). The dam is equipped with an emergency spillway as well, which will have a capacity of 160 m^{3}/s (5,650 cu ft/s). It impounds a reservoir with a capacity of 8,560,000 m^{3} (6,940 acre⋅ft), of which 7,860,000 m^{3} (6,372 acre⋅ft) is active (or "useful") capacity. The reservoir's surface area is 0.61 km^{2} (0.24 sq mi).
