= Fukuzato Underground Dam =

Fukuzato Dam
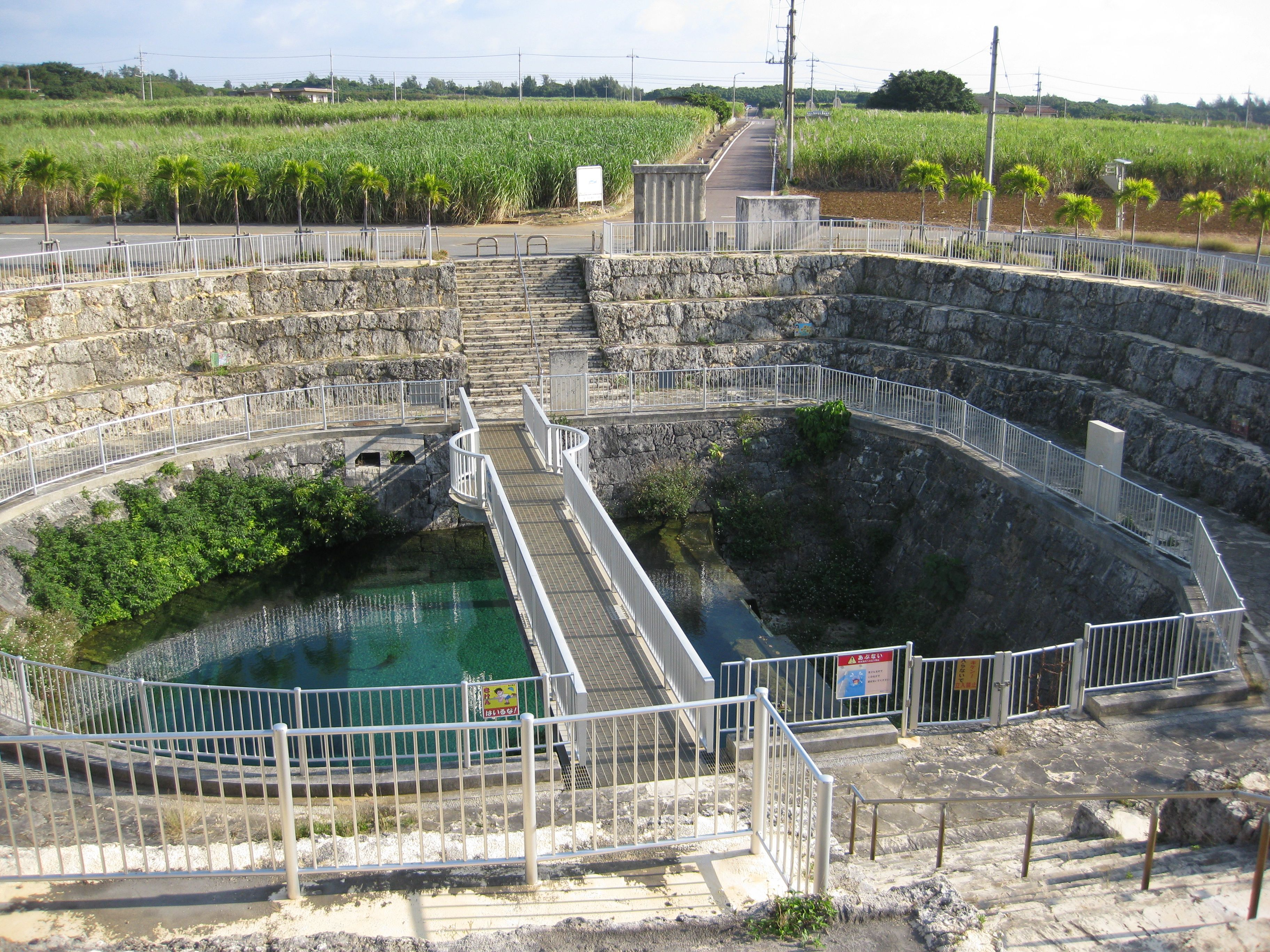

- Location within Japan
- Country: Japan
- Location: Miyakojima, Okinawa
- Coordinates: 24°44′10″N 125°23′50″E
- Status: Operational
- Construction began: 1988
- Opening date: 1998
- Owner: Midori Shigen Kodan (Nochi Seibi Kodan)

Dam and spillways
- Type of dam: Sub-surface
- Height: 27 m (89 ft) (side dams:21.0 m, 6.0 m)
- Length: 1,790.2 m (5,873 ft) (side dams:785.75 m, 331.50 m)

Reservoir
- Total capacity: 10,500,000 m^{3} (8,512 acre⋅ft)
- Active capacity: 7,600,000 m^{3} (6,161 acre⋅ft)

Fukuzato Dam (福里ダム, Fukuzato Damu) is an underground dam constructed in Miyakojima, Okinawa Prefecture. An underground dam is a wall constructed to save underground water from pouring into the sea so that it can be put to human use.

== Generals ==
Fukuzato Dam adjoins Sunakawa Underground Dam and experimental underground Minafuku Dam. An underground wall, 27 meters in height and 1790 meters in width stops incoming seawater and outgoing water within the island. The saved water is pumped up through 85 wells for use such as irrigation into the sugarcane fields. One of the good points of underground dams is that the areas above the dams are used as fields, sugarcane fields in Miyakojima and there is no sight of dam lakes.

== Geology ==
Miyakojima is covered with the limestone and beneath the layer is a water-resistant Shimajiri layer. There are 8 underground valleys along which underground water flows into the sea of the southern areas of the island. These valleys are indications for underground dams. The Minafuku Dam stops the underground water of the 3rd valley (from the east) and the Fukuzato Dam stops water of the 4th valley.

== Construction ==
Originally a main dam and three side dams were planned but later only two side dams were evaluated as necessary and constructed. The dam proper is situated more than 20 meters underground, and cannot be seen. For construction, a pile driver equipped with an auger drill first opens a hole, 60 cm in diameter at a distance of 90 cm, and between the holes, the auger drill forms a plate-formed cavity and concrete is poured into the cavity. Together with the Sunakawa Dam, an area of 8400 hectares of agricultural fields is well irrigated with these facilities.

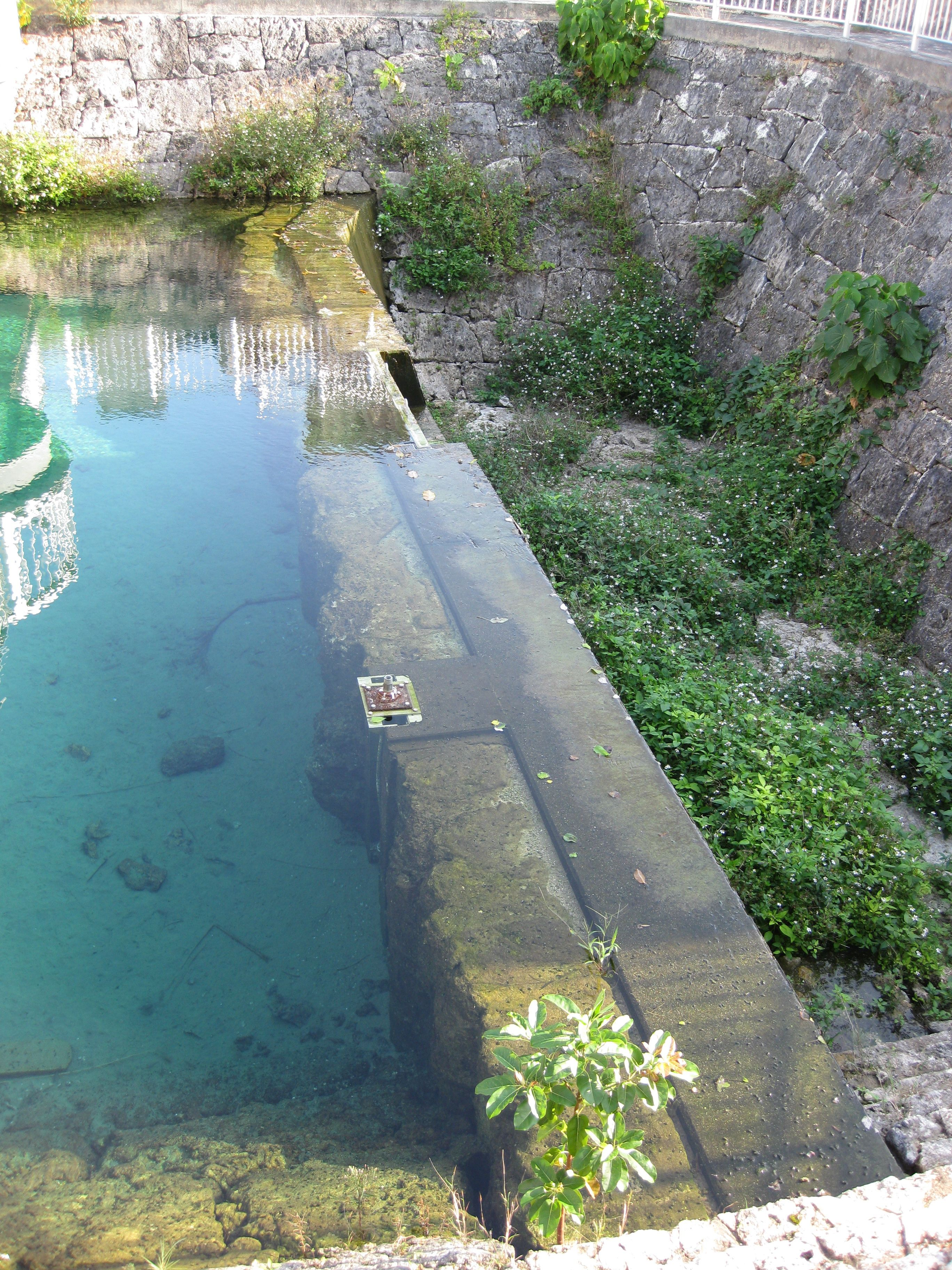
the wall of Fukuzato Dam strengthened at distal areas

== History ==
The geology of Miyakojima is characterized by unstable availability of water for sugarcane agriculture because of changeable rainfall and the lack of rivers. Especially a long drought of 1971 reduced the production of sugarcane to one fourths of the yearly production in Miyakojima. Therefore, the agricultural underwater was investigated and the project of underground dams started in 1974. In 1977, construction of an experimental dam, Minafuku Dam, was started. The experience with the auger in the 1980s Fukuoka Underground Rail construction, helped with the construction of the Miyakojima underground dam. Planning was done between 1984 and 1986 and the construction of the Fukuzato Dam started in 1988 as a national project and the main dam was completed on July 24, 1996 and the side dams were completed on December 18, 1998. By these facilities, agriculture in Miyakojima flourished with sugarcane, tobacco, pumpkins and other vegetables.

== Miyakojima Underground Dam Museum ==
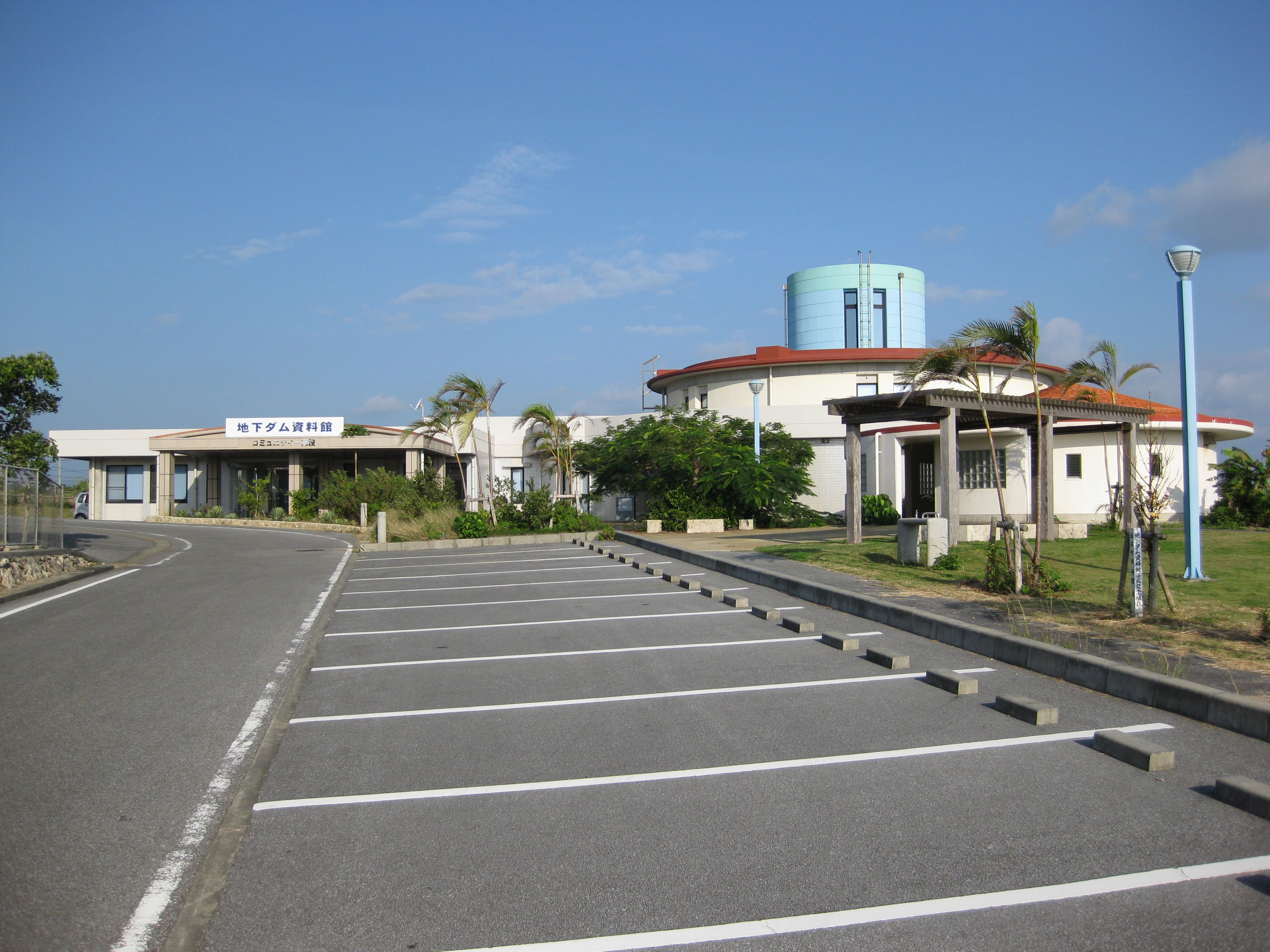
Underground Dam Museum

In 2013, Miyakojima Underground Dam Museum was completed near the Fukuzato Underground Dam. The geology, agriculture, the model of the dam, the 3-axis auger drill used are demonstrated. The entrance fee is 85-69 yen.
