= Zusazawa Dam =

Dam in Yamanashi Prefecture, Japan

- Location within Japan
- Location: Yamanashi Prefecture, Japan
- Coordinates: 35°49′28″N 138°19′55″E
- Construction began: 1925
- Opening date: 1926

Dam and spillways
- Height: 21.5 m (71 ft)
- Length: 75.8 m (249 ft)

Reservoir
- Total capacity: 45,000 m^{3} (1,600,000 cu ft)
- Catchment area: 178 km^{2} (69 sq mi)
- Surface area: 1 hectare (2.5 acres)

Zusazawa Dam is a gravity dam located in Yamanashi Prefecture in Japan. The dam is used for power production. The catchment area of the dam is 178 km^{2}. The dam impounds about 1 ha of land when full and can store 45 thousand cubic meters of water. The construction of the dam was started on 1925 and completed in 1926.
