= Ryuga-ike Dam =

Dam in Yamanashi Prefecture, Japan

Ryuga-ike
- Location within Japan
- Location: Yamanashi Prefecture, Japan
- Coordinates: 35°41′15″N 138°34′47″E
- Opening date: 1956

Dam and spillways
- Height: 17 m (56 ft)
- Length: 382 m (1,253 ft)

Reservoir
- Total capacity: 264,000 m^{3} (9,300,000 cu ft)
- Catchment area: sq. km
- Surface area: 3 hectares (7.4 acres)

Ryuga-ike is an earthfill dam located in Yamanashi Prefecture in Japan. The dam is used for irrigation. The catchment area of the dam is km^{2}. The dam impounds about 3 ha of land when full and can store 264 thousand cubic meters of water. The construction of the dam was completed in 1956.
