= Ohno Dam (Hokkaido) =

Dam in Hokkaido Prefecture, Japan

- Location within Japan
- Location: Hokkaido Prefecture, Japan
- Coordinates: 41°57′27″N 140°30′46″E
- Construction began: 1990
- Opening date: 2002

Dam and spillways
- Height: 47.5 m (156 ft)
- Length: 160 m (520 ft)

Reservoir
- Total capacity: 1,600,000 m^{3} (57,000,000 cu ft)
- Catchment area: 5.4 km^{2} (2.1 sq mi)
- Surface area: 12 hectares (30 acres)

Ohno Dam (Japanese: 大野ダム) is a gravity dam located in Hokkaido Prefecture in Japan. The dam is used for irrigation and water supply with catchment area of 5.4 km^{2}. The dam impounds about 12 ha of land when full and can store 1600 thousand cubic meters of water. The construction of the dam was started on 1990 and completed in 2002.
