= Daimon Dam =

Dam in Yamanashi Prefecture, Japan

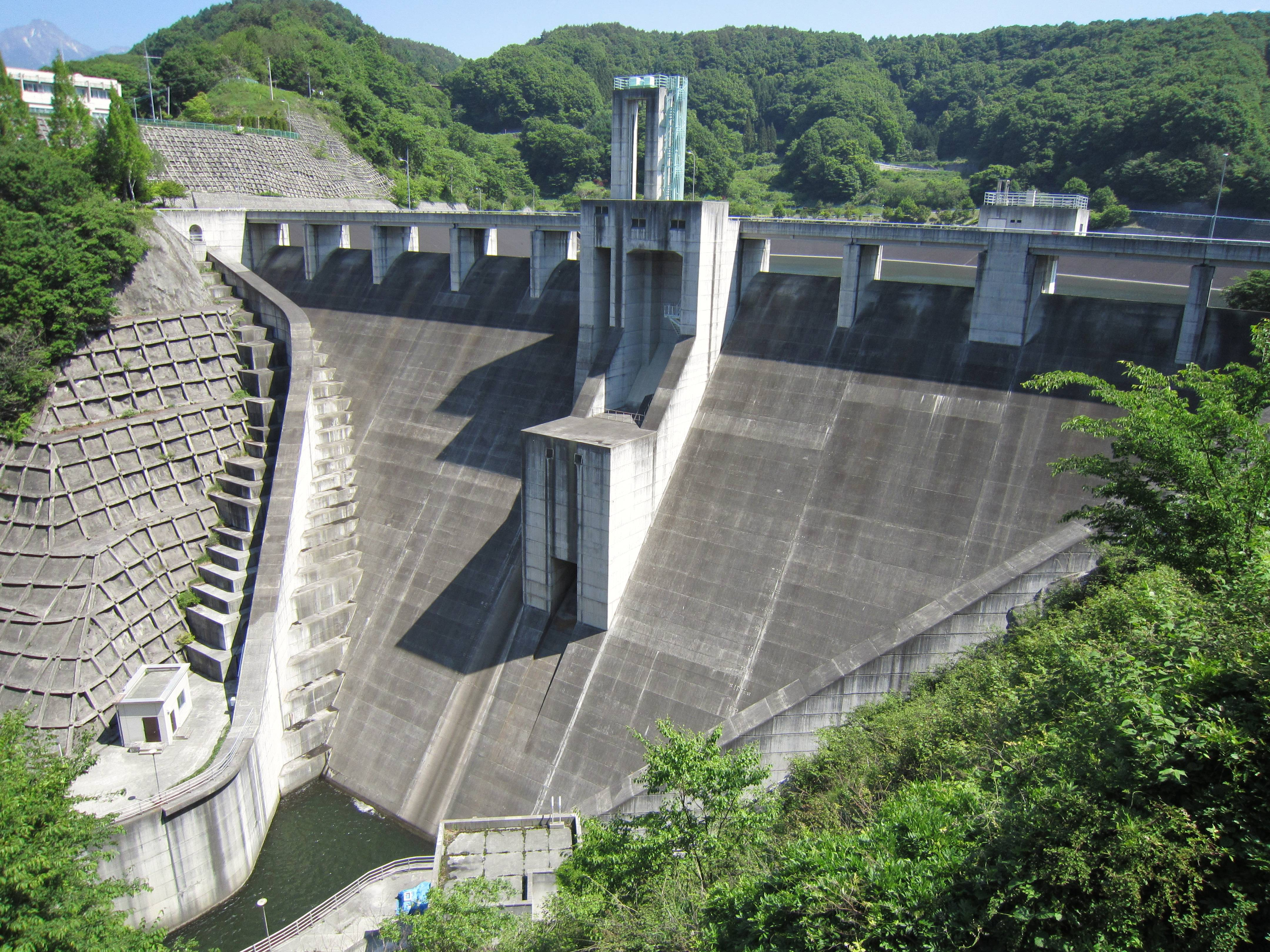

- Location within Japan
- Interactive map of Daimon Dam
- Location: Yamanashi Prefecture, Japan
- Coordinates: 35°52′29″N 138°26′03″E
- Construction began: 1968
- Opening date: 1987

Dam and spillways
- Height: 65.5 m (215 ft)
- Length: 180 m (590 ft)

Reservoir
- Total capacity: 3600 thousand cubic meters
- Catchment area: 51.7 sq. km
- Surface area: 19 hectares

Daimon Dam is a gravity dam located in Yamanashi Prefecture in Japan. The dam is used for flood control, water supply and power production. The catchment area of the dam is 51.7 km^{2}. The dam impounds about 19 ha of land when full and can store 3600 thousand cubic meters of water. The construction of the dam was started on 1968 and completed in 1987.
