= Sokobaru dam =

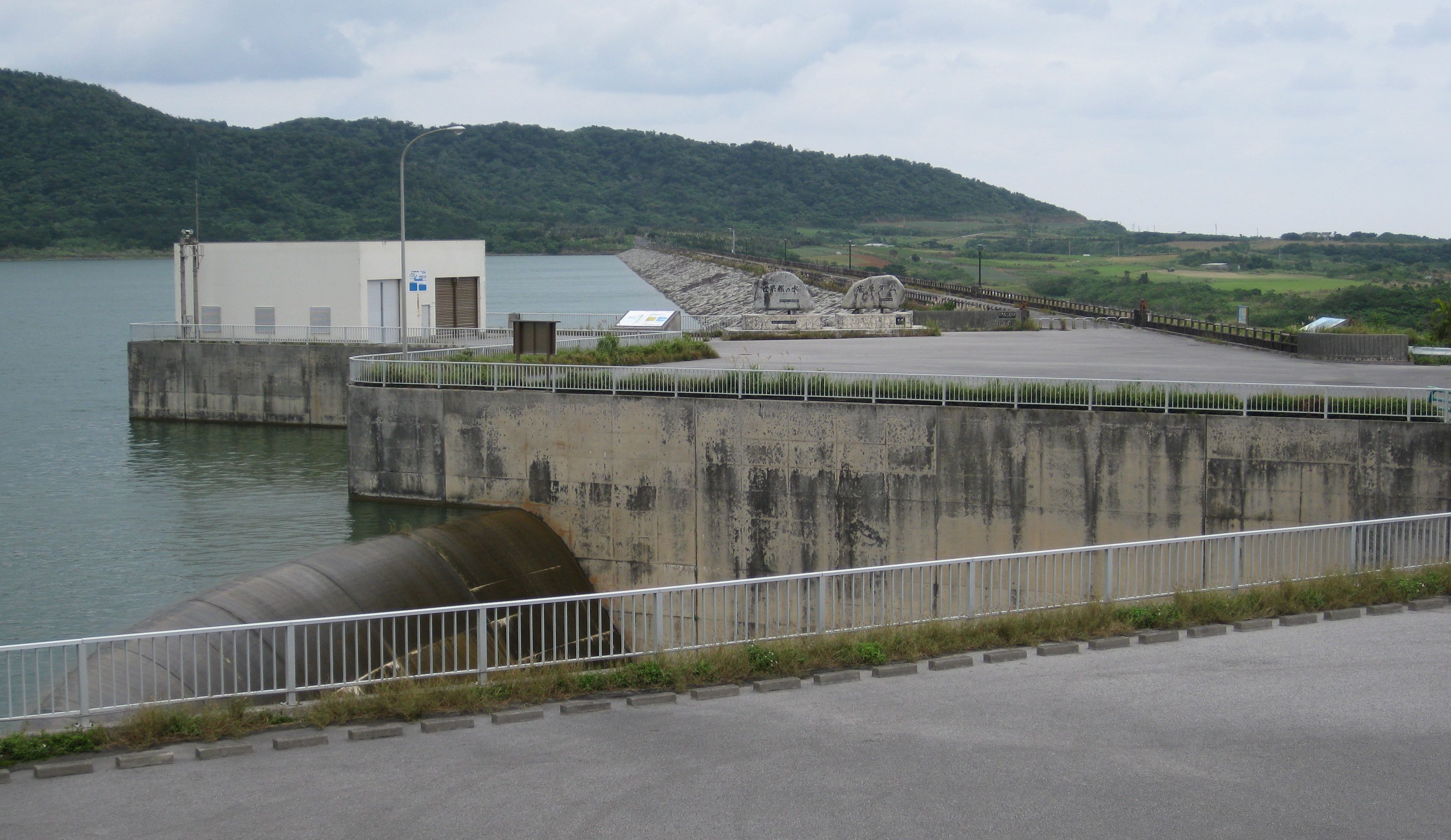
- Interactive map of Sokobaru dam
- Location: Ishigaki, Okinawa, Japan
- Coordinates: 24.4225°N 124.2218°E
- Status: Operational

Sokubara dam (Japanese:底原ダム) is a man-made dam located in Ishigaki Island, Okinawa prefecture of southern Japan. The dam is used to collect water for drinking purpose. The dam lies in the catchment of Miyara River. The dam came in operation in 1992 and has a capacity of 130Mm^{3}.
