= Maruyama Tameike Dam =

Dam in Yamanashi Prefecture, Japan

Maruyama Tameike
- Location within Japan
- Location: Yamanashi Prefecture, Japan
- Coordinates: 35°42′20″N 138°33′14″E
- Opening date: 1988

Dam and spillways
- Height: 19 m (62 ft)
- Length: 89 m (292 ft)

Reservoir
- Total capacity: 1450 thousand cubic meters
- Catchment area: 4.1 sq. km
- Surface area: 26 hectares

Maruyama Tameike is an earthfill dam located in Yamanashi Prefecture in Japan. The dam is used for flood control and irrigation. The catchment area of the dam is 4.1 km^{2}. The dam impounds about 26 ha of land when full and can store 1450 thousand cubic meters of water. The construction of the dam was completed in 1988.
