= Shiokawa Dam =

Dam in Yamanashi Prefecture, Japan

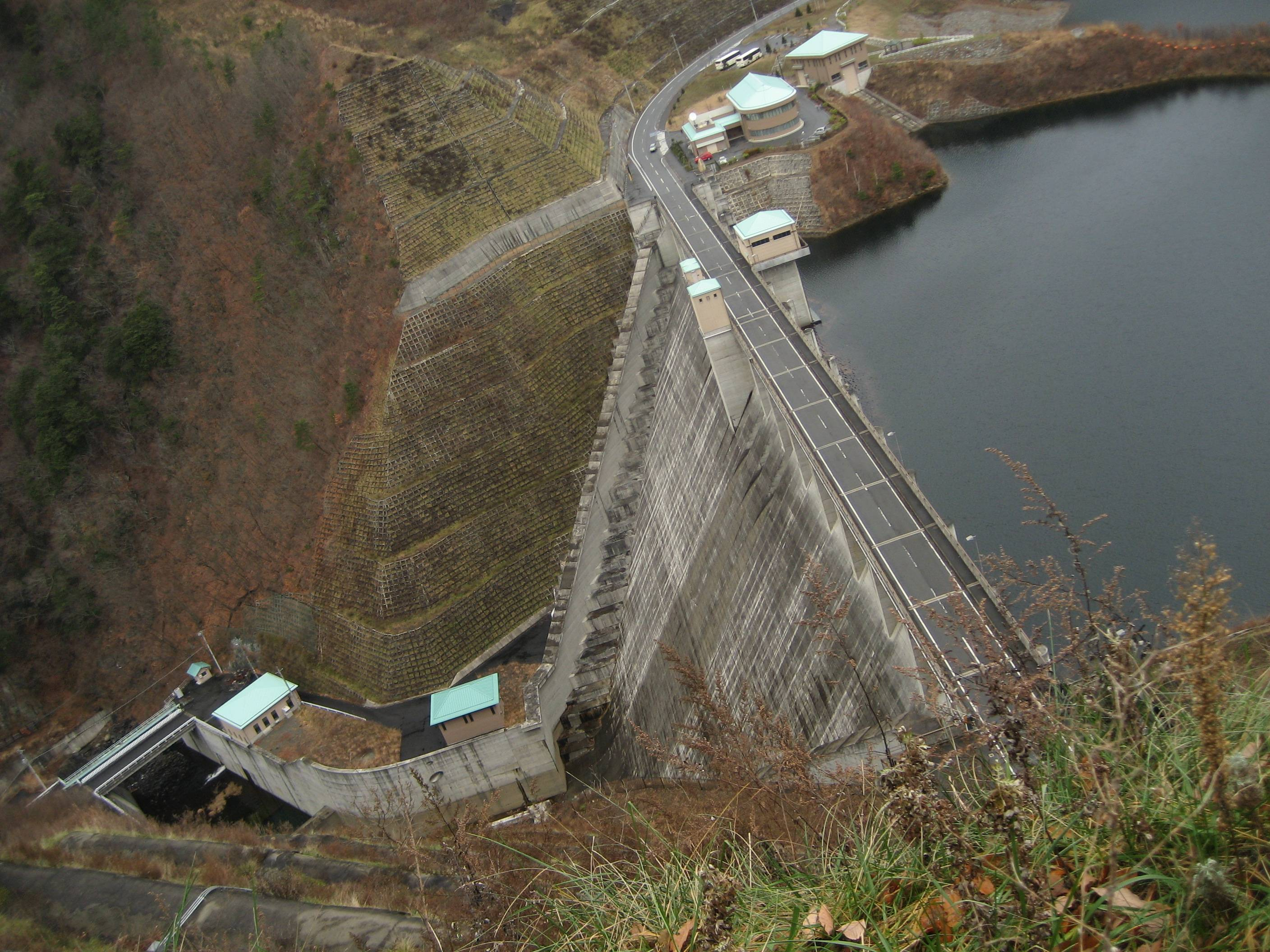

- Location within Japan
- Location: Yamanashi Prefecture, Japan
- Coordinates: 35°51′30″N 138°29′52″E
- Construction began: 1975
- Opening date: 1997

Dam and spillways
- Height: 79 m (259 ft)
- Length: 225 m (738 ft)

Reservoir
- Total capacity: 11,500,000 m^{3} (410,000,000 cu ft)
- Catchment area: 85.3 km^{2} (32.9 sq mi)
- Surface area: 48 hectares (120 acres)

Shiokawa Dam is a gravity dam located in Yamanashi Prefecture in Japan. The dam is used for flood control, irrigation and water supply. The catchment area of the dam is 85.3 km^{2}. The dam impounds about 48 ha of land when full and can store 11500 thousand cubic meters of water. The construction of the dam was started on 1975 and completed in 1997.
