= Amahata Dam =

Dam in Yamanashi Prefecture, Japan

- Location within Japan
- Interactive map of Amahata Dam
- Location: Yamanashi Prefecture, Japan
- Coordinates: 35°24′31″N 138°19′54″E
- Opening date: 1967

Dam and spillways
- Height: 80.5 m (264 ft)
- Length: 147.6 m (484 ft)

Reservoir
- Total capacity: 11000 thousand cubic meters
- Catchment area: 99.7 sq. km
- Surface area: 59 hectares

Amahata Dam is a 80.5m high arch dam located on the Fuji River in Yamanashi Prefecture, Japan. The dam is used for power production and was completed in 1967.

== Specifications ==
The Amahata Dam is a 147.6m (156.2 ft) long and 80.5m (264.1 ft) high concrete arch dam. The dam withholds a reservoir which has a total capacity of 11,000,000 m^{3} (14,387,457 cu yd), the same amount of which is live (active storage). The catchment area of the dam is 99.7 km^{2} (38.49 sq mi) and has a surface area of 59 ha, or 0.59 km^{2} (0.228 sq mi).
