= Nishiyama Dam (Yamanashi) =

Dam in Yamanashi Prefecture, Japan

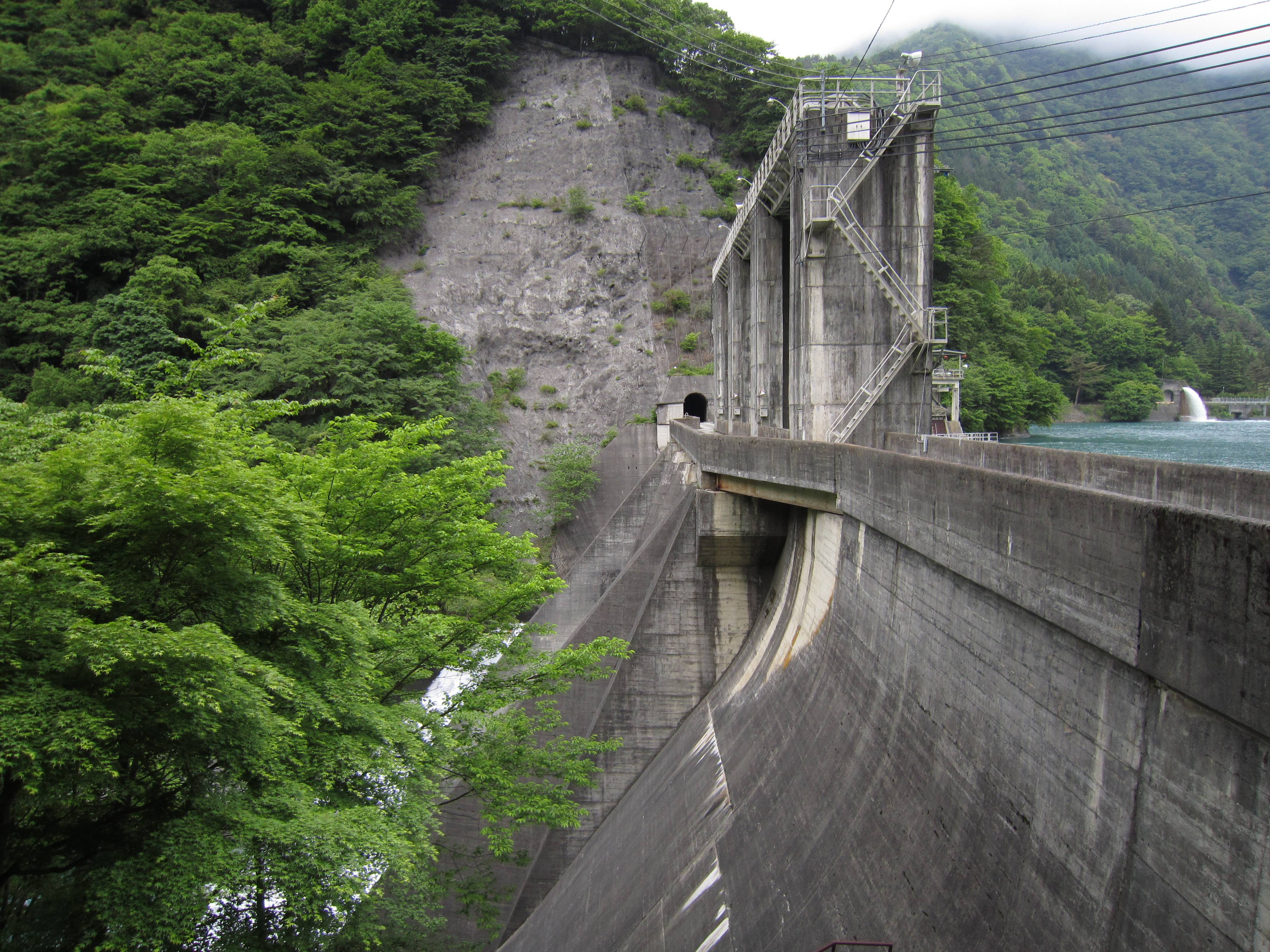

- Location within Japan
- Location: Yamanashi Prefecture, Japan
- Coordinates: 35°34′11″N 138°17′59″E
- Construction began: 1954
- Opening date: 1957

Dam and spillways
- Height: 40.6 m (133 ft)
- Length: 112.3 m (368 ft)

Reservoir
- Total capacity: 2,382,000 m^{3} (84,100,000 cu ft)
- Catchment area: 192 km^{2} (74 sq mi)
- Surface area: 24 hectares (59 acres)

Nishiyama Dam is a gravity dam located in Yamanashi Prefecture in Japan. The dam is used for power production. The catchment area of the dam is 192 km^{2}. The dam impounds about 24 ha of land when full and can store 2382 thousand cubic meters of water. The construction of the dam was started on 1954 and completed in 1957.
