= Haneji Dam =

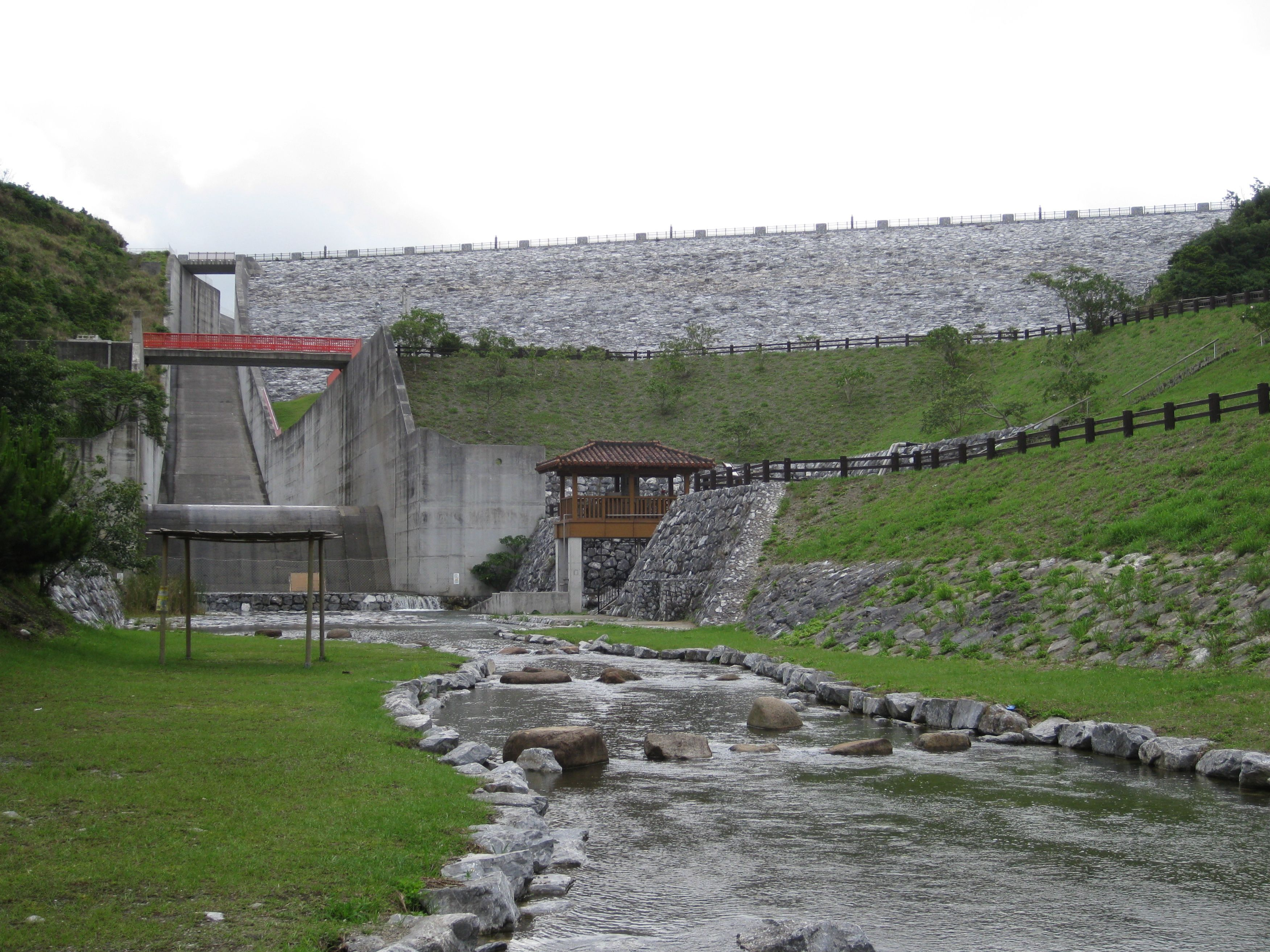
- Interactive map of Haneji Dam
- Official name: 羽地ダム
- Country: Japan
- Coordinates: 26°36′26″N 128°01′19″E
- Status: Operational
- Construction began: 1981
- Opening date: 2004
- Owner: Okinawa General Bureau

Dam and spillways
- Type of dam: Embankment, rock-fill
- Height: 67 m (220 ft)
- Length: 198 m (650 ft)
- Elevation at crest: 74 m (243 ft)
- Dam volume: 1,050,000 m^{3} (1,373,348 cu yd)

Reservoir
- Total capacity: 19,800,000 m^{3} (16,052 acre⋅ft)
- Active capacity: 19,200,000 m^{3} (15,566 acre⋅ft)
- Catchment area: 11 km^{2} (4 sq mi)
- Surface area: 1 km^{2} (247 acres)

The Haneji Dam (羽地ダム) is a rock-fill embankment dam on the Haneji River in Nago, Okinawa Prefecture, Japan. The purpose of the dam is flood control and water supply.

== History ==
Planning for the dam was conducted in the late 1960s by the U.S. Army Corps of Engineers and construction on the dam began in 1981. Construction on the river diversion tunnels commenced in 1993 and work on the dam's body began in 1998. The body of the dam was complete in 2000 and the entire project in 2004.

== Design ==
The dam is a 67 m (220 ft) tall and 198 m (650 ft) long rock-fill embankment type with a structural volume of 1,050,000 m^{3} (1,373,348 cu yd) and a crest elevation of 74 m (243 ft). The dam sits at the head of an 11 km^{2} (4 sq mi) catchment area and its reservoir has a surface area of 1 km^{2} (247 acres). The reservoir's capacity is 19,800,000 m^{3} (16,052 acre⋅ft) while 19,200,000 m^{3} (15,566 acre⋅ft) serves as active (or "useful") capacity. The dam is equipped with an uncontrolled chute spillway.

=== Innovations ===
The dam and its facilities are equipped with several innovations to improve water quality and the environment. Water in the reservoir is aerated using a dam energy-air system. Water discharged from the dam powers two small turbines which provide electricity for the operation of shallow and deep aerators. Given the height of the dam, a traditional fish ladder was not viable. An airlift system was developed which transfers fish through tubes in and out of the reservoir. The radial gate that controls the intake was split and reversed in design. This design takes advantage of tensile strength instead of compression strength which allows for a more compact and less costly design.
