= Arakawa Dam (Yamanashi) =

Dam in Yamanashi Prefecture, Japan

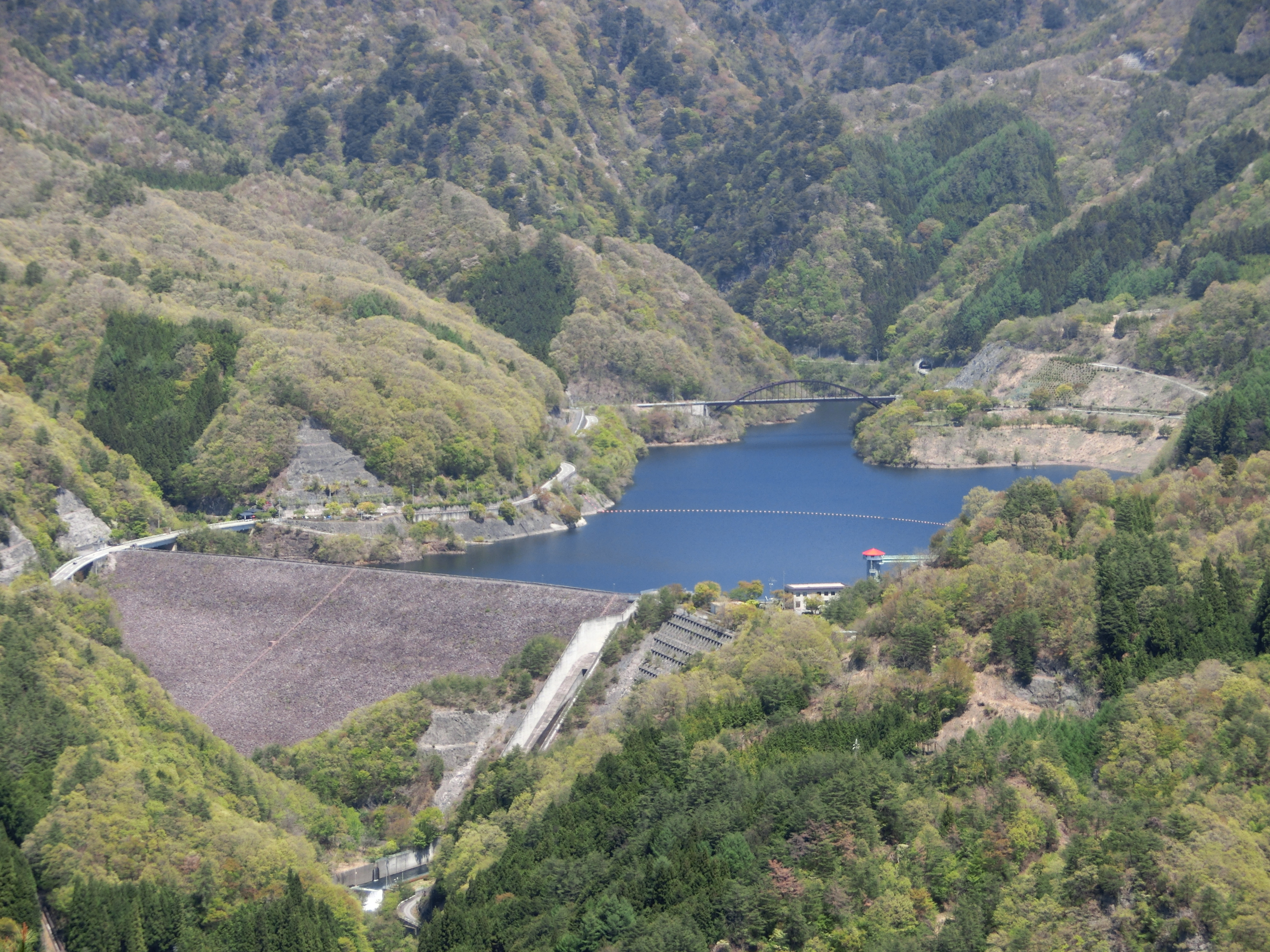

- Location within Japan
- Interactive map of Arakawa Dam
- Location: Yamanashi Prefecture, Japan
- Coordinates: 35°45′38″N 138°34′09″E
- Construction began: 1973
- Opening date: 1985

Dam and spillways
- Height: 88 m (289 ft)
- Length: 320 m (1,050 ft)

Reservoir
- Total capacity: 10800 thousand cubic meters
- Catchment area: 126.4 sq. km
- Surface area: 41 hectares

Arakawa Dam is a rockfill dam located in Yamanashi Prefecture in Japan. The dam is used for flood control and water supply. The catchment area of the dam is 126.4 km^{2}. The dam impounds about 41 ha of land when full and can store 10800 thousand cubic meters of water. The construction of the dam was started on 1973 and completed in 1985.
