= List of dams in Chiba Prefecture =

The following is a list of dams in Chiba Prefecture, Japan.

== List ==
Name	Location	Started	Opened	Height	Length	Image	DiJ number
Arakine Dam		1970	1978	33.5 m (110 ft)	302 m (991 ft)		0671
Awa Chuo Dam			1972	32 m (105 ft)	110 m (360 ft)		0667
Azuma No.1 Dam		1973	1976	22 m (72 ft)	175 m (574 ft)		0672
Azuma No.2 Dam		1979	1984	21 m (69 ft)	115 m (377 ft)		0685
Bodai Dam		1983	1998	41 m (135 ft)	198 m (650 ft)		0688
Daiyatsugawa Dam		1971	1973	25.5 m (84 ft)	50 m (160 ft)		2992
No.1 Fukurogura Dam			1923	22 m (72 ft)	60 m (200 ft)		3608
No.2 Fukurogura Dam		1970	1971	24.3 m (80 ft)	54 m (177 ft)		2991
Gundari Dam			2006	15.1 m (50 ft)	106.2 m (348 ft)		0651
Haccho-zeki Dam			1933	18 m (59 ft)	80 m (260 ft)		0653
Hirasawa Dam		1986	1998	25.6 m (84 ft)	159 m (522 ft)		2976
Hirota-zeki Dam			1928	16.7 m (55 ft)	57 m (187 ft)		0648
Ichinosawa-zeki Dam			1951	19 m (62 ft)	84.5 m (277 ft)		0658
Kameyama Dam		1969	1980	34.5 m (113 ft)	156 m (512 ft)		0676
Kanayama Dam			1962	28.3 m (93 ft)	110 m (360 ft)		0661
Katakura Dam		1974	2000	42.7 m (140 ft)	154 m (505 ft)		0682
Katsuura Dam		1966	1975	29 m (95 ft)	231.2 m (759 ft)		0668
Kori Dam		Dec 1972					
Komukai Dam		1972	1975	37 m (121 ft)	106 m (348 ft)		0670
Konaka-ike Dam			1947	18.9 m (62 ft)	241.8 m (793 ft)		0656
Kuramochi Dam		1967	1968	17.5 m (57 ft)	61.7 m (202 ft)		3410
Masuma Dam		1966	1969	34 m (112 ft)	145 m (476 ft)		0665
Matsube Dam		1975	1976	21.2 m (70 ft)	85 m (279 ft)		2990
Misaki Dam		1985	1989	23.7 m (78 ft)	128.9 m (423 ft)		3609
Mishima Dam			1955	25.3 m (83 ft)	127.7 m (419 ft)		0662
Motona Dam		1978	1979	28.2 m (93 ft)	69 m (226 ft)		0687
Nagara Dam		1966	1993	52 m (171 ft)	250 m (820 ft)		0679
Nakuma Dam		1974	1979	18.5 m (61 ft)	119 m (390 ft)		0673
Nakaozawa-zeki Dam		1934	1938	15.3 m (50 ft)	71 m (233 ft)		0652
Nokogiriyama Dam		1960	1962	19.1 m (63 ft)	55 m (180 ft)		0686
Nyu-zeki Dam			1940	16.4 m (54 ft)	40 m (130 ft)		0654
Okubo Dam		1972	1981	29.5 m (97 ft)	140 m (460 ft)		0677
No.2 Okuyatsu Dam		1987	1989	22.7 m (74 ft)	52.5 m (172 ft)		3345
Onjuku Dam		1970	1977	23.5 m (77 ft)	151 m (495 ft)		0675
Daiyatsugawa Dam		1971	1973	25.5 m (84 ft)	50 m (160 ft)		2992
Ozawa Dam		1989	1992	23.9 m (78 ft)	83.5 m (274 ft)		3606
Sakuma Dam		1976	1986	25.5 m (84 ft)	186 m (610 ft)		0680
Sakuna Dam		1971	1977	24.5 m (80 ft)	145 m (476 ft)		0674
Sankyo Seki Dam			1939	15.4 m (51 ft)	40 m (130 ft)		3607
Shirahama Dam		1963	1966	18.5 m (61 ft)	62.3 m (204 ft)		2993
Shiraishi Dam		1954	1958	19.5 m (64 ft)	100.5 m (330 ft)		0660
Takataki Dam		Apr 1990	1990	24.5 m (80 ft)	379 m (1,243 ft)		0681
Takinozeki Dam		1930	1937	18 m (59 ft)	104 m (341 ft)		3411
Togane Dam		1970	1995	28.3 m (93 ft)	248 m (814 ft)		0678
Toyofusa Dam		1967	Apr 1969	38 m (125 ft)			0664
Tozurahara Dam		1970	1978	31.5 m (103 ft)	115 m (377 ft)		0669
Uryu-ko Dam			1951	15 m (49 ft)	110 m (360 ft)		0657
Yamada Tameike Dam			1922	16 m (52 ft)			0646
Yamakura Dam		1959	1964	23 m (75 ft)			0663
Yamauchi Dam		1997	2004	21.6 m (71 ft)	99.8 m (327 ft)		3293
Yanagawa Dam		1999	1998	29.3 m (96 ft)	284 m (932 ft)		3035

== See also ==
- Media related to Dams in Chiba prefecture at Wikimedia Commons
