= Kanayama Dam =

Kanayama Dam may refer to:

- Kanayama Dam (Chiba)
- Kanayama Dam (Hokkaido)
