= Azuma Dam =

Azuma Dam may refer to:

- Azuma Dam (Chiba)
- Azuma Dam (Hokkaido)
