= Ozawa Dam =

Ozawa Dam may refer to:

- Ozawa Dam (Chiba)
- Ozawa Dam (Hokkaido)
