= Yanagawa Dam =

Yanagawa Dam may refer to:

- Yanagawa Dam (Chiba)
- Yanagawa Dam (Iwate)
