= Nagara Dam =

Nagara Dam may refer to:

- Nagara Dam (Kagawa)
- Nagara Dam (Chiba)
