= Haccho-zeki Dam =

Dam in Chiba Prefecture, Japan

Haccho-zeki
- Location within Japan
- Interactive map of Haccho-zeki
- Location: Chiba Prefecture, Japan
- Coordinates: 35°6′54″N 140°0′25″E
- Opening date: 1933

Dam and spillways
- Height: 18 m (59 ft)
- Length: 80 m (260 ft)

Reservoir
- Total capacity: 151 thousand cubic meters
- Surface area: 2 hectares

Haccho-zeki is an earthfill dam located in Chiba Prefecture in Japan. The dam is used for irrigation. The dam impounds about 2 ha of land when full and can store 151 thousand cubic meters of water. The construction of the dam was completed in 1933.
