= Tozurahara Dam =

Dam in Chiba Prefecture, Japan

- Location within Japan
- Location: Chiba Prefecture, Japan
- Coordinates: 35°10′43″N 139°57′34″E
- Construction began: 1970
- Opening date: 1978

Dam and spillways
- Height: 31.5 m (103 ft)
- Length: 115 m (377 ft)

Reservoir
- Total capacity: 4,350,000 m^{3} (154,000,000 cu ft)
- Catchment area: 15 km^{2} (5.8 sq mi)
- Surface area: 45 hectares (110 acres)

Tozurahara Dam is an earthfill dam located in Chiba Prefecture in Japan. The dam is used for irrigation. The catchment area of the dam is 15 km^{2}. The dam impounds about 45 ha of land when full and can store 4350 thousand cubic meters of water. The construction of the dam was started on 1970 and completed in 1978.
