= No.1 Fukurogura Dam =

Dam in Chiba Prefecture, Japan

- Location within Japan
- Location: Chiba Prefecture, Japan
- Coordinates: 35°8′33″N 140°7′46″E
- Opening date: 1923

Dam and spillways
- Height: 22 m (72 ft)
- Length: 60 m (200 ft)

Reservoir
- Total capacity: 157,000 m^{3} (5,500,000 cu ft)
- Catchment area: 0.6 km^{2} (0.23 sq mi)
- Surface area: 2 hectares (4.9 acres)

No.1 Fukurogura Dam is an earthfill dam located in Chiba Prefecture in Japan. The dam is used for irrigation and water supply. The catchment area of the dam is 0.6 km^{2}. The dam impounds about 2 ha of land when full and can store 157 thousand cubic meters of water. The construction of the dam was completed in 1923.
