= Ozawa Dam (Hokkaido) =

Dam in Hokkaido Prefecture, Japan

- Location within Japan
- Location: Hokkaido Prefecture, Japan
- Coordinates: 43°49′36″N 142°37′51″E
- Construction began: 1973
- Opening date: 1994

Dam and spillways
- Height: 25.4 m (83 ft)
- Length: 300 m (980 ft)

Reservoir
- Total capacity: 740,000 m^{3} (26,000,000 cu ft)
- Catchment area: 12.2 km^{2} (4.7 sq mi)
- Surface area: 12 hectares (30 acres)

Ozawa Dam (Japanese: 小沢ダム) is a rockfill dam located in Hokkaido Prefecture in Japan. The dam is used for flood control. The catchment area of the dam is 12.2 km^{2}. The dam impounds about 12 ha of land when full and can store 740 thousand cubic meters of water. The construction of the dam was started on 1973 and completed in 1994.
