= Nokogiriyama Dam =

Dam in Chiba Prefecture, Japan

- Location within Japan
- Location: Chiba Prefecture, Japan
- Coordinates: 35°9′10″N 139°50′46″E
- Construction began: 1960
- Opening date: 1962

Dam and spillways
- Height: 19.1 m (63 ft)
- Length: 55 m (180 ft)

Reservoir
- Total capacity: 147,000 m^{3} (5,200,000 cu ft)
- Catchment area: 2.5 km^{2} (0.97 sq mi)
- Surface area: 2 hectares (4.9 acres)

Nokogiriyama Dam is a gravity dam located in Chiba Prefecture in Japan. The dam is used for water supply. The catchment area of the dam is 2.5 km^{2}. The dam impounds about 2 ha of land when full and can store 147 thousand cubic meters of water. The construction of the dam was started on 1960 and completed in 1962.
