= Komukai Dam =

Dam in Chiba Prefecture, Japan

- Location within Japan
- Location: Chiba Prefecture, Japan
- Coordinates: 35°3′57″N 139°59′50″E
- Construction began: 1972
- Opening date: 1975

Dam and spillways
- Height: 37 m (121 ft)
- Length: 106 m (348 ft)

Reservoir
- Total capacity: 950 thousand cubic meters
- Catchment area: 11.3 sq. km
- Surface area: 10 hectares

Komukai Dam is a gravity dam located in Chiba Prefecture in Japan. The dam is used for water supply. The catchment area of the dam is 11.3 km^{2}. The dam impounds about 10 ha of land when full and can store 950 thousand cubic meters of water. The construction of the dam was started on 1972 and completed in 1975.
