= Shirahama Dam =

Dam in Chiba Prefecture, Japan

- Location within Japan
- Location: Chiba Prefecture, Japan
- Coordinates: 34°55′49″N 139°53′44″E
- Construction began: 1963
- Opening date: 1966

Dam and spillways
- Height: 18.5 m (61 ft)
- Length: 62.3 m (204 ft)

Reservoir
- Total capacity: 230,000 m^{3} (8,100,000 cu ft)
- Catchment area: 1.6 km^{2} (0.62 sq mi)
- Surface area: 1 hectare (2.5 acres)

Shirahama Dam is a gravity dam located in Chiba Prefecture in Japan. The dam is used for water supply. The catchment area of the dam is 1.6 km^{2}. The dam impounds about 1 ha of land when full and can store 230 thousand cubic meters of water. The construction of the dam was started on 1963 and completed in 1966.
