= Azuma Dam (Chiba) =

Dam in Chiba Prefecture, Japan

- Location within Japan
- Interactive map of Azuma Dam
- Location: Chiba Prefecture, Japan
- Coordinates: 35°14′11″N 140°18′27″E
- Construction began: 1973
- Opening date: 1976

Dam and spillways
- Height: 22 m (72 ft)
- Length: 175 m (574 ft)

Reservoir
- Total capacity: 450 thousand cubic meters
- Catchment area: 5.2 sq. km
- Surface area: 9 hectares

Azuma Dam is an earthfill dam located in Chiba Prefecture in Japan. The dam is used for water supply. The catchment area of the dam is 5.2 km^{2}. The dam impounds about 9 ha of land when full and can store 450 thousand cubic meters of water. The construction of the dam was started on 1973 and completed in 1976.
