= Sankyo Seki Dam =

Dam in Chiba Prefecture, Japan

- Location within Japan
- Location: Chiba Prefecture, Japan
- Coordinates: 35°4′27″N 140°3′45″E
- Opening date: 1939

Dam and spillways
- Height: 15.4 m (51 ft)
- Length: 40 m (130 ft)

Reservoir
- Total capacity: 14,000 m^{3} (490,000 cu ft)
- Catchment area: 0.2 km^{2} (0.077 sq mi)
- Surface area: hectares

Sankyo Seki Dam is an earthfill dam located in Chiba Prefecture in Japan. The dam is used for irrigation. The catchment area of the dam is 0.2 km^{2}. The dam can store 14 thousand cubic meters of water. The construction of the dam was completed in 1939.
