= Misaki Dam =

Dam in Chiba Prefecture, Japan

- Location within Japan
- Location: Chiba Prefecture, Japan
- Coordinates: 35°16′59″N 140°21′23″E
- Construction began: 1985
- Opening date: 1989

Dam and spillways
- Height: 23.7 m (78 ft)
- Length: 128.9 m (423 ft)

Reservoir
- Total capacity: 541 thousand cubic meters
- Catchment area: 0.8 sq. km
- Surface area: 8 hectares

Misaki Dam is an earthfill dam located in Chiba Prefecture in Japan. The dam is used for water supply. The catchment area of the dam is 0.8 km^{2}. The dam impounds about 8 ha of land when full and can store 541 thousand cubic meters of water. The construction of the dam was started on 1985 and completed in 1989.
