= Katsuura Dam =

Dam in Chiba Prefecture, Japan

- Location within Japan
- Interactive map of Katsuura Dam
- Location: Chiba Prefecture, Japan
- Coordinates: 35°10′15″N 140°12′18″E
- Construction began: 1966
- Opening date: 1975

Dam and spillways
- Height: 29 m (95 ft)
- Length: 231.2 m (759 ft)

Reservoir
- Total capacity: 1966 thousand cubic meters
- Catchment area: 1 sq. km
- Surface area: 20 hectares

Katsuura Dam is an earthfill dam located in Chiba Prefecture in Japan. The dam is used for irrigation. The catchment area of the dam is 1 km^{2}. The dam impounds about 20 ha of land when full and can store 1966 thousand cubic meters of water. The construction of the dam was started on 1966 and completed in 1975.
