= Nagara Dam (Chiba) =

Dam in Chiba Prefecture, Japan

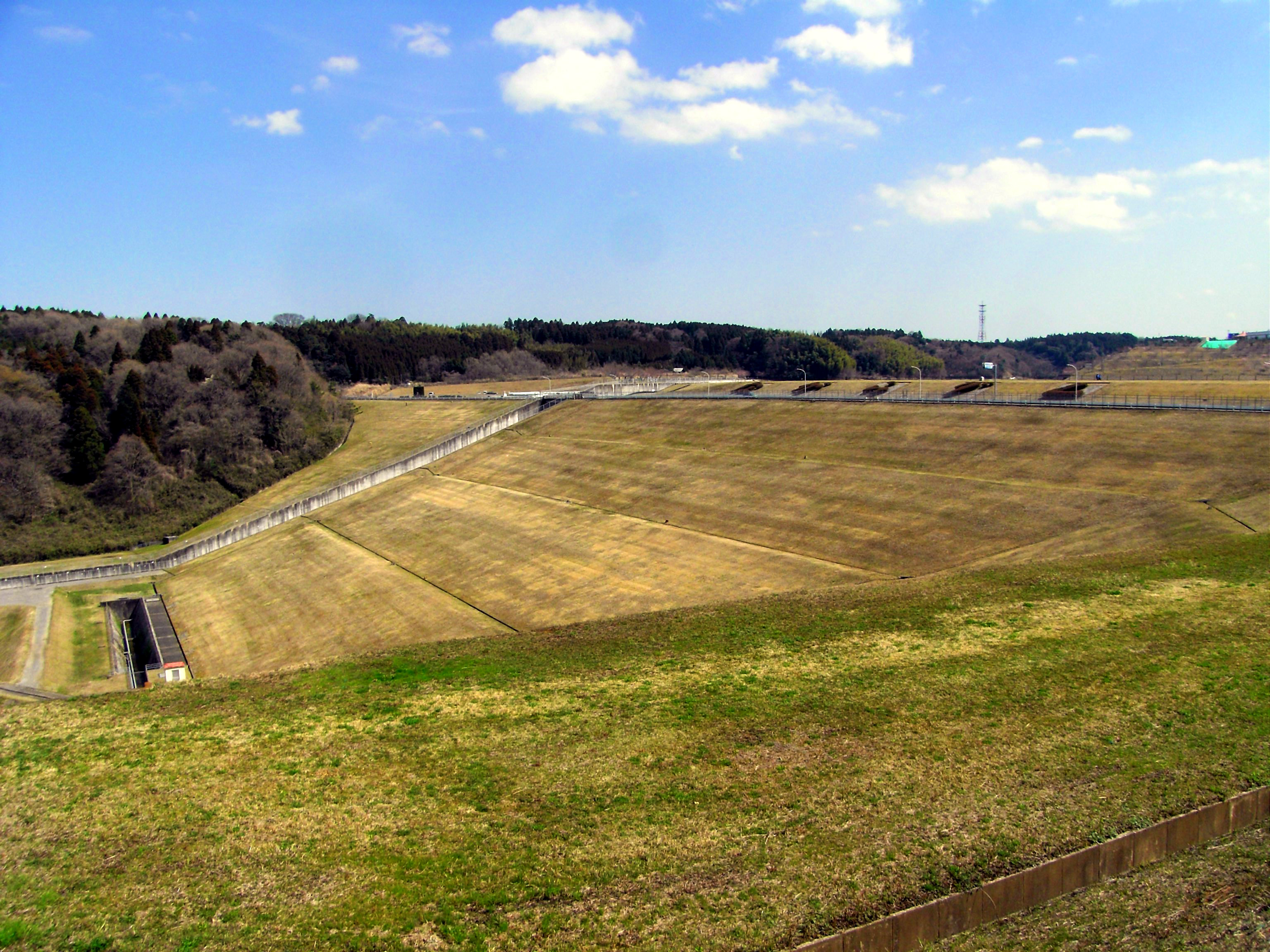

- Location within Japan
- Location: Chiba Prefecture, Japan
- Coordinates: 35°28′36″N 140°12′06″E
- Construction began: 1966
- Opening date: 1993

Dam and spillways
- Height: 52 m (171 ft)
- Length: 250 m (820 ft)

Reservoir
- Total capacity: 10000 thousand cubic meters
- Catchment area: 3.4 sq. km
- Surface area: 81 hectares

Nagara Dam is an earthfill dam located in Chiba Prefecture in Japan. The dam is used for water supply. The catchment area of the dam is 3.4 km^{2}. The dam impounds about 81 ha of land when full and can store 10000 thousand cubic meters of water. The construction of the dam was started on 1966 and completed in 1993.
