= Togane Dam =

Dam in Chiba Prefecture, Japan

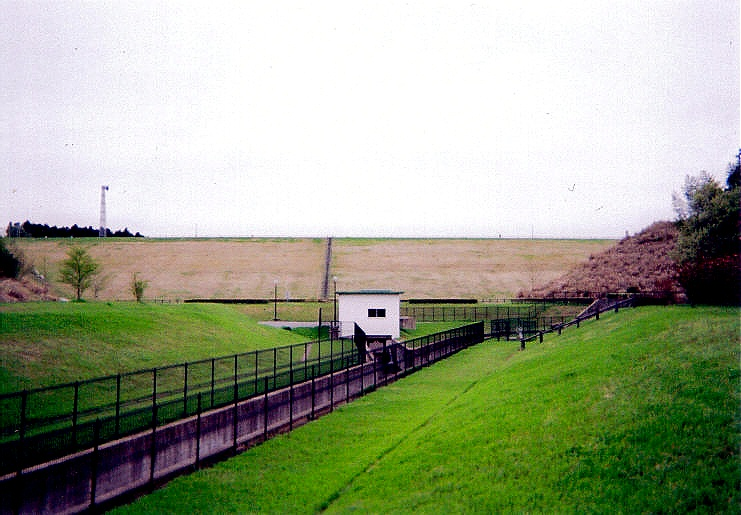

- Location within Japan
- Location: Chiba Prefecture, Japan
- Coordinates: 35°34′53″N 140°21′21″E
- Construction began: 1970
- Opening date: 1995

Dam and spillways
- Height: 28.3 m (93 ft)
- Length: 248 m (814 ft)

Reservoir
- Total capacity: 2,300,000 m^{3} (81,000,000 cu ft)
- Catchment area: 0.6 km^{2} (0.23 sq mi)
- Surface area: 25 hectares (62 acres)

Togane Dam is an earthfill dam located in Chiba Prefecture in Japan. The dam is used for water supply. The catchment area of the dam is 0.6 km^{2}. The dam impounds about 25 ha of land when full and can store 2300 thousand cubic meters of water. The construction of the dam was started on 1970 and completed in 1995.
