= Nakaozawa-zeki Dam =

Dam in Chiba Prefecture, Japan

Nakaozawa-zeki
- Location within Japan
- Location: Chiba Prefecture, Japan
- Coordinates: 35°2′54″N 139°52′08″E
- Construction began: 1934
- Opening date: 1938

Dam and spillways
- Height: 15.3 m (50 ft)
- Length: 71 m (233 ft)

Reservoir
- Total capacity: 137 thousand cubic meters
- Catchment area: 0.9 sq. km
- Surface area: 3 hectares

Nakaozawa-zeki is an earthfill dam located in Chiba Prefecture in Japan. The dam is used for irrigation. The catchment area of the dam is 0.9 km^{2}. The dam impounds about 3 ha of land when full and can store 137 thousand cubic meters of water. The construction of the dam was started on 1934 and completed in 1938.
