= Yamauchi Dam =

Dam in Chiba Prefecture, Japan

- Location within Japan
- Location: Chiba Prefecture, Japan
- Coordinates: 35°20′29″N 140°13′07″E
- Construction began: 1997
- Opening date: 2004

Dam and spillways
- Height: 21.6 m (71 ft)
- Length: 99.8 m (327 ft)

Reservoir
- Total capacity: 360,000 m^{3} (13,000,000 cu ft)
- Catchment area: 0.6 km^{2} (0.23 sq mi)
- Surface area: 90 hectares (220 acres)

Yamauchi Dam is an earthfill dam located in Chiba Prefecture in Japan. The dam is used for irrigation. The catchment area of the dam is 0.6 km^{2}. The dam impounds about 90 ha of land when full and can store 360 thousand cubic meters of water. The construction of the dam was started on 1997 and completed in 2004.
