= Nyu-zeki Dam =

Dam in Chiba Prefecture, Japan

Nyu-zeki
- Location within Japan
- Location: Chiba Prefecture, Japan
- Coordinates: 35°4′17″N 139°51′10″E
- Opening date: 1940

Dam and spillways
- Height: 16.4 m (54 ft)
- Length: 40 m (130 ft)

Reservoir
- Total capacity: 146,000 m^{3} (5,200,000 cu ft)
- Catchment area: 0.7 km^{2} (0.27 sq mi)
- Surface area: 2 hectares (4.9 acres)

Nyu-zeki is an earthfill dam located in Chiba Prefecture in Japan. The dam is used for irrigation. The catchment area of the dam is 0.7 km^{2}. The dam impounds about 2 ha of land when full and can store 146 thousand cubic meters of water. The construction of the dam was completed in 1940.
