= Uryu-ko Dam =

Dam in Chiba Prefecture, Japan

Uryu-ko
- Location within Japan
- Location: Chiba Prefecture, Japan
- Coordinates: 35°20′52″N 140°22′26″E
- Opening date: 1951

Dam and spillways
- Height: 15 m (49 ft)
- Length: 110 m (360 ft)

Reservoir
- Total capacity: 264,000 m^{3} (9,300,000 cu ft)
- Catchment area: 0.3 km^{2} (0.12 sq mi)
- Surface area: 4 hectares (9.9 acres)

Uryu-ko is an earthfill dam located in Chiba Prefecture in Japan. The dam is used for irrigation. The catchment area of the dam is 0.3 km^{2}. The dam impounds about 4 ha of land when full and can store 264 thousand cubic meters of water. The construction of the dam was completed in 1951.
