= Azuma Dam (Hokkaido) =

Dam in Hokkaido Prefecture, Japan

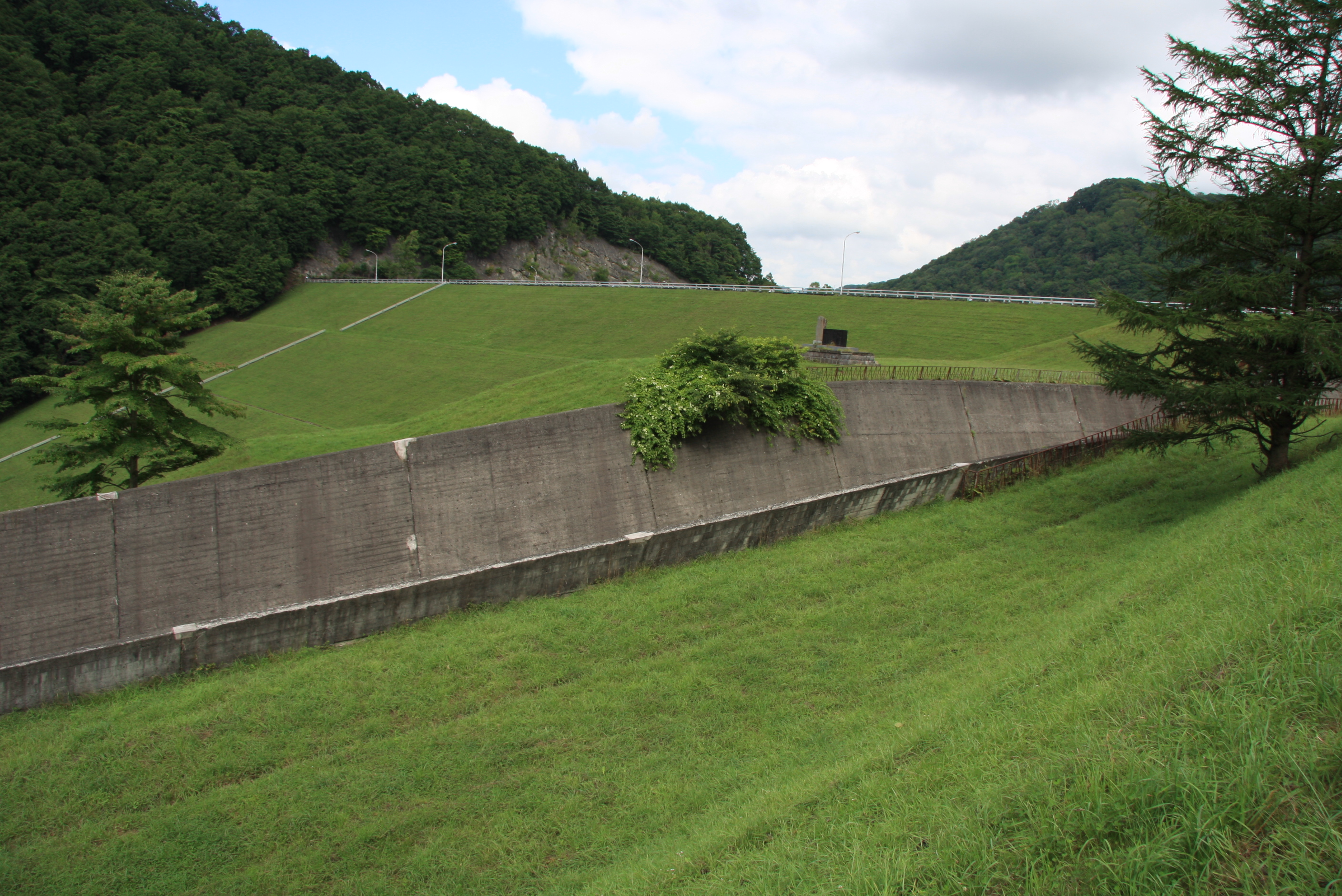

- Location within Japan
- Interactive map of Azuma Dam
- Location: Hokkaido Prefecture, Japan
- Coordinates: 42°47′42″N 142°2′13″E
- Construction began: 1959
- Opening date: 1970

Dam and spillways
- Height: 38.2 m (125 ft)
- Length: 222 m (728 ft)

Reservoir
- Total capacity: 10080 thousand cubic meters
- Catchment area: 52 sq. km
- Surface area: 93 hectares

Azuma Dam (Japanese: 厚真ダム) is a rockfill dam located in Hokkaido Prefecture in Japan. The dam is used for irrigation. The catchment area of the dam is 52 km^{2}. The dam impounds about 93 ha of land when full and can store 10080 thousand cubic meters of water. The construction of the dam was started on 1959 and completed in 1970.
