= Daiyatsugawa Dam =

Dam in Chiba Prefecture, Japan

- Location within Japan
- Interactive map of Daiyatsugawa Dam
- Location: Chiba Prefecture, Japan
- Coordinates: 35°5′37″N 139°56′10″E
- Construction began: 1971
- Opening date: 1973

Dam and spillways
- Height: 25.5 m (84 ft)
- Length: 50 m (160 ft)

Reservoir
- Total capacity: 190 thousand cubic meters
- Catchment area: 0.9 sq. km
- Surface area: 2 hectares

Daiyatsugawa Dam is a gravity dam located in Chiba Prefecture in Japan. The dam is used for water supply. The catchment area of the dam is 0.9 km^{2}. The dam impounds about 2 ha of land when full and can store 190 thousand cubic meters of water. The construction of the dam was started on 1971 and completed in 1973.
