= Naguma Dam =

Dam in Chiba Prefecture, Japan

- Location within Japan
- Location: Chiba Prefecture, Japan
- Coordinates: 35°13′43″N 140°20′12″E
- Construction began: 1974
- Opening date: 1979

Dam and spillways
- Height: 18.5 m (61 ft)
- Length: 119 m (390 ft)

Reservoir
- Total capacity: 245 thousand cubic meters
- Catchment area: 0.7 sq. km
- Surface area: 53 hectares

Naguma Dam is an earthfill dam located in Chiba Prefecture in Japan. The dam is used for irrigation. The catchment area of the dam is 0.7 km^{2}. The dam impounds about 53 ha of land when full and can store 245 thousand cubic meters of water. The construction of the dam was started on 1974 and completed in 1979.
