= Awa Chuo Dam =

Dam in Chiba Prefecture, Japan

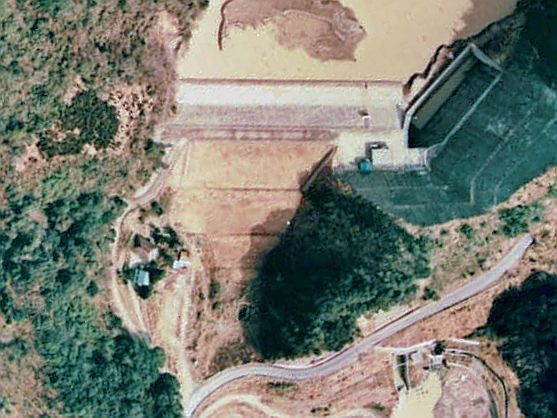

- Location within Japan
- Interactive map of Awa Chuo Dam
- Location: Chiba Prefecture, Japan
- Coordinates: 35°4′30″N 139°57′40″E
- Opening date: 1972

Dam and spillways
- Height: 32 m (105 ft)
- Length: 110 m (360 ft)

Reservoir
- Total capacity: 2113 thousand cubic meters
- Catchment area: 14.9 sq. km
- Surface area: 20 hectares

Awa Chuo Dam is an earthfill dam located in Chiba Prefecture in Japan. The dam is used for irrigation. The catchment area of the dam is 14.9 km^{2}. The dam impounds about 20 ha of land when full and can store 2113 thousand cubic meters of water. The construction of the dam was completed in 1972.
