= Ichinosawa-zeki Dam =

Dam in Chiba Prefecture, Japan

Ichinosawa-zeki
- Location within Japan
- Interactive map of Ichinosawa-zeki
- Location: Chiba Prefecture, Japan
- Coordinates: 35°3′02″N 139°58′28″E
- Opening date: 1951

Dam and spillways
- Height: 19 m (62 ft)
- Length: 84.5 m (277 ft)

Reservoir
- Total capacity: 346 thousand cubic meters
- Catchment area: 3 sq. km
- Surface area: 4 hectares

Ichinosawa-zeki is an earthfill dam located in Chiba Prefecture in Japan. The dam is used for irrigation. The catchment area of the dam is 3 km^{2}. The dam impounds about 4 ha of land when full and can store 346 thousand cubic meters of water. The construction of the dam was completed in 1951.
