= No.2 Okuyatsu Dam =

Dam in Chiba Prefecture, Japan

- Location within Japan
- Location: Chiba Prefecture, Japan
- Coordinates: 35°9′44″N 140°11′28″E
- Construction began: 1987
- Opening date: 1989

Dam and spillways
- Height: 22.7 m (74 ft)
- Length: 52.5 m (172 ft)

Reservoir
- Total capacity: 92,000 m^{3} (3,200,000 cu ft)
- Catchment area: 0.6 km^{2} (0.23 sq mi)
- Surface area: 2 hectares (4.9 acres)

No.2 Okuyatsu Dam is a gravity dam located in Chiba Prefecture in Japan. The dam is used for water supply. The catchment area of the dam is 0.6 km^{2}. The dam impounds about 2 ha of land when full and can store 92 thousand cubic meters of water. The construction of the dam was started on 1987 and completed in 1989.
