= Kanayama Dam (Hokkaido) =

Dam in Hokkaidō Prefecture, Japan

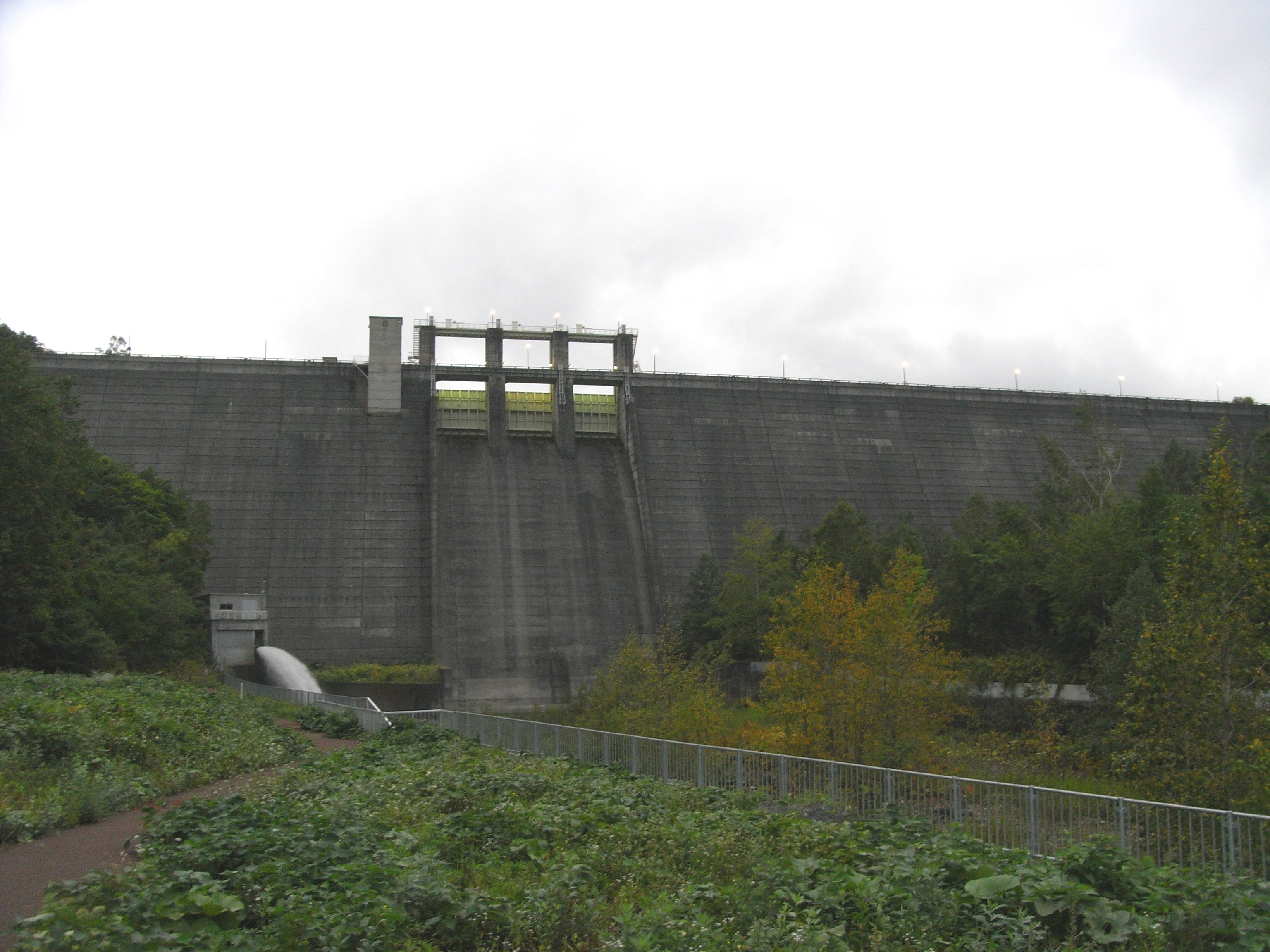
- Interactive map of Kanayama Dam
- Location: Hokkaidō, Japan.
- Coordinates: 43°07′47.0″N 142°26′35.1″E
- Construction began: 1959
- Opening date: 1967

Dam and spillways
- Impounds: Sorachi River
- Height: 57.3 m
- Length: 288.5 m

Reservoir
- Total capacity: 150,450,000 m^{3}
- Catchment area: 470.0 km^{2}
- Surface area: 920 hectares

The Kanayama Dam (金山ダム) is the only Hollow Concrete Gravity dam in Hokkaidō, Japan. The dam was constructed for the purposes of flood control and water use (irrigation, water supply, and hydro electric power generation). The dam produces anywhere from 12,000 kW to 25,000 kW of hydro electric power.
