= Yanagawa Dam (Chiba) =

Dam in Chiba Prefecture, Japan

- Location within Japan
- Location: Chiba Prefecture, Japan
- Coordinates: 35°20′45″N 139°59′06″E
- Construction began: 1989
- Opening date: 1998

Dam and spillways
- Height: 29.3 m (96 ft)
- Length: 284 m (932 ft)

Reservoir
- Total capacity: 1.72 million metres cubed
- Catchment area: 11.4 km^{2} (4.4 sq mi)
- Surface area: 16 hectares (40 acres)

Yanagawa Dam is an earthfill dam located in Chiba Prefecture in Japan. The dam is used for flood control. The catchment area of the dam is 11.4 km^{2}. The dam impounds about 16 ha of land when full and can store 1.72 million m^{3} of water. Construction of the dam began in 1989 and was completed in 1998.
