= Shiraishi Dam =

Dam in Chiba Prefecture, Japan

- Location within Japan
- Location: Chiba Prefecture, Japan
- Coordinates: 35°44′10″N 140°44′43″E
- Construction began: 1954
- Opening date: 1958

Dam and spillways
- Height: 19.5 m (64 ft)
- Length: 100.5 m (330 ft)

Reservoir
- Total capacity: 800,000 m^{3} (28,000,000 cu ft)
- Catchment area: 13.2 km^{2} (5.1 sq mi)
- Surface area: hectares

Shiraishi Dam is an earthfill dam located in Chiba Prefecture in Japan. The dam is used for water supply. The catchment area of the dam is 13.2 km^{2}. The dam impounds about ha of land when full and can store 800 thousand cubic meters of water. The construction of the dam was started on 1954 and completed in 1958.
