= Hirota-zeki Dam =

Dam in Chiba Prefecture, Japan

Hirota-zeki
- Location within Japan
- Interactive map of Hirota-zeki
- Location: Chiba Prefecture, Japan
- Coordinates: 35°3′09″N 139°54′56″E
- Opening date: 1928

Dam and spillways
- Height: 16.7 m (55 ft)
- Length: 57 m (187 ft)

Reservoir
- Total capacity: 304 thousand cubic meters
- Catchment area: 0.8 sq. km
- Surface area: 4 hectares

Hirota-zeki is an earthfill dam located in Chiba Prefecture in Japan. The dam is used for irrigation. The catchment area of the dam is 0.8 km^{2}. The dam impounds about 4 ha of land when full and can store 304 thousand cubic meters of water. The construction of the dam was completed in 1928.
