= Hirasawa Dam =

Dam in Chiba Prefecture, Japan

- Location within Japan
- Interactive map of Hirasawa Dam
- Location: Chiba Prefecture, Japan
- Coordinates: 35°13′10″N 140°13′56″E
- Construction began: 1986
- Opening date: 1998

Dam and spillways
- Height: 25.6 m (84 ft)
- Length: 159 m (522 ft)

Reservoir
- Total capacity: 1160 thousand cubic meters
- Catchment area: 2.4 km^{2} (0.93 sq mi)
- Surface area: 14 hectares

Hirasawa Dam is an earthfill dam located in Chiba Prefecture in Japan. The dam is used for irrigation. The catchment area of the dam is 2.4 km^{2} (0.93 sq mi). The dam impounds about 14 ha of land when full and can store 1160 thousand cubic meters of water. The construction of the dam was started on 1986 and completed in 1998.
