= Masuma Dam =

Dam in Chiba Prefecture, Japan

- Location within Japan
- Location: Chiba Prefecture, Japan
- Coordinates: 35°4′10″N 139°55′43″E
- Construction began: 1966
- Opening date: 1969

Dam and spillways
- Height: 34 m (112 ft)
- Length: 145 m (476 ft)

Reservoir
- Total capacity: 520 thousand cubic meters
- Catchment area: 2.2 sq. km
- Surface area: 54 hectares

Masuma Dam is a gravity dam located in Chiba Prefecture in Japan. The dam is used for water supply. The catchment area of the dam is 2.2 km^{2}. The dam impounds about 54 ha of land when full and can store 520 thousand cubic meters of water. The construction of the dam was started on 1966 and completed in 1969.
