= Motona Dam =

Dam in Chiba Prefecture, Japan

- Location within Japan
- Location: Chiba Prefecture, Japan
- Coordinates: 35°9′13″N 139°50′17″E
- Construction began: 1978
- Opening date: 1979

Dam and spillways
- Height: 28.2 m (93 ft)
- Length: 69 m (226 ft)

Reservoir
- Total capacity: 77 thousand cubic meters
- Catchment area: 0.1 sq. km
- Surface area: 1 hectares

Motona Dam is a rockfill dam located in Chiba Prefecture in Japan. The dam is used for water supply. The catchment area of the dam is 0.1 km^{2}. The dam impounds about 1 ha of land when full and can store 77 thousand cubic meters of water. The construction of the dam was started on 1978 and completed in 1979.
