= Azuma No.2 Dam =

Dam in Chiba Prefecture, Japan

- Location within Japan
- Interactive map of Azuma No.2 Dam
- Location: Chiba Prefecture, Japan
- Coordinates: 35°14′05″N 140°18′26″E
- Construction began: 1979
- Opening date: 1984

Dam and spillways
- Height: 21 m (69 ft)
- Length: 115 m (377 ft)

Reservoir
- Total capacity: 201 thousand cubic meters
- Catchment area: 4.4 sq. km
- Surface area: 4 hectares

Azuma No.2 Dam is an earthfill dam located in Chiba Prefecture in Japan. The dam is used for water supply. The catchment area of the dam is 4.4 km^{2}. The dam impounds about 4 ha of land when full and can store 201 thousand cubic meters of water. The construction of the dam was started on 1979 and completed in 1984.
