= No.2 Fukurogura Dam =

Dam in Chiba Prefecture, Japan

- Location within Japan
- Location: Chiba Prefecture, Japan
- Coordinates: 35°8′49″N 140°7′39″E
- Construction began: 1970
- Opening date: 1971

Dam and spillways
- Height: 24.3 m (80 ft)
- Length: 54 m (177 ft)

Reservoir
- Total capacity: 410,000 m^{3} (14,000,000 cu ft)
- Catchment area: 3.3 km^{2} (1.3 sq mi)
- Surface area: 6 hectares (15 acres)

No.2 Fukurogura Dam is a gravity dam located in Chiba Prefecture in Japan. The dam is used for water supply. The catchment area of the dam is 3.3 km^{2}. The dam impounds about 6 ha of land when full and can store 410 thousand cubic meters of water. The construction of the dam was started on 1970 and completed in 1971.
