= Takataki Dam =

Dam in Chiba Prefecture, Japan

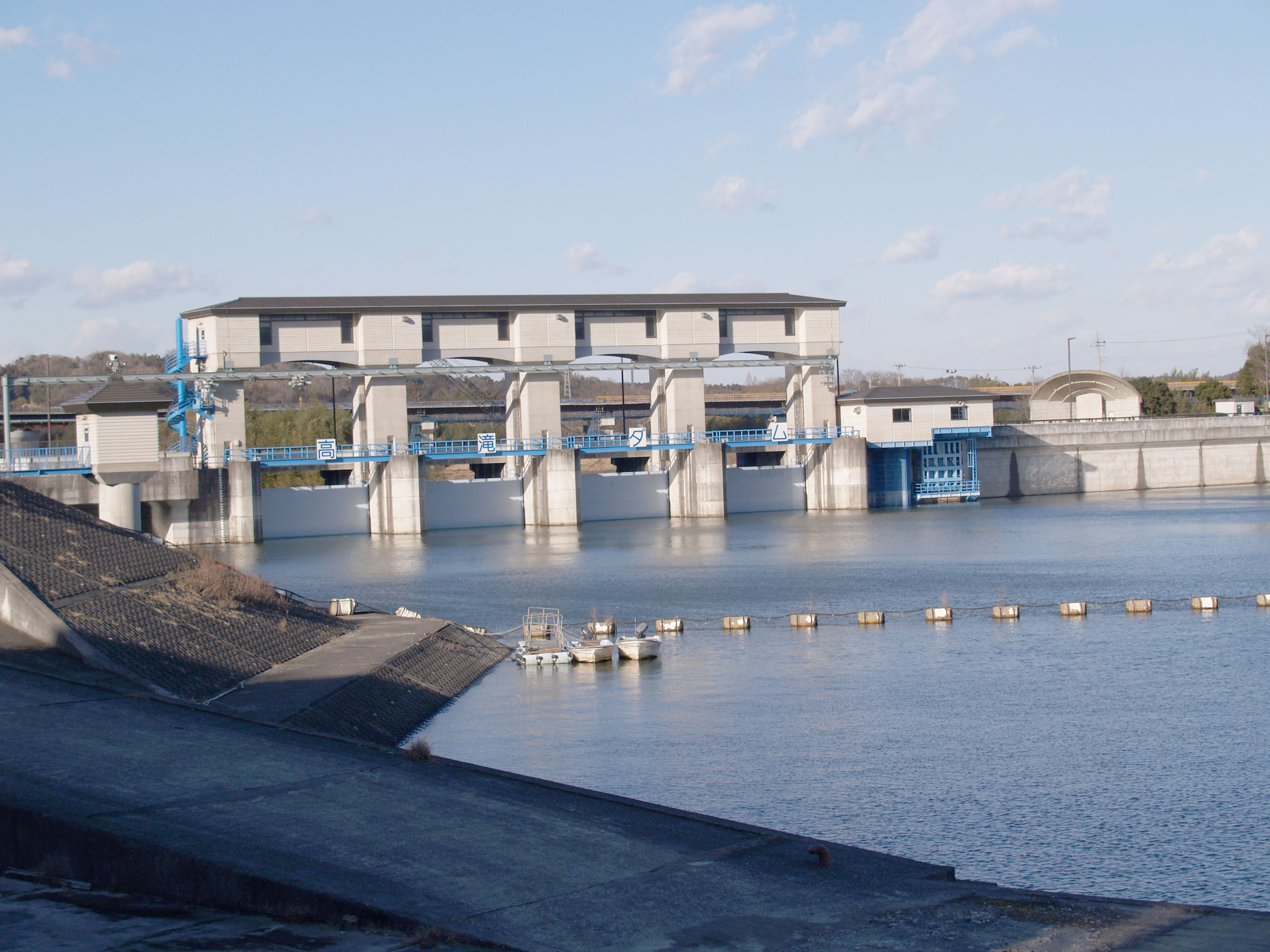

- Location within Japan
- Location: Chiba Prefecture, Japan
- Coordinates: 35°21′28″N 140°8′42″E
- Construction began: 1970
- Opening date: 1990

Dam and spillways
- Height: 24.5 m (80 ft)
- Length: 379 m (1,243 ft)

Reservoir
- Total capacity: 14,300,000 m^{3} (500,000,000 cu ft)
- Catchment area: 107.1 km^{2} (41.4 sq mi)
- Surface area: 199 hectares (490 acres)

Takataki Dam is a gravity dam located in Chiba Prefecture in Japan. The dam is used for flood control and water supply. The catchment area of the dam is 107.1 km^{2}. The dam impounds about 199 ha of land when full and can store 14300 thousand cubic meters of water. The construction of the dam was started on 1970 and completed in 1990.
