= Takinozeki Dam =

Dam in Chiba Prefecture, Japan

Takinozeki
- Location within Japan
- Location: Chiba Prefecture, Japan
- Coordinates: 35°6′49″N 140°1′48″E
- Construction began: 1930
- Opening date: 1937

Dam and spillways
- Height: 18 m (59 ft)
- Length: 104 m (341 ft)

Reservoir
- Total capacity: 31,000 m^{3} (1,100,000 cu ft)
- Catchment area: 0.5 km^{2} (0.19 sq mi)
- Surface area: 2 hectares (4.9 acres)

Takinozeki is an earthfill dam located in Chiba Prefecture in Japan. The dam is used for irrigation. The catchment area of the dam is 0.5 km^{2}. The dam impounds about 2 ha of land when full and can store 31 thousand cubic meters of water. The construction of the dam was started on 1930 and completed in 1937.
