= Konaka-ike Dam =

Dam in Chiba Prefecture, Japan

Konaka-ike
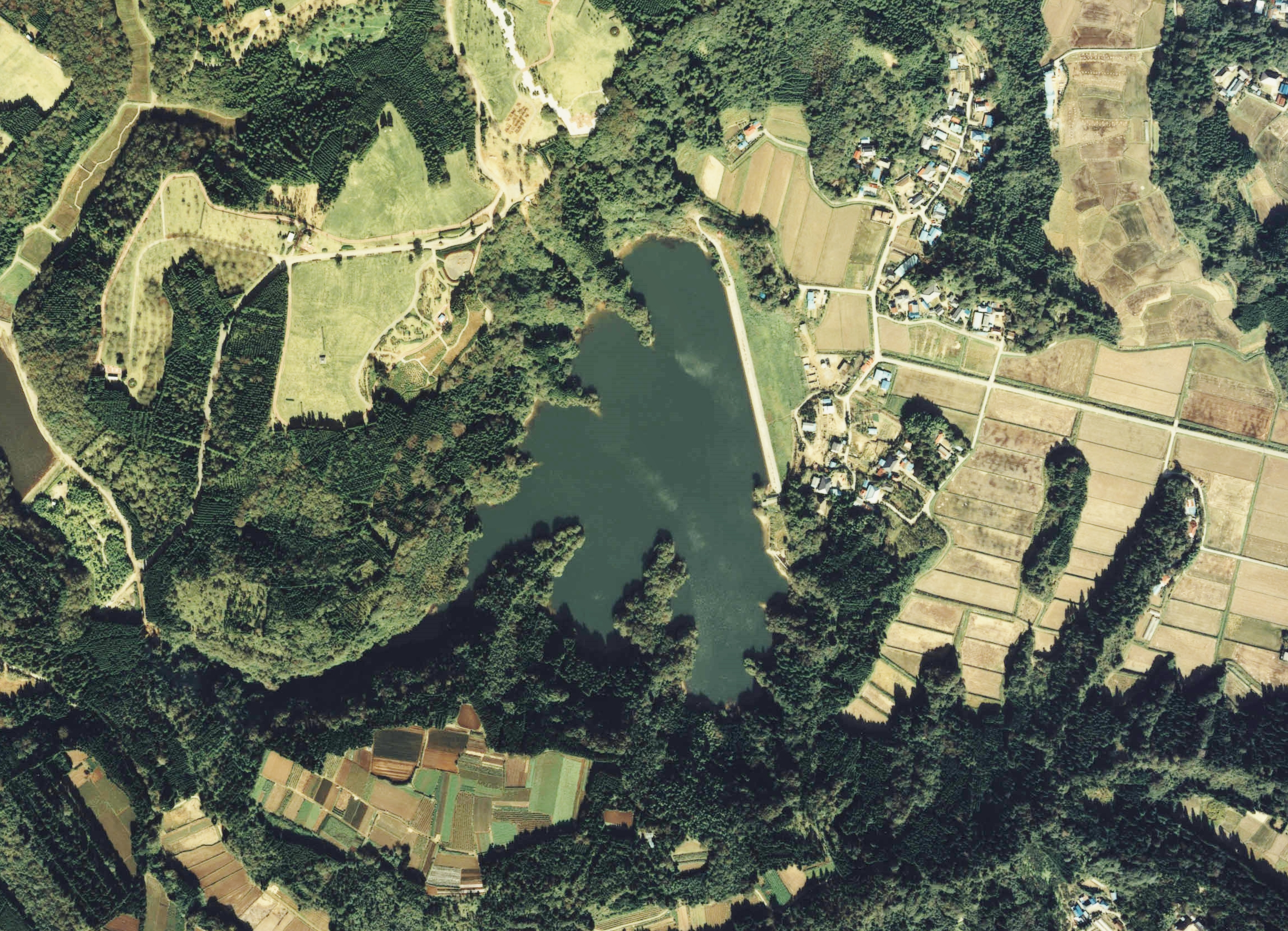

- Location within Japan
- Location: Chiba Prefecture, Japan
- Coordinates: 35°30′53″N 140°17′11″E
- Opening date: 1947

Dam and spillways
- Height: 18.9 m (62 ft)
- Length: 241.8 m (793 ft)

Reservoir
- Total capacity: 1025 thousand cubic meters
- Catchment area: 2.8 sq. km
- Surface area: 11 hectares

Konaka-ike is an earthfill dam located in Chiba Prefecture in Japan. The dam is used for irrigation. The catchment area of the dam is 2.8 km^{2}. The dam impounds about 11 ha of land when full and can store 1025 thousand cubic meters of water. The construction of the dam was completed in 1947.
