= Gundari Dam =

Dam in Chiba Prefecture, Japan

- Location within Japan
- Interactive map of Gundari Dam
- Location: Chiba Prefecture, Japan
- Coordinates: 35°21′00″N 140°22′10″E
- Opening date: 2006

Dam and spillways
- Height: 15.1 m (50 ft)
- Length: 106.2 m (348 ft)

Reservoir
- Total capacity: 306 thousand cubic meters
- Catchment area: 0.5 sq. km
- Surface area: 3 hectares

Gundari Dam is an earthfill dam located in Chiba Prefecture in Japan. The dam is used for irrigation. The catchment area of the dam is 0.5 km^{2}. The dam impounds about 3 ha of land when full and can store 306 thousand cubic meters of water. The construction of the dam was completed in 2006.
