= Arakine Dam =

Dam in Chiba Prefecture, Japan

- Location within Japan
- Interactive map of Arakine Dam
- Location: Chiba Prefecture, Japan
- Coordinates: 35°14′47″N 140°17′01″E
- Construction began: 1970
- Opening date: 1978

Dam and spillways
- Height: 33.5 m (110 ft)
- Length: 302 m (991 ft)

Reservoir
- Total capacity: 2052 thousand cubic meters
- Catchment area: 3.2 sq. km
- Surface area: 20 hectares

Arakine Dam is an earthfill dam located in Chiba Prefecture in Japan. The dam is used for irrigation. The catchment area of the dam is 3.2 km^{2}. The dam impounds about 20 ha of land when full and can store 2052 thousand cubic meters of water. The construction of the dam was started on 1970 and completed in 1978.
