= Bodai Dam =

Dam in Chiba Prefecture, Japan

- Location within Japan
- Interactive map of Bodai Dam
- Location: Chiba Prefecture, Japan
- Coordinates: 35°9′05″N 140°6′25″E
- Construction began: 1983
- Opening date: 1998

Dam and spillways
- Height: 41 m (135 ft)
- Length: 198 m (650 ft)

Reservoir
- Total capacity: 2740 thousand cubic meters
- Catchment area: 6.7 sq. km
- Surface area: 25 hectares

Bodai Dam is a gravity dam located in Chiba Prefecture in Japan. The dam is used for irrigation and water supply. The catchment area of the dam is 6.7 km^{2}. The dam impounds about 25 ha of land when full and can store 2740 thousand cubic meters of water. The construction of the dam was started on 1983 and completed in 1998.
