= Sakuma Dam (Chiba) =

Dam in Chiba Prefecture, Japan

- Location within Japan
- Location: Chiba Prefecture, Japan
- Coordinates: 35°7′26″N 139°53′49″E
- Construction began: 1976
- Opening date: 1986

Dam and spillways
- Height: 25.5 m (84 ft)
- Length: 186 m (610 ft)

Reservoir
- Total capacity: 1,270,000 m^{3} (45,000,000 cu ft)
- Catchment area: 3 km^{2} (1.2 sq mi)
- Surface area: 16 hectares (40 acres)

Sakuma Dam is an earthfill dam located in Chiba Prefecture in Japan. The dam is used for irrigation. The catchment area of the dam is 3 km^{2}. The dam impounds about 16 ha of land when full and can store 1270 thousand cubic meters of water. The construction of the dam was started on 1976 and completed in 1986.
