= Kuramochi Dam =

Dam in Chiba Prefecture, Japan

- Location within Japan
- Location: Chiba Prefecture, Japan
- Coordinates: 35°22′34″N 140°12′40″E
- Construction began: 1967
- Opening date: 1968

Dam and spillways
- Height: 17.5 m (57 ft)
- Length: 61.7 m (202 ft)

Reservoir
- Total capacity: 77 thousand cubic meters
- Catchment area: 0.4 sq. km
- Surface area: 14 hectares

Kuramochi Dam is an earthfill dam located in Chiba Prefecture in Japan. The dam is used for irrigation. The catchment area of the dam is 0.4 km^{2}. The dam impounds about 14 ha of land when full and can store 77 thousand cubic meters of water. The construction of the dam was started in 1967 and completed in 1968.
