= Matsube Dam =

Dam in Chiba Prefecture, Japan

- Location within Japan
- Location: Chiba Prefecture, Japan
- Coordinates: 35°9′35″N 140°16′54″E
- Construction began: 1975
- Opening date: 1976

Dam and spillways
- Height: 21.2 m (70 ft)
- Length: 85 m (279 ft)

Reservoir
- Total capacity: 175 thousand cubic meters
- Catchment area: 0.1 sq. km
- Surface area: 3 hectares

Matsube Dam is an earthfill dam located in Chiba Prefecture in Japan. The dam is used for water supply. The catchment area of the dam is 0.1 km^{2}. The dam impounds about 3 ha of land when full and can store 175 thousand cubic meters of water. The construction of the dam was started in 1975 and completed in 1976.
