= Ozawa Dam (Chiba) =

Dam in Chiba Prefecture, Japan

- Location within Japan
- Location: Chiba Prefecture, Japan
- Coordinates: 35°21′33″N 140°14′50″E
- Construction began: 1989
- Opening date: 1992

Dam and spillways
- Height: 23.9 m (78 ft)
- Length: 83.5 m (274 ft)

Reservoir
- Total capacity: 335,000 m^{3} (11,800,000 cu ft)
- Catchment area: 0.7 km^{2} (0.27 sq mi)
- Surface area: 5 hectares (12 acres)

Ozawa Dam is an earthfill dam located in Chiba Prefecture in Japan. The dam is used for irrigation. The catchment area of the dam is 0.7 km^{2}. The dam impounds about 5 ha of land when full and can store 335 thousand cubic meters of water. The construction of the dam was started on 1989 and completed in 1992.
