= Sakuna Dam =

Dam in Chiba Prefecture, Japan

- Location within Japan
- Location: Chiba Prefecture, Japan
- Coordinates: 34°57′36″N 139°53′21″E
- Construction began: 1971
- Opening date: 1977

Dam and spillways
- Height: 24.5 m (80 ft)
- Length: 145 m (476 ft)

Reservoir
- Total capacity: 630,000 m^{3} (22,000,000 cu ft)
- Catchment area: 2.1 km^{2} (0.81 sq mi)
- Surface area: 9 hectares (22 acres)

Sakuna Dam is a gravity dam located in Chiba Prefecture in Japan. The dam is used for water supply. The catchment area of the dam is 2.1 km^{2}. The dam impounds about 9 ha of land when full and can store 630 thousand cubic meters of water. The construction of the dam was started on 1971 and completed in 1977.
