= Okubo Dam =

Dam in Chiba Prefecture, Japan

- Location within Japan
- Location: Chiba Prefecture, Japan
- Coordinates: 35°16′03″N 139°52′32″E
- Construction began: 1972
- Opening date: 1981

Dam and spillways
- Height: 29.5 m (97 ft)
- Length: 140 m (460 ft)

Reservoir
- Total capacity: 326,000 m^{3} (11,500,000 cu ft)
- Catchment area: 2 km^{2} (0.77 sq mi)
- Surface area: 4 hectares (9.9 acres)

Okubo Dam is an earthfill dam located in Chiba Prefecture in Japan. The dam is used for water supply. The catchment area of the dam is 2 km^{2}. The dam impounds about 4 ha of land when full and can store 326 thousand cubic meters of water. The construction of the dam was started on 1972 and completed in 1981.
