= Kanayama Dam (Chiba) =

Dam in Chiba Prefecture, Japan

- Location within Japan
- Interactive map of Kanayama Dam
- Location: Chiba Prefecture, Japan
- Coordinates: 35°9′09″N 140°4′34″E
- Opening date: 1962

Dam and spillways
- Height: 28.3 m (93 ft)
- Length: 110 m (360 ft)

Reservoir
- Total capacity: 1801 thousand cubic meters
- Catchment area: 5.5 sq. km
- Surface area: 21 hectares

Kanayama Dam is an earthfill dam located in Chiba Prefecture in Japan. The dam is used for irrigation. The catchment area of the dam is 5.5 km^{2}. The dam impounds about 21 ha of land when full and can store 1801 thousand cubic meters of water. The construction of the dam was completed in 1962.
