= Shinnakano Dam =

Dam in Hokkaido Prefecture, Japan

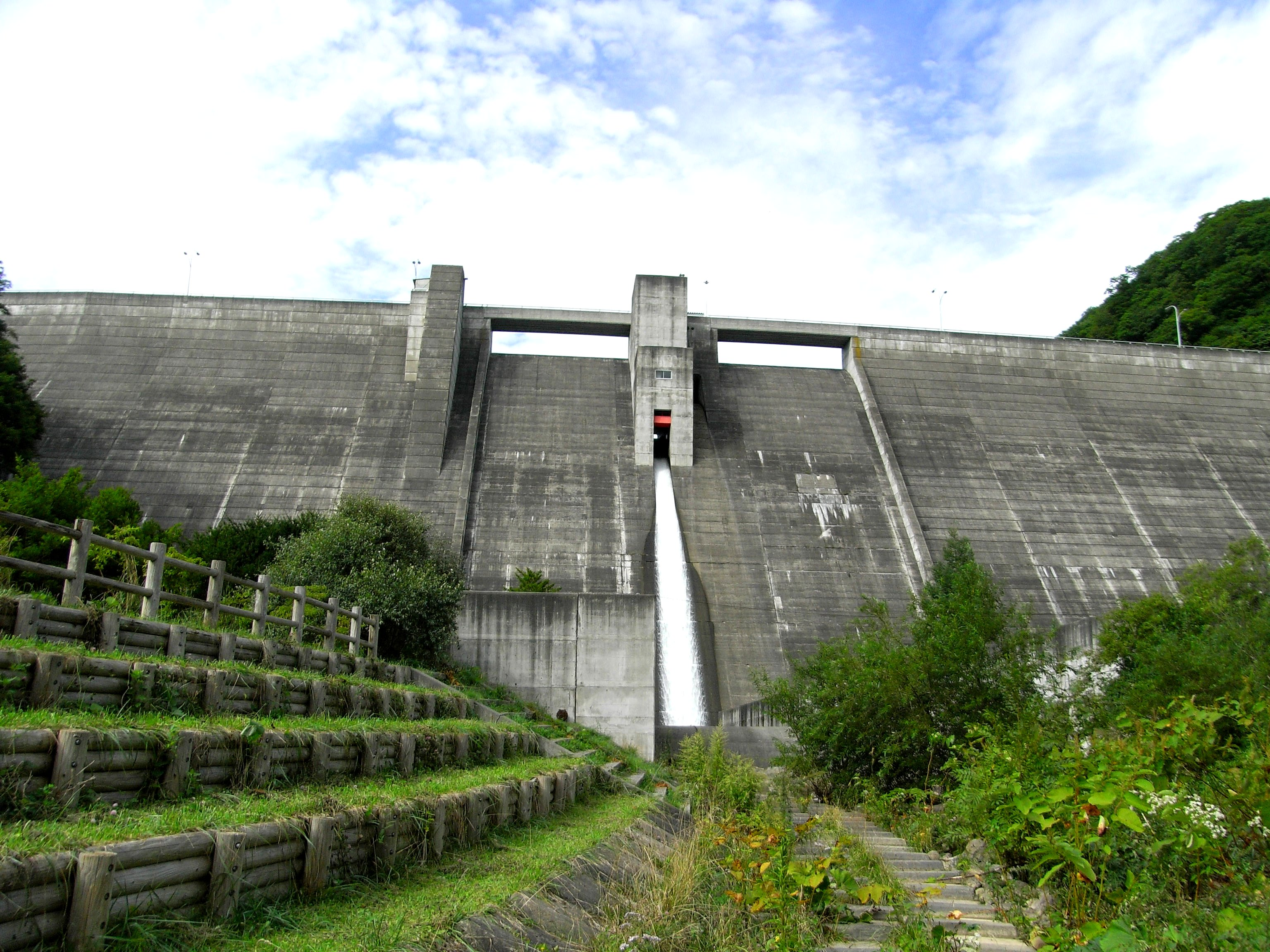

- Location within Japan
- Location: Hokkaido Prefecture, Japan
- Coordinates: 41°52′13″N 140°47′09″E
- Construction began: 1971
- Opening date: 1984

Dam and spillways
- Height: 74.9 m (246 ft)
- Length: 248 m (814 ft)

Reservoir
- Total capacity: 3,340,000 m^{3} (118,000,000 cu ft)
- Catchment area: 17.5 km^{2} (6.8 sq mi)
- Surface area: 18 hectares (44 acres)

Shinnakano Dam (Japanese: 新中野ダム（再）) is a gravity dam located in Hokkaido Prefecture in Japan. The dam is used for flood control and water supply. Its catchment area is 17.5 km^{2}. When full, the dam impounds about 18 ha of land and can store 3340 thousand cubic meters of water. The construction started in 1971 and was completed in 1984.
