= Nokanan Dam =

Dam in Hokkaido Prefecture, Japan

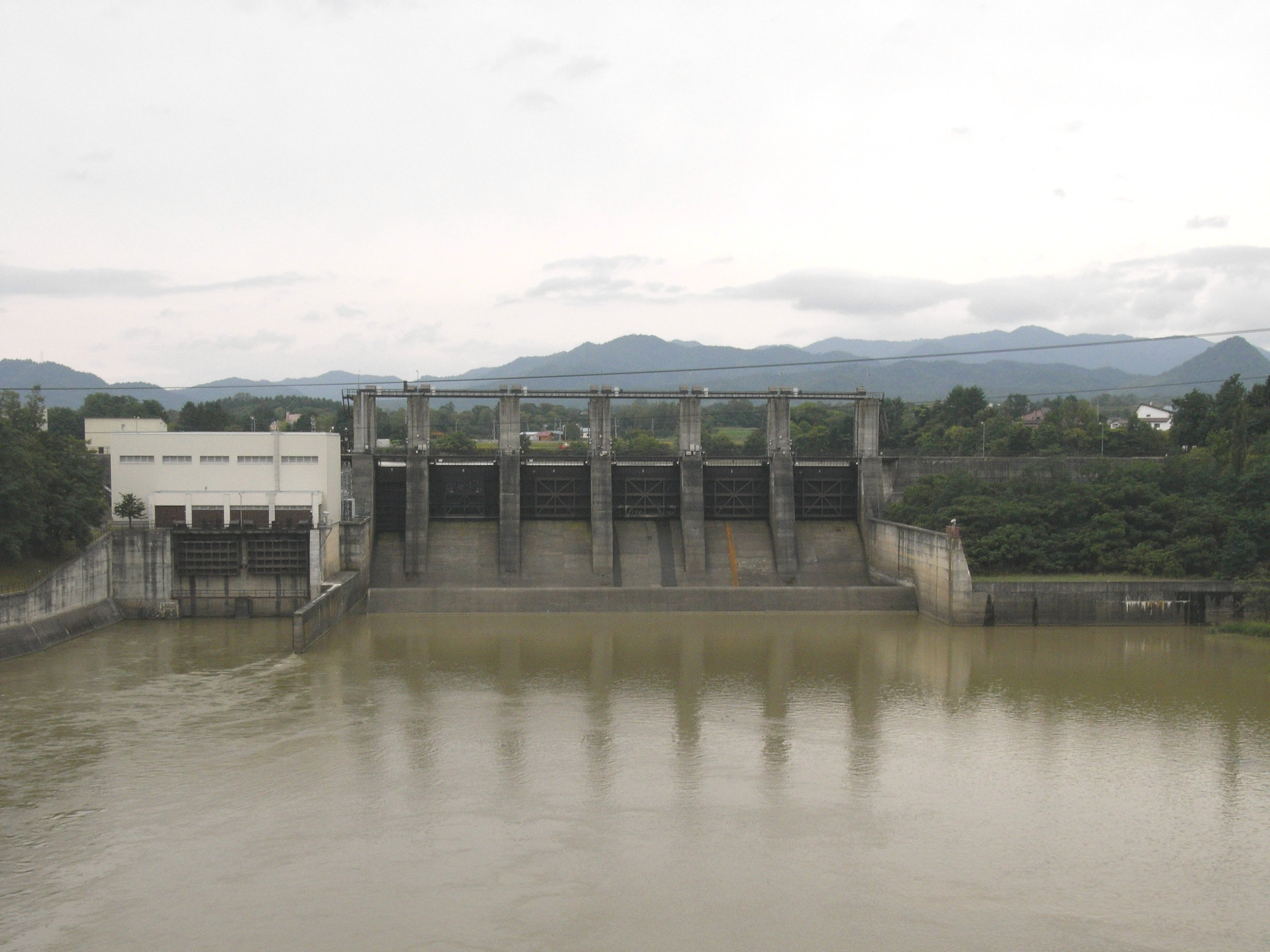

- Location within Japan
- Location: Hokkaido Prefecture, Japan
- Coordinates: 43°26′35″N 142°13′53″E
- Construction began: 1969
- Opening date: 1978

Dam and spillways
- Height: 41.5 m (136 ft)
- Length: 312.5 m (1,025 ft)

Reservoir
- Total capacity: 4,640,000 m^{3} (164,000,000 cu ft)
- Catchment area: 30 km^{2} (12 sq mi)
- Surface area: 37 hectares (91 acres)

Nokanan Dam (Japanese: 野花南ダム) is an earthfill dam located in Hokkaido Prefecture in Japan. The dam is used for irrigation. The catchment area of the dam is 30 km^{2}. The dam impounds about 37 ha of land when full and can store 4640 thousand cubic meters of water. The construction of the dam was started on 1969 and completed in 1978.
