= Iwachishi Dam =

Dam in Hokkaido Prefecture, Japan

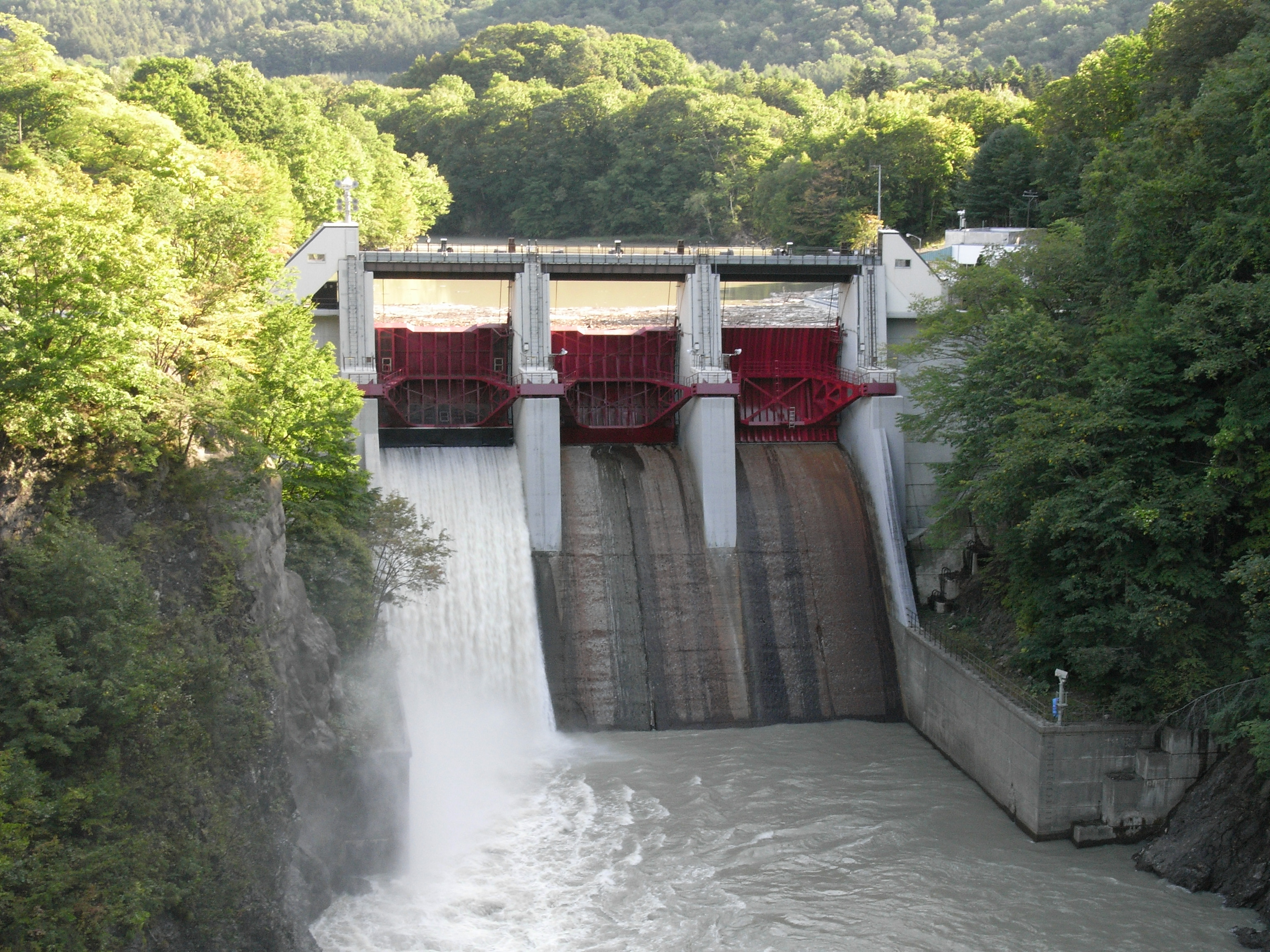

- Location within Japan
- Interactive map of Iwachishi Dam
- Location: Hokkaido Prefecture, Japan
- Coordinates: 42°47′47″N 142°23′48″E
- Construction began: 1956
- Opening date: 1958

Dam and spillways
- Height: 33 m (108 ft)
- Length: 92.2 m (302 ft)

Reservoir
- Total capacity: 5040 thousand cubic meters
- Catchment area: 644 sq. km
- Surface area: 45 hectares

Iwachishi Dam (Japanese: 岩知志ダム) is a gravity dam located in Hokkaido Prefecture in Japan. The dam is used for power production. The catchment area of the dam is 644 km^{2}. The dam impounds about 45 ha of land when full and can store 5040 thousand cubic meters of water. The construction of the dam was started on 1956 and completed in 1958.
