= Sanru Dam =

Dam in Hokkaido Prefecture, Japan

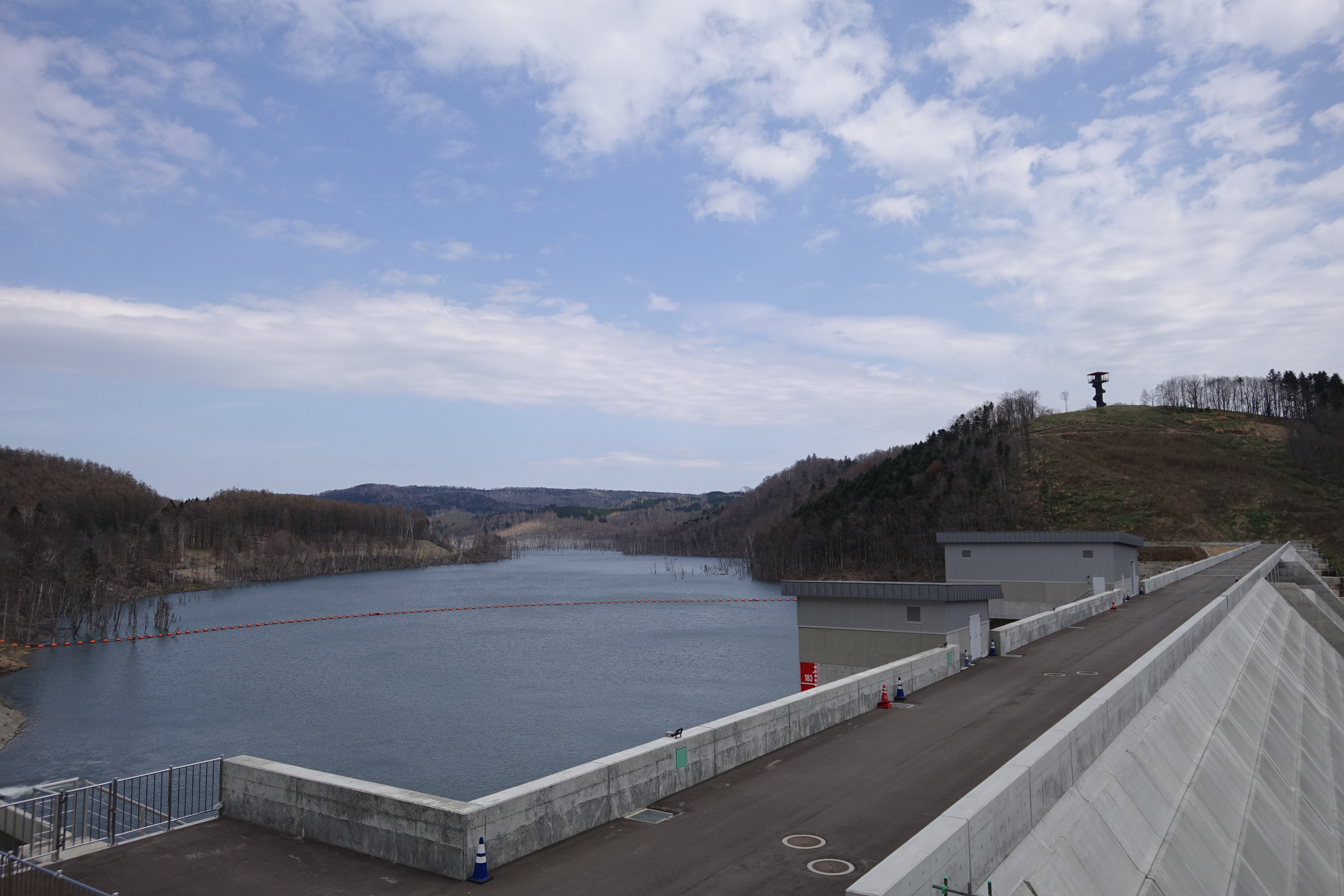

- Location within Japan
- Location: Hokkaido Prefecture, Japan
- Coordinates: 44°19′50″N 142°38′15″E
- Construction began: 1988
- Opening date: 2018

Dam and spillways
- Height: 46 m (151 ft)
- Length: 350 m (1,150 ft)

Reservoir
- Total capacity: 57,200,000 m^{3} (2.02×10^{9} cu ft)
- Catchment area: 182.5 km^{2} (70.5 sq mi)
- Surface area: 380 hectares (940 acres)

Sanru Dam (Japanese: サンルダム) is a trapezoidal dam located in Hokkaido Prefecture in Japan. The dam is used for flood control, water supply and power production. The catchment area of the dam is 182.5 km^{2}. The dam impounds about 380 ha of land when full and can store 57200 thousand cubic meters of water. The construction of the dam was started on 1988 and completed in 2018.
