= Midori Dam =

Dam in Hokkaido Prefecture, Japan

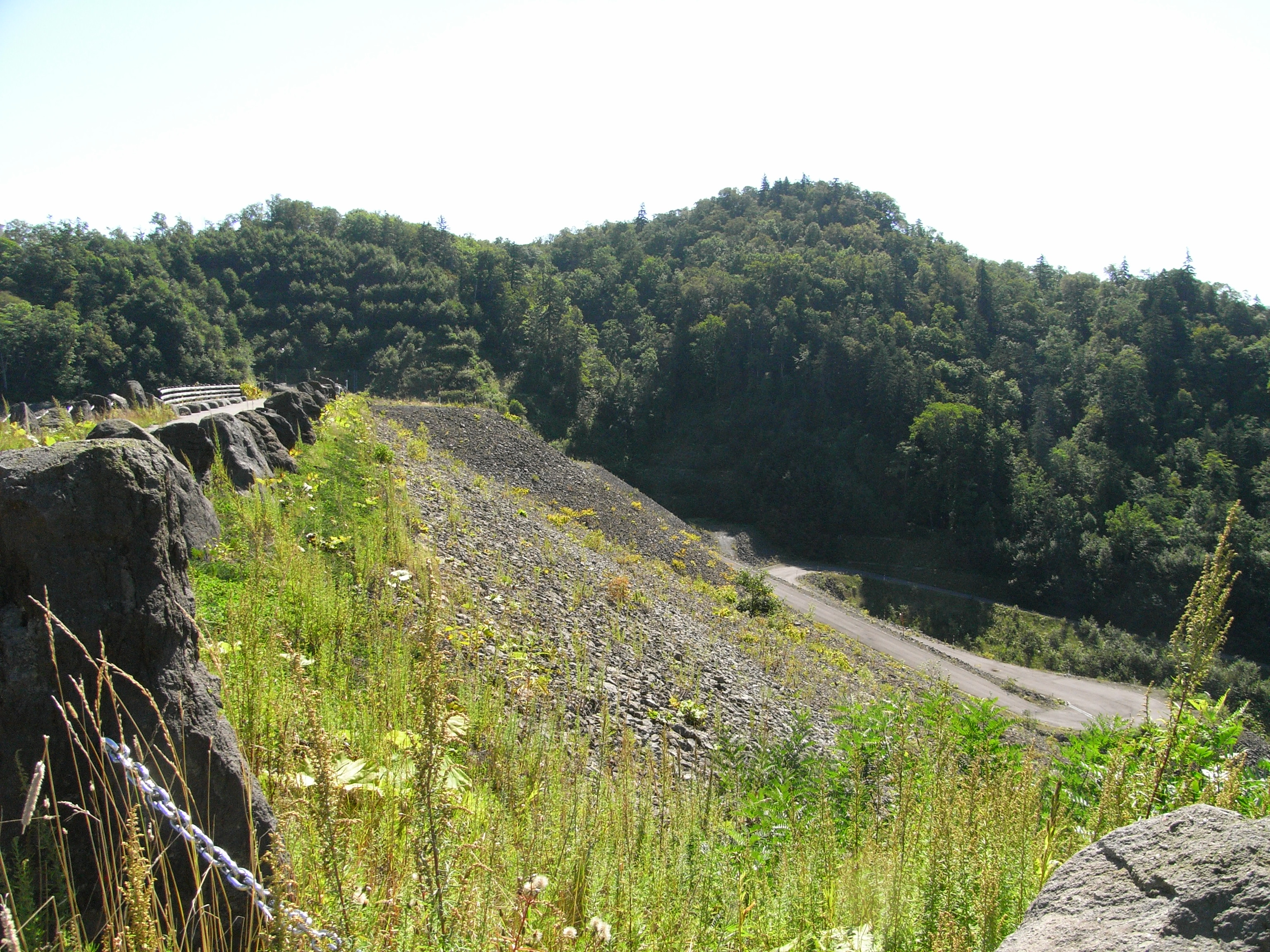

- Location within Japan
- Location: Hokkaido Prefecture, Japan
- Coordinates: 43°40′13″N 144°37′45″E
- Construction began: 1974
- Opening date: 2003

Dam and spillways
- Height: 73 m (240 ft)
- Length: 345 m (1,132 ft)

Reservoir
- Total capacity: 7100 thousand cubic meters
- Catchment area: 20.3 sq. km
- Surface area: 53 hectares

Midori Dam (Japanese: 緑ダム) is a rockfill dam located in Hokkaido Prefecture in Japan. The dam is used for irrigation. The catchment area of the dam is 20.3 km^{2}. The dam impounds about 53 ha of land when full and can store 7100 thousand cubic meters of water. The construction of the dam was started on 1974 and completed in 2003.
