= Makinouchi Dam =

Dam in Hokkaido Prefecture, Japan

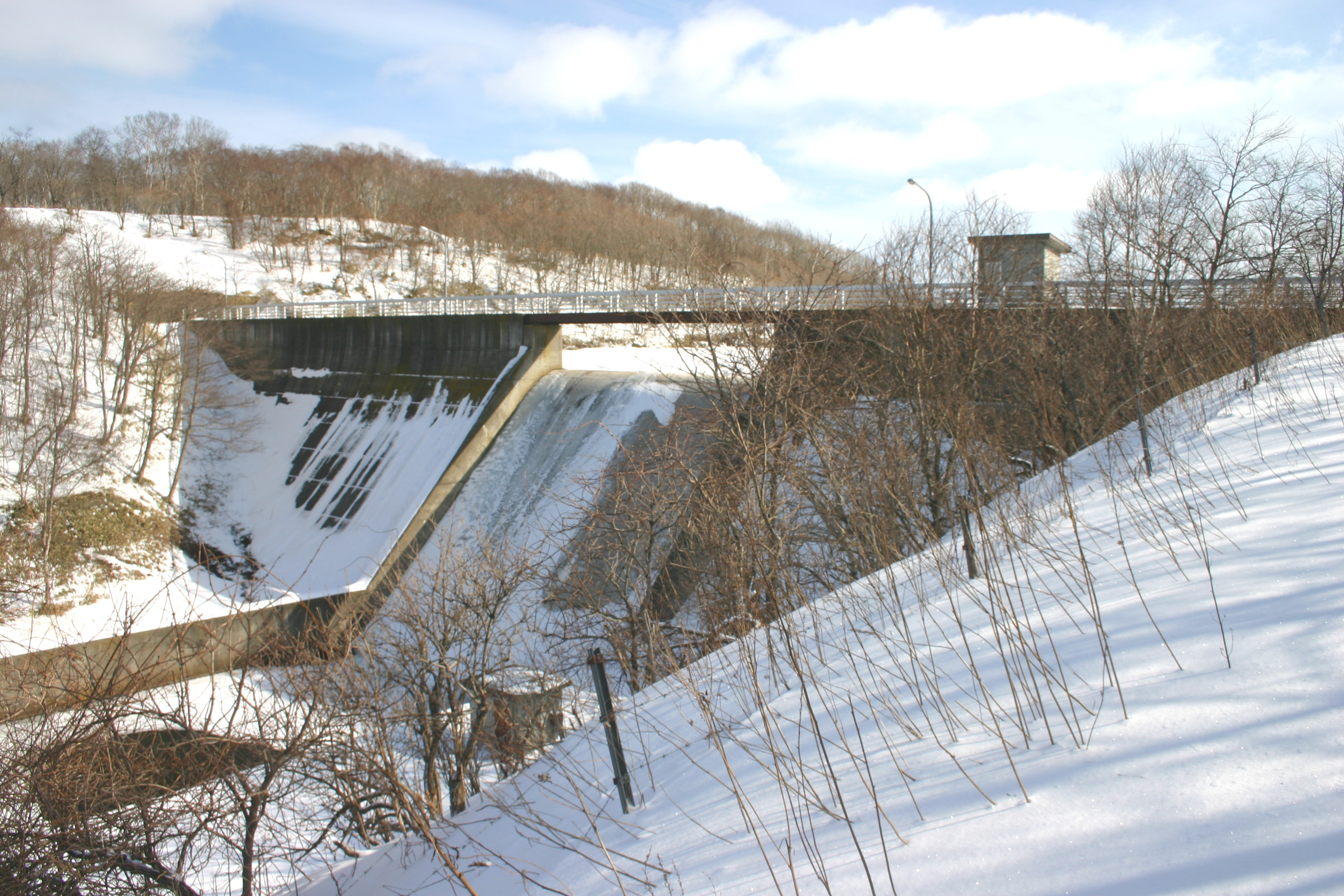

- Location within Japan
- Location: Hokkaido Prefecture, Japan
- Coordinates: 43°21′30″N 145°38′20″E
- Construction began: 1978
- Opening date: 1980

Dam and spillways
- Height: 18.5 m (61 ft)
- Length: 105 m (344 ft)

Reservoir
- Total capacity: 696 thousand cubic meters
- Catchment area: 5 sq. km
- Surface area: 18 hectares

Makinouchi Dam (Japanese: 牧の内ダム) is a gravity dam located in Hokkaido Prefecture in Japan. The dam is used for water supply. The catchment area of the dam is 5 km^{2}. The dam impounds about 18 ha of land when full and can store 696 thousand cubic meters of water. The construction of the dam was started on 1978 and completed in 1980.
