= Uryu Doentei Earth-fill Dam =

Dam in Hokkaido Prefecture, Japan

- Location within Japan
- Location: Hokkaido Prefecture, Japan
- Coordinates: 44°17′34″N 142°12′14″E
- Construction began: 1939
- Opening date: 1943

Dam and spillways
- Height: 22 m (72 ft)
- Length: 442 m (1,450 ft)

Reservoir
- Total capacity: 244,653,000 m^{3} (8.6398×10^{9} cu ft)
- Catchment area: 368.5 km^{2} (142.3 sq mi)
- Surface area: 2,373 hectares (5,860 acres)

Uryu Doentei Earth-fill Dam (Japanese: 雨竜土堰堤) is an earthfill dam located in Hokkaido Prefecture in Japan. The dam is used for power production. The catchment area of the dam is 368.5 km^{2}. The dam impounds about 2373 ha of land when full and can store 244653 thousand cubic meters of water. The construction of the dam was started on 1939 and completed in 1943.
