= Pepan Dam =

Dam in Hokkaido Prefecture, Japan

- Location within Japan
- Location: Hokkaido Prefecture, Japan
- Coordinates: 43°42′51″N 142°39′55″E
- Construction began: 1973
- Opening date: 1997

Dam and spillways
- Height: 49.2 m (161 ft)
- Length: 312.5 m (1,025 ft)

Reservoir
- Total capacity: 3,800,000 m^{3} (130,000,000 cu ft)
- Catchment area: 32 km^{2} (12 sq mi)
- Surface area: 27 hectares (67 acres)

Pepan Dam (Japanese: ペーパンダム) is a rockfill dam located in Hokkaido Prefecture in Japan. The dam is primarily used for irrigation. It has a catchment area of 32 km^{2} (12 sq mi). The dam impounds approximately 27 ha (67 acres) of land when full and can store 3,800 thousand cubic metres (130×10^{6} cu ft) of water. The construction of the dam was started on 1973 and was completed in 1997.
