= Toppu Dam =

Dam in Hokkaido Prefecture, Japan

- Location within Japan
- Location: Hokkaido Prefecture, Japan
- Coordinates: 43°35′47″N 141°37′07″E
- Construction began: 1979
- Opening date: 2013

Dam and spillways
- Height: 78.4 m (257 ft)
- Length: 309 m (1,014 ft)

Reservoir
- Total capacity: 36,000,000 m^{3} (1.3×10^{9} cu ft)
- Catchment area: 65.3 km^{2} (25.2 sq mi)
- Surface area: 159 hectares (390 acres)

Toppu Dam (Japanese: 徳富ダム) is a gravity dam located in Hokkaido Prefecture in Japan. The dam is used for flood control, irrigation and water supply. The catchment area of the dam is 65.3 km^{2}. The dam impounds about 159 ha of land when full and can store 36000 thousand cubic meters of water. The construction of the dam was started on 1979 and completed in 2013.
