= Ebeotsu No.1 Dam =

Dam in Hokkaido Prefecture, Japan

- Location within Japan
- Interactive map of Ebeotsu No.1 Dam
- Location: Hokkaido Prefecture, Japan
- Coordinates: 43°36′59″N 141°59′19″E
- Construction began: 1972
- Opening date: 1977

Dam and spillways
- Height: 18.5 m (61 ft)
- Length: 206.5 m (677 ft)

Reservoir
- Total capacity: 354 thousand cubic meters
- Catchment area: 1.1 sq. km
- Surface area: 3 hectares

Ebeotsu No.1 Dam (Japanese: 江部乙第１号ダム) is an earthfill dam located in Hokkaido Prefecture in Japan. The dam is used for irrigation. The catchment area of the dam is 1.1 km^{2}. The dam impounds about 3 ha of land when full and can store 354 thousand cubic meters of water. The construction of the dam was started on 1972 and completed in 1977.
