= Obira Dam =

Dam in Hokkaido Prefecture, Japan

- Location within Japan
- Location: Hokkaido Prefecture, Japan
- Coordinates: 44°3′53″N 141°54′22″E
- Construction began: 1972
- Opening date: 1992

Dam and spillways
- Height: 42.4 m (139 ft)
- Length: 475 m (1,558 ft)

Reservoir
- Total capacity: 33,200,000 m^{3} (1.17×10^{9} cu ft)
- Catchment area: 186.1 km^{2} (71.9 sq mi)
- Surface area: 265 hectares (650 acres)

Obira Dam (Japanese: 小平ダム) is a gravity dam located in Hokkaido Prefecture in Japan. The dam is used for flood control, irrigation and water supply. The catchment area of the dam is 186.1 km^{2}. The dam impounds about 265 ha of land when full and can store 33200 thousand cubic meters of water. The construction of the dam was started on 1972 and completed in 1992.
