= Uennai Dam =

Dam in Hokkaido Prefecture, Japan

- Location within Japan
- Location: Hokkaido Prefecture, Japan
- Coordinates: 44°0′37″N 142°11′12″E
- Construction began: 1968
- Opening date: 1978

Dam and spillways
- Height: 26.8 m (88 ft)
- Length: 320 m (1,050 ft)

Reservoir
- Total capacity: 6,750,000 m^{3} (238,000,000 cu ft)
- Catchment area: 15.4 km^{2} (5.9 sq mi)
- Surface area: 81 hectares (200 acres)

Uennai Dam (Japanese: 雨煙内ダム（再）) is an earthfill dam located in Hokkaido Prefecture in Japan. The dam is used for irrigation. The catchment area of the dam is 15.4 km^{2}. The dam impounds about 81 ha of land when full and can store 6,750 thousand cubic meters of water. The construction of the dam was started on 1968 and completed in 1978.
