= Shirakizawa Dam =

Dam in Hokkaido Prefecture, Japan

- Location within Japan
- Location: Hokkaido Prefecture, Japan
- Coordinates: 43°52′17″N 142°0′59″E
- Construction began: 1963
- Opening date: 1968

Dam and spillways
- Height: 23.7 m (78 ft)
- Length: 114.9 m (377 ft)

Reservoir
- Total capacity: 836,000 m^{3} (29,500,000 cu ft)
- Catchment area: 2.5 km^{2} (0.97 sq mi)
- Surface area: 10 hectares (25 acres)

Shirakizawa Dam (Japanese: 白木沢ダム) is an earthfill dam located in Hokkaido Prefecture in Japan. The dam is used for irrigation. The catchment area of the dam is 2.5 km^{2}. The dam impounds about 10 ha of land when full and can store 836 thousand cubic meters of water. The construction of the dam was started on 1963 and completed in 1968.
