= Shimizunosawa Dam =

Dam in Hokkaido Prefecture, Japan

- Location within Japan
- Location: Hokkaido Prefecture, Japan
- Coordinates: 43°0′25″N 141°59′25″E
- Construction began: 1980
- Opening date: 1984

Dam and spillways
- Height: 25.1 m (82 ft)
- Length: 96 m (315 ft)

Reservoir
- Total capacity: 860,000 m^{3} (30,000,000 cu ft)
- Catchment area: 4.9 km^{2} (1.9 sq mi)
- Surface area: 12 hectares (30 acres)

Shimizunosawa Dam (Japanese: 清水の沢ダム) is a gravity dam located in Hokkaido Prefecture in Japan. The dam is used for water supply. The catchment area of the dam is 4.9 km^{2}. The dam impounds about 12 ha of land when full and can store 860 thousand cubic meters of water. The construction of the dam was started on 1980 and completed in 1984.
