= Tomamae Dam =

Dam in Hokkaido Prefecture, Japan

- Location within Japan
- Location: Hokkaido Prefecture, Japan
- Coordinates: 44°10′05″N 141°49′48″E
- Construction began: 1991
- Opening date: 1999

Dam and spillways
- Height: 34.8 m (114 ft)
- Length: 155 m (509 ft)

Reservoir
- Total capacity: 7,400,000 m^{3} (260,000,000 cu ft)
- Catchment area: 56.4 km^{2} (21.8 sq mi)
- Surface area: 83 hectares (210 acres)

Tomamae Dam (苫前ダム, Tomamae damu) is a gravity dam located in Hokkaido Prefecture, in Japan. The dam is used for irrigation. The catchment area of the dam is 56.4 km^{2}. The dam impounds about 83 ha of land when full and can store 7400 thousand cubic meters of water. The construction of the dam was started on 1991 and completed in 1999.
