= Uguigawa Dam =

Dam in Hokkaido Prefecture, Japan

- Location within Japan
- Location: Hokkaido Prefecture, Japan
- Coordinates: 41°57′33″N 140°13′52″E
- Construction began: 1979
- Opening date: 1986

Dam and spillways
- Height: 21.1 m (69 ft)
- Length: 114 m (374 ft)

Reservoir
- Total capacity: 308,000 m^{3} (10,900,000 cu ft)
- Catchment area: 2.2 km^{2} (0.85 sq mi)
- Surface area: 13 hectares (32 acres)

Uguigawa Dam (Japanese: 鰔川ダム) is an earthfill dam located in Hokkaido Prefecture in Japan. The dam is used for irrigation. The catchment area of the dam is 2.2 km^{2}. The dam impounds about 13 ha of land when full and can store 308 thousand cubic meters of water. The construction of the dam was started on 1979 and completed in 1986.
