= Yabetsu Dam =

Dam in Hokkaido Prefecture, Japan

- Location within Japan
- Location: Hokkaido Prefecture, Japan
- Coordinates: 41°50′21″N 140°54′29″E
- Construction began: 1969
- Opening date: 1975

Dam and spillways
- Height: 33.6 m (110 ft)
- Length: 84 m (276 ft)

Reservoir
- Total capacity: 3,800,000 m^{3} (130,000,000 cu ft)
- Catchment area: 32.5 km^{2} (12.5 sq mi)
- Surface area: 42 hectares (100 acres)

Yabetsu Dam (Japanese: 矢別ダム) is a gravity dam located in Hokkaido Prefecture in Japan. The dam is used for flood control. The catchment area of the dam is 32.5 km^{2}. The dam impounds about 42 ha of land when full and can store 3800 thousand cubic meters of water. The construction of the dam was started on 1969 and completed in 1975.
