= Hokushin Dam =

Dam in Hokkaido Prefecture, Japan

- Location within Japan
- Interactive map of Hokushin Dam
- Location: Hokkaido Prefecture, Japan
- Coordinates: 45°18′58″N 141°53′39″E
- Construction began: 1976
- Opening date: 1980

Dam and spillways
- Height: 32 m (105 ft)
- Length: 180 m (590 ft)

Reservoir
- Total capacity: 6700 thousand cubic meters
- Catchment area: 24.6 sq. km
- Surface area: 71 hectares

Hokushin Dam (Japanese: 北辰ダム) is a rockfill dam located in Hokkaido Prefecture in Japan. The dam is used for water supply. The catchment area of the dam is 24.6 km^{2}. The dam impounds about 71 ha of land when full and can store 6700 thousand cubic meters of water. The construction of the dam was started on 1976 and completed in 1980.

The Hokushin Dam is still in use.
