= Rumoi Dam =

Dam in Hokkaido Prefecture, Japan

- Location within Japan
- Location: Hokkaido Prefecture, Japan
- Coordinates: 43°50′02″N 141°45′41″E
- Construction began: 1984
- Opening date: 2009

Dam and spillways
- Height: 41.2 m (135 ft)
- Length: 440 m (1,440 ft)

Reservoir
- Total capacity: 23,300,000 m^{3} (820,000,000 cu ft)
- Catchment area: 42 km^{2} (16 sq mi)
- Surface area: 220 hectares (540 acres)

Rumoi Dam (Japanese: 留萌ダム) is a rockfill dam located in Hokkaido Prefecture in Japan. The dam is used for flood control and water supply. The catchment area of the dam is 42 km^{2}. The dam impounds about 220 ha of land when full and can store 23300 thousand cubic meters of water. The construction of the dam was started on 1984 and completed in 2009.
