= Seiwa Dam =

Dam in Hokkaido Prefecture, Japan

- Location within Japan
- Location: Hokkaido Prefecture, Japan
- Coordinates: 44°0′11″N 142°17′13″E
- Construction began: 1924
- Opening date: 1926

Dam and spillways
- Height: 15.8 m (52 ft)
- Length: 255 m (837 ft)

Reservoir
- Total capacity: 1,162,000 m^{3} (41,000,000 cu ft)
- Catchment area: 5.7 km^{2} (2.2 sq mi)
- Surface area: 25 hectares (62 acres)

Seiwa Dam (Japanese: 西和ダム) is an earthfill dam located in Hokkaido Prefecture in Japan. The dam is used for irrigation. The catchment area of the dam is 5.7 km^{2}. The dam impounds about 25 ha of land when full and can store 1162 thousand cubic meters of water. The construction of the dam was started on 1924 and completed in 1926.
