= Tomisato Dam =

Dam in Hokkaido Prefecture, Japan

- Location within Japan
- Location: Hokkaido Prefecture, Japan
- Coordinates: 43°51′19″N 143°45′12″E
- Construction began: 1969
- Opening date: 1987

Dam and spillways
- Height: 44.3 m (145 ft)
- Length: 280 m (920 ft)

Reservoir
- Total capacity: 2,800,000 m^{3} (99,000,000 cu ft)
- Catchment area: 8.7 km^{2} (3.4 sq mi)
- Surface area: 21 hectares (52 acres)

Tomisato Dam (Japanese: 富里ダム) is a rockfill dam located in Hokkaido Prefecture in Japan. The dam is used for irrigation. The catchment area of the dam is 8.7 km^{2}. The dam impounds about 21 ha of land when full and can store 2800 thousand cubic meters of water. The construction of the dam was started on 1969 and completed in 1987.
