= Takadomari Dam =

Dam in Hokkaido Prefecture, Japan

- Location within Japan
- Location: Hokkaido Prefecture, Japan
- Coordinates: 43°55′27″N 142°4′51″E
- Construction began: 1949
- Opening date: 1953

Dam and spillways
- Height: 37 m (121 ft)
- Length: 170.5 m (559 ft)

Reservoir
- Total capacity: 21,518,000 m^{3} (759,900,000 cu ft)
- Catchment area: 800 km^{2} (310 sq mi)
- Surface area: 137 hectares (340 acres)

Takadomari Dam (Japanese: 鷹泊ダム) is a gravity dam located in Hokkaido Prefecture in Japan. The dam is used for irrigation and power production. The catchment area of the dam is 800 km^{2}. The dam impounds about 137 ha of land when full and can store 21518 thousand cubic meters of water. The construction of the dam was started on 1949 and completed in 1953.
