= Urakawa Dam =

Dam in Hokkaido Prefecture, Japan

- Location within Japan
- Location: Hokkaido Prefecture, Japan
- Coordinates: 42°14′22″N 142°49′27″E
- Construction began: 1973
- Opening date: 1999

Dam and spillways
- Height: 42.1 m (138 ft)
- Length: 296 m (971 ft)

Reservoir
- Total capacity: 5,630,000 m^{3} (199,000,000 cu ft)
- Catchment area: 18.1 km^{2} (7.0 sq mi)
- Surface area: 60 hectares (150 acres)

Urakawa Dam (Japanese: 浦河ダム) is a gravity dam located in Hokkaido Prefecture in Japan. It is used primarily for flood control. The dam's catchment area is 18.1 km^{2}. The dam impounds about 60 ha of land when full and can store 5.63 million cubic meters of water. The construction of the dam was started on 1973 and completed in 1999.
