= Haborofutamata Dam =

Dam in Hokkaido Prefecture, Japan

- Location within Japan
- Interactive map of Haborofutamata Dam
- Location: Hokkaido Prefecture, Japan
- Coordinates: 44°18′10″N 141°56′34″E
- Construction began: 1967
- Opening date: 1978

Dam and spillways
- Height: 33.6 m (110 ft)
- Length: 125 m (410 ft)

Reservoir
- Total capacity: 4300 thousand cubic meters
- Catchment area: 25.8 sq. km
- Surface area: 36 hectares

Haborofutamata Dam (Japanese: 羽幌二股ダム) is an earthfill dam located in Hokkaido Prefecture in Japan. The dam is used for irrigation. The catchment area of the dam is 25.8 km^{2}. The dam impounds about 36 ha of land when full and can store 4300 thousand cubic meters of water. The construction of the dam was started on 1967 and completed in 1978.
