= Kamiyunai Dam =

Dam in Hokkaido Prefecture, Japan

- Location within Japan
- Interactive map of Kamiyunai Dam
- Location: Hokkaido Prefecture, Japan
- Coordinates: 43°47′46″N 142°9′08″E
- Construction began: 1950
- Opening date: 1956

Dam and spillways
- Height: 15.5 m (51 ft)
- Length: 108.5 m (356 ft)

Reservoir
- Total capacity: 877 thousand cubic meters
- Catchment area: 15.5 sq. km
- Surface area: 20 hectares

Kamiyunai Dam (Japanese: 上湯内ダム) is an earthfill dam located in Hokkaido Prefecture in Japan. The dam is used for irrigation. The catchment area of the dam is 15.5 km^{2}. The dam impounds about 20 ha of land when full and can store 877 thousand cubic meters of water. The construction of the dam was started on 1950 and completed in 1956.
