= Nukanan Dam =

Dam in Hokkaido Prefecture, Japan

- Location within Japan
- Location: Hokkaido Prefecture, Japan
- Coordinates: 43°23′32″N 143°19′43″E
- Opening date: 1960

Dam and spillways
- Height: 18.6 m (61 ft)
- Length: 312.5 m (1,025 ft)

Reservoir
- Total capacity: 665,000 m^{3} (23,500,000 cu ft)
- Catchment area: 368.8 km^{2} (142.4 sq mi)
- Surface area: 19 hectares (47 acres)

Nukanan Dam (Japanese: 糠南ダム) is a gravity concrete & fill dam (compound) dam located in Hokkaido Prefecture in Japan. The dam is used for power production. The catchment area of the dam is 368.8 km^{2}. The dam impounds about 19 ha of land when full and can store 665 thousand cubic meters of water. The construction of the dam was completed in 1960.
