= Etanbetsu Dam =

Dam in Hokkaido Prefecture, Japan

- Location within Japan
- Interactive map of Etanbetsu Dam
- Location: Hokkaido Prefecture, Japan
- Coordinates: 43°55′19″N 142°15′40″E
- Construction began: 1965
- Opening date: 1974

Dam and spillways
- Height: 17.4 m (57 ft)
- Length: 220 m (720 ft)

Reservoir
- Total capacity: 981 thousand cubic meters
- Catchment area: 9.1 sq. km
- Surface area: 19 hectares

Etanbetsu Dam (Japanese: 江丹別ダム) is an earthfill dam located in Hokkaido Prefecture in Japan. The dam is used for irrigation. The catchment area of the dam is 9.1 km^{2}. The dam impounds about 19 ha of land when full and can store 981 thousand cubic meters of water. The construction of the dam was started on 1965 and completed in 1974.
