= Etaibetsu Dam =

Dam in Hokkaido Prefecture, Japan

- Location within Japan
- Interactive map of Etaibetsu Dam
- Location: Hokkaido Prefecture, Japan
- Coordinates: 43°44′38″N 141°43′11″E
- Construction began: 1953
- Opening date: 1967

Dam and spillways
- Height: 35.5 m (116 ft)
- Length: 173 m (568 ft)

Reservoir
- Total capacity: 4372 thousand cubic meters
- Catchment area: 50 sq. km
- Surface area: 41 hectares

Etaibetsu Dam (Japanese: 恵岱別ダム) is a rockfill dam located in Hokkaido Prefecture in Japan. The dam is used for irrigation. The catchment area of the dam is 50 km^{2}. The dam impounds about 41 ha of land when full and can store 4372 thousand cubic meters of water. The construction of the dam was started on 1953 and completed in 1967.
