= Sannosawa No.1 Dam =

Dam in Hokkaido Prefecture, Japan

- Location within Japan
- Location: Hokkaido Prefecture, Japan
- Coordinates: 43°10′26″N 141°50′30″E
- Opening date: 1924

Dam and spillways
- Height: 20 m (66 ft)
- Length: 168 m (551 ft)

Reservoir
- Total capacity: 710,000 m^{3} (25,000,000 cu ft)
- Catchment area: 1.6 km^{2} (0.62 sq mi)
- Surface area: 11 hectares (27 acres)

Sannosawa No.1 Dam (Japanese: 三の沢第一ダム) is an earthfill dam located in Hokkaido Prefecture in Japan. The dam is used for irrigation. The catchment area of the dam is 1.6 km^{2}. The dam impounds about 11 ha of land when full and can store 710 thousand cubic meters of water. The construction of the dam was completed in 1924.
