= Kamiiso Dam =

Dam in Hokkaido Prefecture, Japan

- Location within Japan
- Interactive map of Kamiiso Dam
- Location: Hokkaido Prefecture, Japan
- Coordinates: 41°52′00″N 140°35′54″E
- Construction began: 1971
- Opening date: 1990

Dam and spillways
- Height: 32 m (105 ft)
- Length: 408 m (1,339 ft)

Reservoir
- Total capacity: 3620 thousand cubic meters
- Catchment area: 56.8 sq. km
- Surface area: 44 hectares

Kamiiso Dam (Japanese: 上磯ダム) is a rockfill dam located in Hokkaido Prefecture in Japan. The dam is used for irrigation. The catchment area of the dam is 56.8 km^{2}. The dam impounds about 44 ha of land when full and can store 3620 thousand cubic meters of water. The construction of the dam was started on 1971 and completed in 1990.
