= Haboro Dam =

Dam in Hokkaido Prefecture, Japan

- Location within Japan
- Interactive map of Haboro Dam
- Location: Hokkaido Prefecture, Japan
- Coordinates: 44°20′37″N 141°55′36″E
- Construction began: 1959
- Opening date: 1966

Dam and spillways
- Height: 27.8 m (91 ft)
- Length: 108.4 m (356 ft)

Reservoir
- Total capacity: 3300 thousand cubic meters
- Catchment area: 16.2 sq. km
- Surface area: 32 hectares

Haboro Dam (Japanese: 羽幌ダム) is an earthfill dam located in Hokkaido Prefecture in Japan. The dam is used for irrigation. The catchment area of the dam is 16.2 km^{2}. The dam impounds about 32 ha of land when full and can store 3300 thousand cubic meters of water. The construction of the dam was started on 1959 and completed in 1966.
