= Horoshin Dam =

Dam in Hokkaido Prefecture, Japan

- Location within Japan
- Interactive map of Horoshin Dam
- Location: Hokkaido Prefecture, Japan
- Coordinates: 43°53′11″N 141°55′50″E
- Construction began: 1965
- Opening date: 1975

Dam and spillways
- Height: 27 m (89 ft)
- Length: 283.1 m (929 ft)

Reservoir
- Total capacity: 5705 thousand cubic meters
- Catchment area: 12.4 sq. km
- Surface area: 63 hectares

Horoshin Dam (Japanese: 幌新ダム) is an earthfill dam located in Hokkaido Prefecture in Japan. The dam is used for irrigation. The catchment area of the dam is 12.4 km^{2}. The dam impounds about 63 ha of land when full and can store 5705 thousand cubic meters of water. The construction of the dam was started on 1965 and completed in 1975.
