= Mikasabonbetsu Dam =

Dam in Hokkaido Prefecture, Japan

- Location within Japan
- Location: Hokkaido Prefecture, Japan
- Coordinates: 43°16′41″N 141°59′11″E
- Construction began: 1985
- Opening date: 2023

Dam and spillways
- Height: 53 m (174 ft)
- Length: 160 m (520 ft)

Reservoir
- Total capacity: 8620 thousand cubic meters
- Catchment area: 35.4 sq. km
- Surface area: 55 hectares

Mikasabonbetsu Dam (Japanese: 三笠ぽんべつダム) is a trapezoidal dam located in Hokkaido Prefecture in Japan. The dam is used for flood control. The catchment area of the dam is 35.4 km^{2}. The dam impounds about 55 ha of land when full and can store 8620 thousand cubic meters of water. The construction of the dam was started on 1985 and completed in 2023.
