= Kakkomi Dam =

Dam in Hokkaido Prefecture, Japan

- Location within Japan
- Interactive map of Kakkomi Dam
- Location: Hokkaido Prefecture, Japan
- Coordinates: 43°13′59″N 143°28′43″E
- Construction began: 1953
- Opening date: 1955

Dam and spillways
- Height: 34 m (112 ft)
- Length: 185 m (607 ft)

Reservoir
- Total capacity: 17410 thousand cubic meters
- Catchment area: 941.8 sq. km
- Surface area: 152 hectares

Kakkomi Dam (Japanese: 活込ダム) is a gravity dam located in Hokkaido Prefecture in Japan. The dam is used for power production. The catchment area of the dam is 941.8 km^{2}. The dam impounds about 152 ha of land when full and can store 17410 thousand cubic meters of water. The construction of the dam was started on 1953 and completed in 1955.
