= Takara-ike Dam =

Dam in Hokkaido Prefecture, Japan

- Location within Japan
- Location: Hokkaido Prefecture, Japan
- Coordinates: 43°11′22″N 141°50′03″E
- Opening date: 1925

Dam and spillways
- Height: 17.1 m (56 ft)
- Length: 158.8 m (521 ft)

Reservoir
- Total capacity: 1,014,000 m^{3} (35,800,000 cu ft)
- Catchment area: 6.1 km^{2} (2.4 sq mi)
- Surface area: 18 hectares (44 acres)

Takara-ike Dam (Japanese: 宝池) is an earthfill dam located in Hokkaido Prefecture in Japan. The dam is used for irrigation. The catchment area of the dam is 6.1 km^{2}. The dam impounds about 18 ha of land when full and can store 1014 thousand cubic meters of water. The construction of the dam was completed in 1925.
