= Furukawa Dam =

Dam in Hokkaido Prefecture, Japan

- Location within Japan
- Interactive map of Furukawa Dam
- Location: Hokkaido Prefecture, Japan
- Coordinates: 43°50′00″N 142°49′11″E
- Construction began: 1928
- Opening date: 1929

Dam and spillways
- Height: 23.9 m (78 ft)
- Length: 156.4 m (513 ft)

Reservoir
- Total capacity: 307 thousand cubic meters
- Catchment area: 569.8 sq. km
- Surface area: 4 hectares

Furukawa Dam (Japanese: 古川ダム) is a gravity dam located in Hokkaido Prefecture in Japan. The dam is used for power production. The catchment area of the dam is 569.8 km^{2}. The dam impounds about 4 ha of land when full and can store 307 thousand cubic meters of water. The construction of the dam was started on 1928 and completed in 1929.
