= Erumu Dam =

Dam in Hokkaido Prefecture, Japan

- Location within Japan
- Interactive map of Erumu Dam
- Location: Hokkaido Prefecture, Japan
- Coordinates: 43°36′31″N 142°4′53″E
- Construction began: 1974
- Opening date: 1997

Dam and spillways
- Height: 53.7 m (176 ft)
- Length: 258 m (846 ft)

Reservoir
- Total capacity: 3300 thousand cubic meters
- Catchment area: 7.3 sq. km
- Surface area: 27 hectares

Erumu Dam (Japanese: エルムダム) is a rockfill dam located in Hokkaido Prefecture in Japan. The dam is used for irrigation. The catchment area of the dam is 7.3 km^{2}. The dam impounds about 27 ha of land when full and can store 3300 thousand cubic meters of water. The construction of the dam was started on 1974 and completed in 1997.
