= Kawabata Dam =

Dam in Hokkaido Prefecture, Japan

- Location within Japan
- Interactive map of Kawabata Dam
- Location: Hokkaido Prefecture, Japan
- Coordinates: 42°54′41″N 141°54′58″E
- Construction began: 1954
- Opening date: 1962

Dam and spillways
- Height: 21.4 m (70 ft)
- Length: 280 m (920 ft)

Reservoir
- Total capacity: 6,479 thousand cubic meters
- Catchment area: 780 sq. km
- Surface area: 68 hectares

Kawabata Dam (Japanese: 川端ダム) is a gravity dam located in Hokkaido Prefecture in Japan. The dam is used for power production. The catchment area of the dam is 780 km^{2}. The dam impounds about 68 ha of land when full and can store 6,479 thousand cubic meters of water. The construction of the dam was started on 1954 and completed in 1962.
