= Wakka Dam =

Dam in Hokkaido Prefecture, Japan

- Location within Japan
- Location: Hokkaido Prefecture, Japan
- Coordinates: 43°37′15″N 141°42′16″E
- Opening date: 1925

Dam and spillways
- Height: 25.5 m (84 ft)
- Length: 172 m (564 ft)

Reservoir
- Total capacity: 881,000 m^{3} (31,100,000 cu ft)
- Catchment area: 3.4 km^{2} (1.3 sq mi)
- Surface area: 10 hectares (25 acres)

Wakka Dam (Japanese: 和歌ダム) is an earthfill dam located in Hokkaido Prefecture in Japan. The dam is used for irrigation. The catchment area of the dam is 3.4 km^{2}. The dam impounds about 10 ha of land when full and can store 881 thousand cubic meters of water. The construction of the dam was completed in 1925.
