= Asahi No.1 Dam =

Dam in Hokkaido Prefecture, Japan

- Location within Japan
- Interactive map of Asahi No.1 Dam
- Location: Hokkaido Prefecture, Japan
- Coordinates: 43°4′13″N 141°57′52″E
- Opening date: 1941

Dam and spillways
- Height: 21.5 m (71 ft)
- Length: 115 m (377 ft)

Reservoir
- Total capacity: 325 thousand cubic meters
- Catchment area: 7.7 sq. km
- Surface area: 5 hectares

Asahi No.1 Dam (Japanese: 旭町第一ダム) is a gravity dam located in Hokkaido Prefecture in Japan. The dam is used for water supply. The catchment area of the dam is 7.7 km^{2}. The dam impounds about 5 ha of land when full and can store 325 thousand cubic meters of water. The construction of the dam was completed in 1941.
