= Nanbuzaka Dam =

Dam in Hokkaido Prefecture, Japan

- Location within Japan
- Location: Hokkaido Prefecture, Japan
- Coordinates: 41°51′09″N 140°35′36″E
- Construction began: 1986
- Opening date: 2009

Dam and spillways
- Height: 26.1 m (86 ft)
- Length: 299 m (981 ft)

Reservoir
- Total capacity: 965 thousand cubic meters
- Catchment area: 12.7 sq. km
- Surface area: 13 hectares

Nanbuzaka Dam (Japanese: 南部坂ダム) is a rockfill dam located in Hokkaido Prefecture in Japan. The dam is used for flood control. The catchment area of the dam is 12.7 km^{2}. The dam impounds about 13 ha of land when full and can store 965 thousand cubic meters of water. The construction of the dam was started on 1986 and completed in 2009.
