= Fujisawa Dam =

Dam in Hokkaido Prefecture, Japan

- Location within Japan
- Interactive map of Fujisawa Dam
- Location: Hokkaido Prefecture, Japan
- Coordinates: 43°50′43″N 141°54′30″E
- Opening date: 1923

Dam and spillways
- Height: 17.5 m (57 ft)
- Length: 95 m (312 ft)

Reservoir
- Total capacity: 600 thousand cubic meters
- Catchment area: 3.5 sq. km
- Surface area: 13 hectares

Fujisawa Dam (Japanese: 藤沢ダム) is an earthfill dam located in Hokkaido Prefecture in Japan. The dam is used for irrigation. The catchment area of the dam is 3.5 km^{2}. The dam impounds about 13 ha of land when full and can store 600 thousand cubic meters of water. The construction of the dam was completed in 1923.
