= Nakahoro Dam =

Dam in Hokkaido Prefecture, Japan

- Location within Japan
- Location: Hokkaido Prefecture, Japan
- Coordinates: 43°55′37″N 141°45′16″E
- Construction began: 1971
- Opening date: 1990

Dam and spillways
- Height: 25.8 m (85 ft)
- Length: 123 m (404 ft)

Reservoir
- Total capacity: 2930 thousand cubic meters
- Catchment area: 17.5 sq. km
- Surface area: 48 hectares

Nakahoro Dam (Japanese: 中幌ダム) is an earthfill dam located in Hokkaido Prefecture in Japan. The dam is used for flood control. The catchment area of the dam is 17.5 km^{2}. The dam impounds about 48 ha of land when full and can store 2930 thousand cubic meters of water. The construction of the dam was started on 1971 and completed in 1990.
