= Nigorigawa Dam =

Dam in Hokkaido Prefecture, Japan

- Location within Japan
- Location: Hokkaido Prefecture, Japan
- Coordinates: 42°6′01″N 140°27′02″E
- Construction began: 1975
- Opening date: 2005

Dam and spillways
- Height: 42 m (138 ft)
- Length: 219 m (719 ft)

Reservoir
- Total capacity: 1048 thousand cubic meters
- Catchment area: 14.3 sq. km
- Surface area: 10 hectares

Nigorigawa Dam (Japanese: 濁川ダム) is a rockfill dam located in Hokkaido Prefecture in Japan. The dam is used for flood control. The catchment area of the dam is 14.3 km^{2}. The dam impounds about 10 ha of land when full and can store 1048 thousand cubic meters of water. The construction of the dam started in 1975 and was completed in 2005.
