= Nakanosawa Dam =

Dam in Hokkaido Prefecture, Japan

- Location within Japan
- Location: Hokkaido Prefecture, Japan
- Coordinates: 44°12′44″N 142°18′27″E
- Opening date: 1937

Dam and spillways
- Height: 15.2 m (50 ft)
- Length: 180 m (590 ft)

Reservoir
- Total capacity: 948 thousand cubic meters
- Catchment area: 10.2 sq. km
- Surface area: 16 hectares

Nakanosawa Dam (Japanese: 中の沢ダム) is an earthfill dam located in Hokkaido Prefecture in Japan. The dam is used for irrigation. The catchment area of the dam is 10.2 km^{2}. The dam impounds about 16 ha of land when full and can store 948 thousand cubic meters of water. The construction of the dam was completed in 1937.
