= Ainumanai Dam =

Dam in Hokkaido Prefecture, Japan

- Location within Japan
- Location: Hokkaido Prefecture, Japan
- Coordinates: 42°6′02″N 140°8′02″E
- Opening date: 1930

Dam and spillways
- Height: 25.3 m (83 ft)
- Length: 90.9 m (298 ft)

Reservoir
- Total capacity: 758 thousand cubic meters
- Catchment area: 22.1 sq. km
- Surface area: 27 hectares

Ainumanai Dam (Japanese: 相沼内ダム) is a gravity dam located in Hokkaido Prefecture in Japan. The dam is used for power production. The catchment area of the dam is 22.1 km^{2}. The dam impounds about 27 ha of land when full and can store 758 thousand cubic meters of water. The construction of the dam was completed in 1930.
