= Inada Dam =

Dam in Hokkaido Prefecture, Japan

- Location within Japan
- Interactive map of Inada Dam
- Location: Hokkaido Prefecture, Japan
- Coordinates: 43°38′42″N 142°0′35″E
- Opening date: 1979

Dam and spillways
- Height: 17.6 m (58 ft)
- Length: 220 m (720 ft)

Reservoir
- Total capacity: 410 thousand cubic meters
- Catchment area: 13 sq. km
- Surface area: 7 hectares

Inada Dam (Japanese: 稲田ダム) is an earthfill dam located in Hokkaido Prefecture in Japan. The dam is used for irrigation. The dam's catchment area is 13 km^{2}. The dam impounds about 7 ha of land when full and can store 410 thousand cubic meters of water. The dam was completed in 1979.
