= Kitasen Dam =

Dam in Hokkaido Prefecture, Japan

- Location within Japan
- Location: Hokkaido Prefecture, Japan
- Coordinates: 44°15′59″N 142°12′59″E
- Opening date: 1967

Dam and spillways
- Height: 18.3 m (60 ft)
- Length: 74 m (243 ft)

Reservoir
- Total capacity: 824 thousand cubic meters
- Catchment area: 9.5 sq. km
- Surface area: 13 hectares

Kitasen Dam (Japanese: 北線ダム) is a rockfill dam located in Hokkaido Prefecture in Japan. The dam is used for irrigation. The catchment area of the dam is 9.5 km^{2}. The dam impounds about 13 ha of land when full and can store 824 thousand cubic meters of water. The construction of the dam was completed in 1967.
