= Motogoya Dam =

Dam in Hokkaido Prefecture, Japan

- Location within Japan
- Location: Hokkaido Prefecture, Japan
- Coordinates: 43°20′44″N 143°16′02″E
- Opening date: 1960

Dam and spillways
- Height: 32 m (105 ft)
- Length: 86 m (282 ft)

Reservoir
- Total capacity: 2610 thousand cubic meters
- Catchment area: 408.8 sq. km
- Surface area: 27 hectares

Motogoya Dam (Japanese: 元小屋ダム) is a gravity dam located in Hokkaido Prefecture in Japan. The dam is used for power production. The catchment area of the dam is 408.8 km^{2}. The dam impounds about 27 ha of land when full and can store 2610 thousand cubic meters of water. The construction of the dam was and completed in 1960.
