= Nuclear power in Japan =

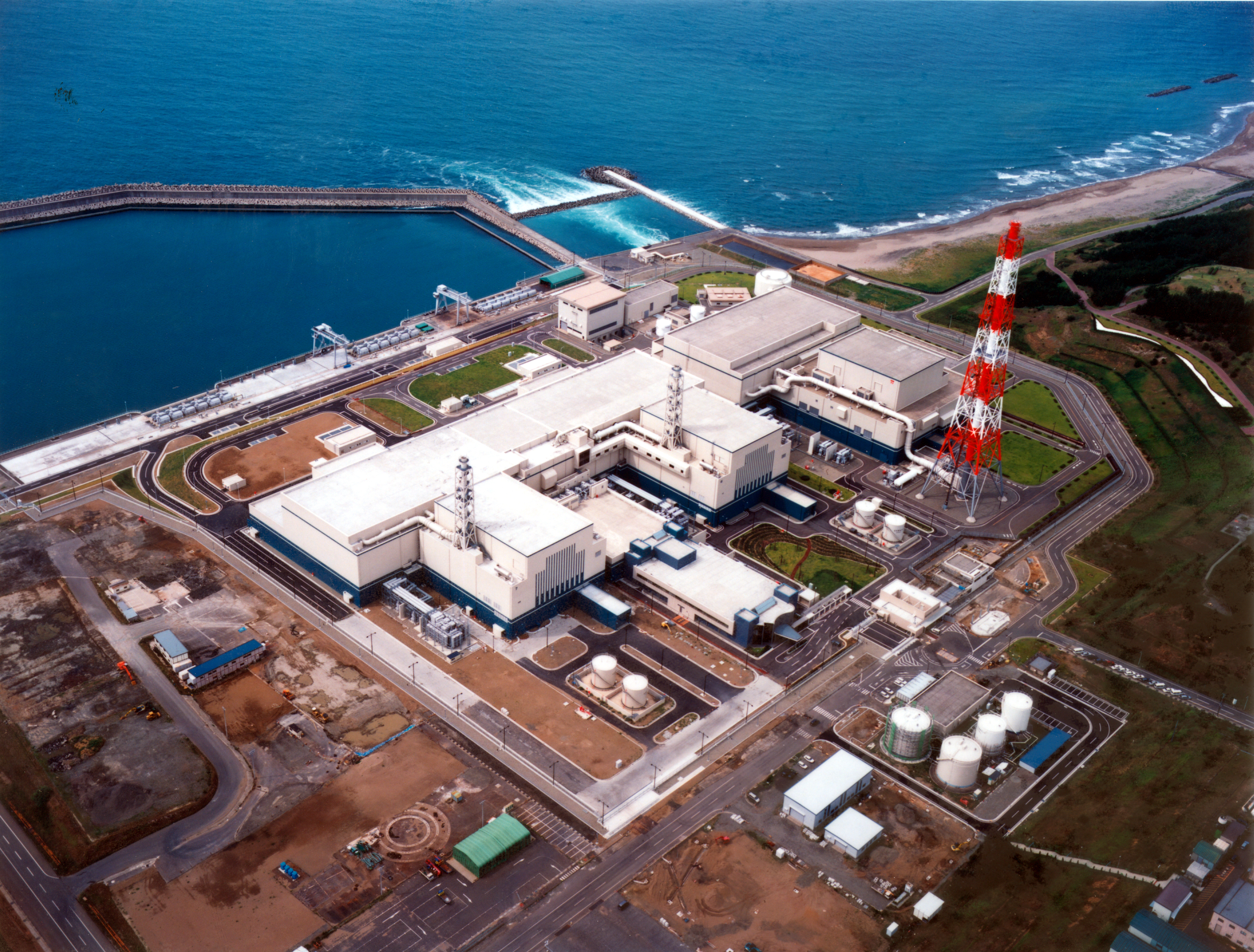
The Kashiwazaki-Kariwa Nuclear Power Plant, a nuclear plant with seven units, the largest single nuclear power station in the world

Japan started using nuclear power for electricity generation in 1966, and it generated approximately a third of the country's electrical power before the Fukushima accident in 2011. After a near-nationwide shutdown following the accident, the share has recovered to 9% in 2025.

The country's nuclear power industry was heavily influenced by the Fukushima accident, caused by the 2011 Tōhoku earthquake and tsunami. After the Fukushima accident, all reactors were shut down temporarily. As of November 2024, of the 54 nuclear reactors present in Japan before 2011, there were 33 operable reactors but only 13 reactors in 6 power plants were actually operating. A total of 24 reactors are scheduled for decommissioning or are in the process of being decommissioned. Others are in the process of being reactivated, or are undergoing modifications aimed at improving resiliency against natural disasters; Japan's 2030 energy goals posit that at least 33 will be reactivated by a later date.

The Fukushima accident hardened attitudes toward nuclear power. In June 2011, immediately after the accident, more than 80% of Japanese said they were anti-nuclear and distrusted government information on radiation, but ten years later, in March 2021, only 11 percent of Japanese said they wanted that nuclear energy generation to be discontinued immediately. Another 49 percent were asking for a gradual exit from nuclear energy. In February 2023, a survey by Asahi Shimbun showed that 51% of participants in Japan favored the restart of nuclear plant operations, with 42% opposed.

== History ==
=== Early years ===
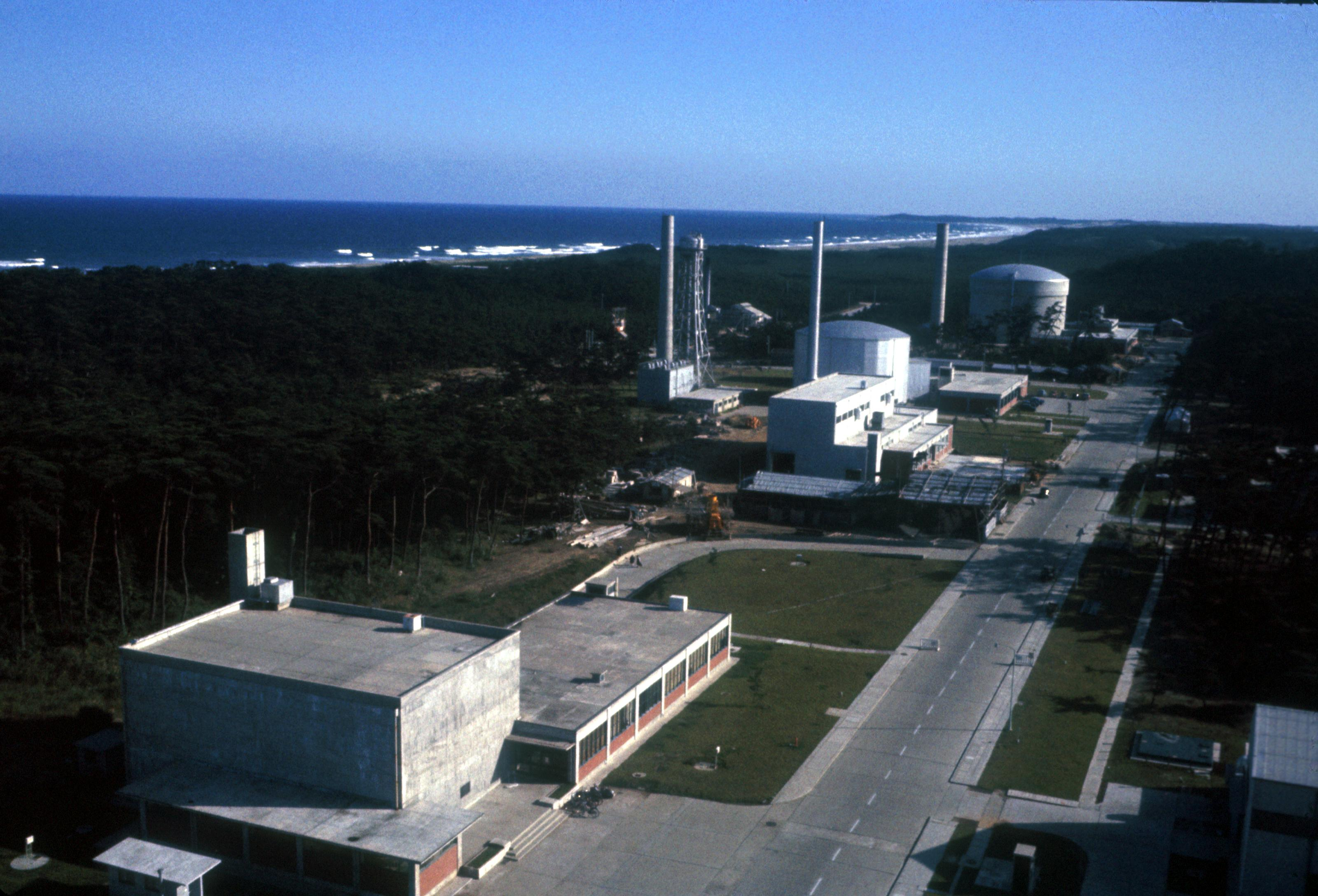
Three experimental reactors installed in Tōkai, Ibaraki, played key roles in the early development of nuclear power in Japan: from left to right, JRR-1 (1957), JRR-2 (1960), and JRR-3 (1962).

Japan's nuclear development began in the 1930s with the Japanese nuclear weapons program. After the war, the United States imposed a total ban on nuclear research during the post-war occupation of Japan.

Following the December 1953 Atoms for Peace speech at the UN General Assembly by U.S. President Eisenhower, future Prime Minister Yasuhiro Nakasone and his peers from the Kaishintō Party (a forerunner to the Liberal Democratic Party) drafted a 235-million-yen budget (the amount symbolically referencing uranium-235). Members of the National Diet took part in the 1955 Geneva Conference on the Peaceful Uses of Atomic Energy and drafted legislation governing Japan's nuclear program.

Around the same time, the Atomic Energy Act of 1954 was enacted in America, and Japan received condensed uranium from the country in 1955. Two experimental reactors, JRR-1 (built by North American Aviation's nuclear division) and JRR-2 (largely based on Chicago Pile-5), were constructed. A much more powerful experimental reactor JRR-3 was completed in 1962 by a consortium led by Hitachi, the first experimental reactor to be fully designed and built in Japan. Also in 1955, Nakasone's group drafted the Atomic Energy Basic Law, which was enacted in Japan to promote nuclear power while limiting activities strictly to peaceful purposes. The Japanese Atomic Energy Commission was established as a regulatory body, with its first chair, Matsutarō Shōriki, a newspaper magnate, also being a key promoter of nuclear power in Japan.

A prototype nuclear power station, JPDR, began power generation on 26 October 1963. Japan's first commercial nuclear power plant, the Tōkai Nuclear Power Plant, was built using main components imported from the General Electric Company in the UK and was connected to the grid on 25 July 1966. This reactor remains the only Magnox reactor ever built on Japanese soil. In 1969, the first nuclear-powered ship in Japan (and the fourth in the world), Mutsu, was launched by Mitsubishi Heavy Industries (reactor) and IHI (hull).

==== Light water reactors ====
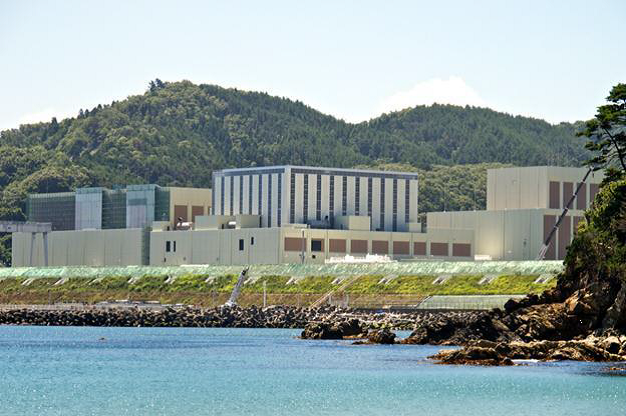
The Onagawa Nuclear Power Plant, a 3-unit BWR site typical of Japan's nuclear plants.

General Electric offered light water reactors at a discounted price as soon as Yasuhiro Nakasone, then the Minister of Science and Technology, began revising the country's nuclear power strategy in 1961. This offer was accepted, and Tsuruga-1 was commissioned in March 1970 as Japan's first BWR. GE teamed up with Hitachi and Toshiba to build BWRs, while Westinghouse collaborated with Mitsubishi Heavy Industries (MHI) to promote PWRs. By the late 1970s, these companies began constructing plants independently. All nuclear reactors built in Japan have been either BWRs or PWRs, with Hitachi and Toshiba (which later acquired Westinghouse's nuclear division to build PWRs as well) still responsible for the former and MHI for the latter.

Developments in nuclear power since that time have seen contributions from Japanese companies and research institutes on the same level as the other major users of nuclear power. From the early 1970s to the present, the Japanese government promoted the siting of nuclear power plants through a variety of policy instruments involving soft social control and financial incentives.

=== Later years ===
Japan's nuclear industry was not hit as hard by the effects of the Three Mile Island accident (TMI) or the Chernobyl disaster as some other countries. Construction of new plants remained strong throughout the 1980s and 1990s. While many new plants had been proposed, all were subsequently canceled or never brought past initial planning. Cancelled plant orders include:

- The Hōhoku Nuclear Power Plant at Hōhoku, Yamaguchi – 1994
- The Kushima Nuclear Power Plant at Kushima, Miyazaki – 1997
- The Ashihama Nuclear Power Plant at Ashihama, Mie – 2000 (the first Project at the site in the 1970s was completed at Hamaoka as Unit 1&2)
- The Maki Nuclear Power Plant at Maki, Niigata (Kambara) – Canceled in 2003
- The Suzu Nuclear Power Plant at Suzu, Ishikawa – 2003

Starting in the mid-1990s, there were several nuclear-related accidents and cover-ups in Japan that eroded public perception of the industry, resulting in protests and resistance to new plants. These accidents included the Tokaimura nuclear accident, the Mihama steam explosion, cover-ups after an accident at the Monju reactor, among others, more recently the Chūetsu offshore earthquake aftermath. While exact details may be in dispute, it is clear that the safety culture in Japan's nuclear industry has come under greater scrutiny.

=== 2000s ===
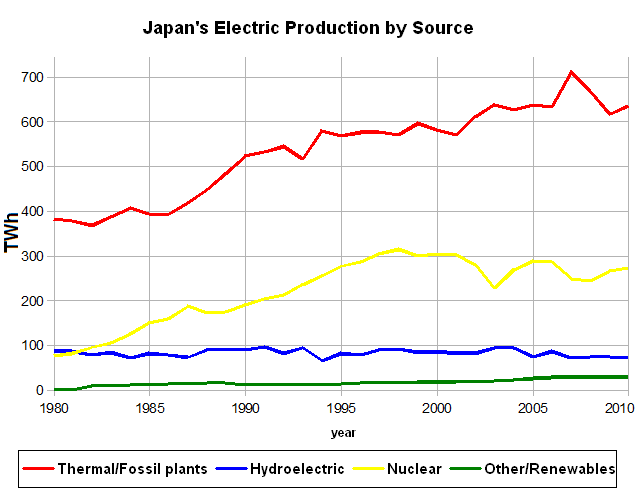
Up to 2011, Japan had steadily increased its nuclear generation over time. A dip in 2003 was due to TEPCO data falsification scandals in 2002 and caused a poor operating record.

On 18 April 2007, Japan and the United States signed the United States-Japan Joint Nuclear Energy Action Plan, aimed at putting in place a framework for the joint research and development of nuclear energy technology.

Each country will conduct research into fast reactor technology, fuel cycle technology, advanced computer simulation and modeling, small and medium reactors, safeguards and physical protection; and nuclear waste management. In March 2008, Tokyo Electric Power Company announced that the start of operation of four new nuclear power reactors would be postponed by one year due to the incorporation of new earthquake resistance assessments. Units 7 and 8 of the Fukushima Daiichi plant would now enter commercial operation in October 2014 and October 2015, respectively. Unit 1 of the Higashidori plant is now scheduled to begin operating in December 2015, while unit 2 will start up in 2018 at the earliest. As of September 2008, Japanese ministries and agencies were seeking an increase in the 2009 budget by 6%. The total requested comes to 491.4 billion Japanese yen (US$4.6 billion), and the focuses of research are the development of the fast breeder reactor cycle, next-generation light water reactors, the Iter project, and seismic safety.

=== Fukushima accident and aftermath ===
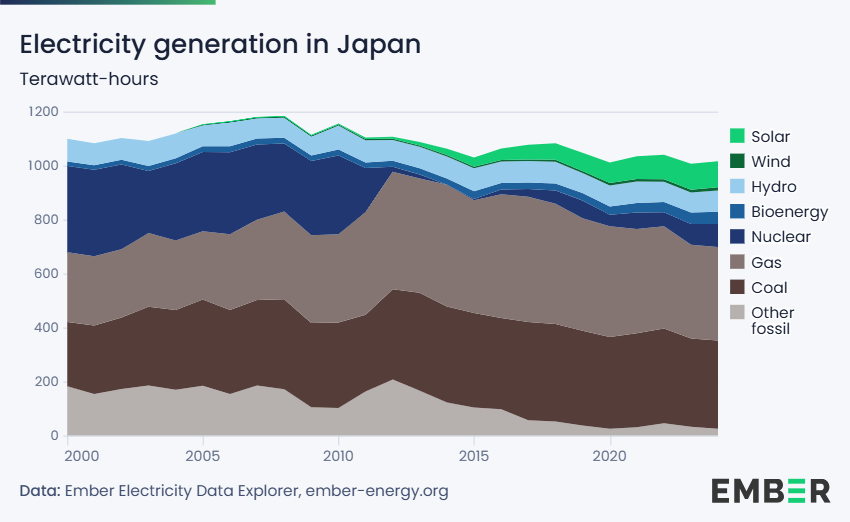
The use of nuclear power (in dark blue) in Japan declined significantly after the Fukushima accident.

An energy white paper, approved by the Japanese Cabinet in October 2011, says "public confidence in the safety of nuclear power was greatly damaged" by the Fukushima accident in March 2011, and calls for a reduction in the nation's reliance on nuclear power. It also omits a section on nuclear power expansion that was in the previous year's policy review. Nuclear Safety Commission Chairman Haruki Madarame told a parliamentary inquiry in February 2012 that "Japan's atomic safety rules are inferior to global standards and left the country unprepared for the Fukushima nuclear disaster last March". There were flaws in, and lax enforcement of, the safety rules governing Japanese nuclear power companies, and this included insufficient protection against tsunamis.

On 6 May 2011, Prime Minister Naoto Kan ordered the Hamaoka Nuclear Power Plant to be shut down as an earthquake of magnitude 8.0 or higher is likely to hit the area within the next thirty years.

As of 27 March 2012, Japan had only one out of 54 nuclear reactors operating; the Tomari-3, after the Kashiwazaki-Kariwa 6 was shut down. The Tomari-3 was shut down for maintenance on 5 May, leaving Japan with no nuclear-derived electricity for the first time since 1970, when the country's then-only two reactors were taken offline for five days for maintenance. On 15 June 2012, approval was given to restart Ōi Units 3 and 4 which could take six weeks to bring them to full operation. On 1 July 2012, unit 3 of the Ōi Nuclear Power Plant was restarted. This reactor can provide 1,180 MW of electricity. On 21 July 2012 unit 4 was restarted, also 1,180 MW. The reactor was shut down again on 14 September 2013, again leaving Japan with no operating power reactors.

Global status of nuclear deployment as of 2023 Operating reactors, building new reactors Operating reactors, planning new build No reactors, building new reactors No reactors, new in planning Operating reactors, stable Operating reactors, decided on phase-out Civil nuclear power is illegal No reactors

Government figures in the 2014 Annual Report on Energy show that Japan depended on imported fossil fuels for 88% of its electricity in fiscal year 2013, compared with 62% in fiscal 2010. Without significant nuclear power, the country was self-sufficient for just 6% of its energy demand in 2012, compared with 20% in 2010. The additional fuel costs to compensate for its nuclear reactors being idled was ¥3.6 trillion. In parallel, domestic energy users have seen a 19.4% increase in their energy bills between 2010 and 2013, while industrial users have seen their costs rise 28.4% over the same period.

In 2018 the Japanese government revised its energy plan to update the 2030 target for nuclear energy to 20%-22% of power generation by restarting reactors, compared to LNG 27%, coal 25%, renewables 23% and oil 3%. This would reduce Japan's carbon dioxide emissions by 26% compared to 2013, and increase self-sufficiency to about 24% by 2030, compared to 8% in 2016.

Since the Fukushima nuclear accident, Japan has restarted twelve reactors and fifteen more have applied to restart, including two that are under construction. Amid the Russian invasion of Ukraine, Japan's Prime Minister announced the restart of nine units by winter 2022 and seven more by summer 2023.

==== Investigations on the Fukushima accident ====
The National Diet of Japan Fukushima Nuclear Accident Independent Investigation Commission (NAIIC) is the first independent investigation commission by the National Diet in the 66-year history of Japan's constitutional government. NAICC was established on 8 December 2011 with the mission to investigate the direct and indirect causes of the Fukushima nuclear accident. NAICC submitted its inquiry report to both houses on 5 July 2012. (Note: The startpage of the Fukushima Nuclear Accident Independent Investigation Commission internetsite stated on 10 July 2012 the following information which was used as the basis for the previous sentences: "NAIIC (The National Diet of Japan Fukushima Nuclear Accident Independent Investigation Commission) is the first independent investigation commission by the National Diet in the 66-year history of Japan’s constitutional government. NAICC was established on 8 December 2011 with the mission to investigate the direct and indirect causes of the Fukushima nuclear incident. NAICC submitted its inquiry report to both houses on 5 July 2012.")

The 10-member commission compiled its report based on more than 1,167 interviews and 900 hours of hearings. It was a six-month independent investigation, the first of its kind with wide-ranging subpoena powers in Japan's constitutional history, which held public hearings with former Prime Minister Naoto Kan and Tokyo Electric Power Co's former president Masataka Shimizu, who gave conflicting accounts of the disaster response. The commission chairman, Kiyoshi Kurokawa, declared with respect to the Fukushima nuclear incident: "It was a profoundly man-made disaster – that could and should have been foreseen and prevented." He added that the "fundamental causes" of the disaster were rooted in "the ingrained conventions of Japanese culture." The report outlines errors and willful negligence at the plant before the 2011 Tōhoku earthquake and tsunami on 11 March 2011 and a flawed response in the hours, days, and weeks that followed. It also offers recommendations and encourages Japan's parliament to "thoroughly debate and deliberate" the suggestions.

=== Post-Fukushima nuclear policy ===
Japan's nuclear power reactors Timeline [ view/edit ]

Japan's new energy plan, approved by the Liberal Democratic Party cabinet in April 2014, calls nuclear power "the country's most important power source". Reversing a decision by the previous Democratic Party, the government will re-open nuclear plants, aiming for "a realistic and balanced energy structure". In May 2014 the Fukui District Court blocked the restart of the Oi reactors. In April 2015 courts blocked the restarting of two reactors at the Takahama Nuclear Power Plant but permitted the restart of two reactors at the Sendai Nuclear Power Plant. The government hopes that nuclear power will produce 20% of Japan's electricity by 2030.

As of June 2015, approval was being sought from the new Nuclear Regulatory Agency for 24 units to restart, of the 54 pre-Fukushima units. The units also have to be approved by the local prefecture authorities before restarting.

In July 2015 fuel loading was completed at the Sendai-1 nuclear plant, it restarted 11 August 2015 and was followed by unit 2 on 1 November 2015. Japan's Nuclear Regulatory Authority approved the restart of Ikata-3 which took place on 19 April 2016, this reactor is the fifth to receive approval to restart. The Takahama Nuclear Power Plant unit 4 restarted in May 2017 and unit 3 in June 2017. And by 2023, Unit 1 and 2 of Takahama also restarted.

In November 2016 Japan signed a nuclear cooperation agreement with India. Japanese nuclear plant builders saw this as potential lifeline given that domestic orders had ended following the Fukushima disaster, and India is proposing to build about 20 new reactors over the next decade. However, there is Japanese domestic opposition to the agreement, as India has not agreed to the Treaty on the Non-Proliferation of Nuclear Weapons.

In 2014, following the failure of the prototype Monju sodium-cooled fast reactor, Japan agreed to cooperate in developing the French ASTRID demonstration sodium-cooled fast breeder reactor. As of 2016, France was seeking the full involvement of Japan in the ASTRID development.

In 2015, the Agency for Natural Resources and Energy changed the accounting provisions of the Electricity Business Act, so companies can account for decommissioning costs in ten yearly installments rather than a one-time charge. This will encourage the decommissioning of older and smaller nuclear units, most of which have not restarted since 2011.

In 2022, during the global energy crisis which greatly increased the cost of imported fossil fuels, Japan's prime minister announced the building of safer next-generation nuclear reactors and restarting idle existing plants would be considered. In 2022 ten reactors were operational producing about 5% of Japan's electricity.

In December 2022, Japan's Nuclear Regulation Authority (NRA) approved a draft-rule allowing nuclear reactors to operate beyond 60 years by excluding inspection downtimes. This was part of a policy at enhancing nuclear reactor use, including restarting many, extending older units' lives, and developing new reactor technologies. In February 2023, the cabinet approved this policy and the construction of new reactors. By May 2023, a law was enacted to officially omit shutdown periods from the 60-year limit, subject to the economy minister's approval. The law also required the NRA to perform inspections every 10 years for reactors over 30 years of operation.

== Seismicity ==
Japan has had a long history of earthquakes and seismic activity, and destructive earthquakes, often resulting in tsunamis, occur several times a century. Due to this, concern has been expressed about the particular risks of constructing and operating nuclear power plants in Japan. Amory Lovins has said: "An earthquake-and-tsunami zone crowded with 127 million people is an unwise place for 54 reactors". To date, the most serious seismic-related accident has been the Fukushima Daiichi nuclear disaster, following the 2011 Tōhoku earthquake and tsunami.

Professor Katsuhiko Ishibashi, one of the seismologists who have taken an active interest in the topic, coined the term genpatsu-shinsai (原発震災), from the Japanese words for "nuclear power" and "quake disaster" to express the potential worst-case catastrophe that could ensue. Dr Kiyoo Mogi, former chair of the Japanese Coordinating Committee for Earthquake Prediction, has expressed similar concerns, stating in 2004 that the issue 'is a critical problem which can bring a catastrophe to Japan through a man-made disaster'.

Warnings from Kunihiko Shimazaki, a professor of seismology at the University of Tokyo, were also ignored. In 2004, as a member of an influential cabinet office committee on offshore earthquakes, Mr. Shimazaki "warned that Fukushima's coast was vulnerable to tsunamis more than twice as tall as the forecasts of as much as five meters put forth by regulators and Tokyo Electric". Minutes of the meeting on 19 February 2004, show that the government bureaucrats running the committee moved quickly to exclude his views from the committee's final report. He said the committee did not want to force Tokyo Electric to make expensive upgrades at the plant.

Hidekatsu Yoshii, a member of the House of Representatives for the Japanese Communist Party and an anti-nuclear campaigner, warned in March and October 2006 about the possibility of the severe damage that might be caused by a tsunami or earthquake. During a parliamentary committee in May 2010 he made similar claims, warning that the cooling systems of a Japanese nuclear plant could be destroyed by a landslide or earthquake. In response, Yoshinobu Terasaka, head of the Nuclear and Industrial Safety Agency, replied that the plants were so well designed that "such a situation is practically impossible". Following damage at the Kashiwazaki-Kariwa Nuclear Power Plant due to the 2007 Chūetsu offshore earthquake, Kiyoo Mogi called for the immediate closure of the Hamaoka Nuclear Power Plant, which was knowingly built close to the centre of the expected Tōkai earthquake. Katsuhiko Ishibashi previously claimed, in 2004, that Hamaoka was "considered to be the most dangerous nuclear power plant in Japan".

The International Atomic Energy Agency (IAEA) has also expressed concern. At a meeting of the G8's Nuclear Safety and Security Group, held in Tokyo in 2008, an IAEA expert warned that a strong earthquake with a magnitude above 7.0 could pose a 'serious problem' for Japan's nuclear power stations. Before Fukushima, "14 lawsuits charging that risks had been ignored or hidden were filed in Japan, revealing a disturbing pattern in which operators underestimated or hid seismic dangers to avoid costly upgrades and keep operating. But all the lawsuits were unsuccessful". Underscoring the risks facing Japan, a 2012 research institute investigation has "determined there is a 70% chance of a magnitude-7 earthquake striking the Tokyo metropolitan area within the next four years, and 98% over 30 years". The March 2011 earthquake was a magnitude 9.

=== Design standards ===
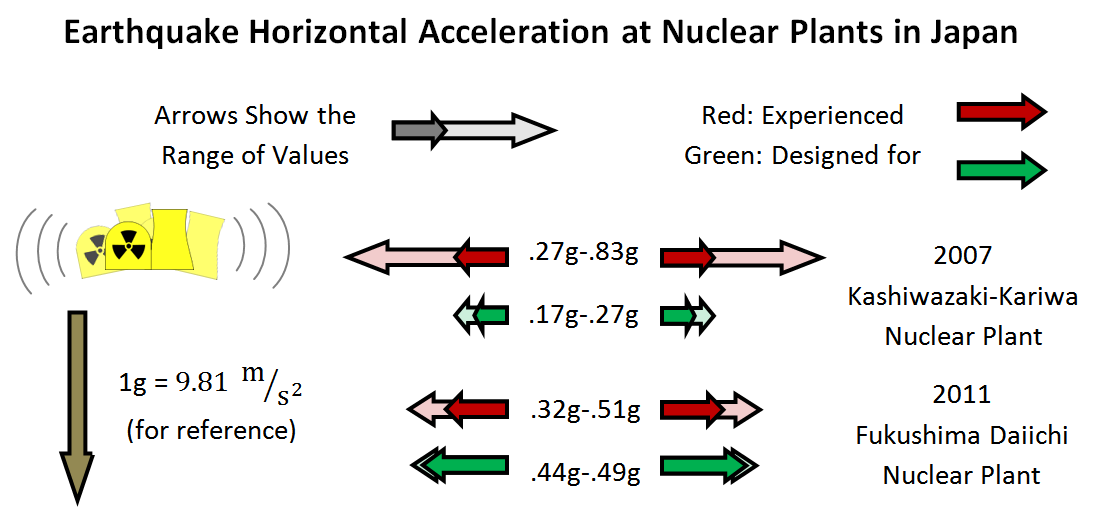
Horizontal acceleration experienced and design values during the 2007 and 2011 major earthquake and earthquake-tsunami events.

Between 2005 and 2007, three Japanese nuclear power plants were shaken by earthquakes that far exceeded the maximum peak ground acceleration used in their design. The tsunami that followed the 2011 Tōhoku earthquake, inundating the Fukushima I Nuclear Power Plant, was more than twice the design height, while the ground acceleration also slightly exceeded the design parameters.

In 2006 a Japanese government subcommittee was charged with revising the national guidelines on the earthquake-resistance of nuclear power plants, which had last been partially revised in 2001, resulting in the publication of a new seismic guide – the 2006 Regulatory Guide for Reviewing Seismic Design of Nuclear Power Reactor Facilities. The subcommittee membership included Professor Ishibashi, however his proposal that the standards for surveying active faults should be reviewed was rejected and he resigned at the final meeting, claiming that the review process was 'unscientific' and the outcome rigged to suit the interests of the Japan Electric Association, which had 11 of its committee members on the 19-member government subcommittee. Ishibashi has subsequently claimed that, although the new guide brought in the most far-reaching changes since 1978, it was 'seriously flawed' because it underestimated the design basis of earthquake ground motion. He has also claimed that the enforcement system is 'a shambles' and questioned the independence of the Nuclear Safety Commission after a senior Nuclear and Industrial Safety Agency official appeared to rule out a new review of the NSC's seismic design guide in 2007.

Following the publication of the new 2006 Seismic Guide, the Nuclear and Industrial Safety Agency, at the request of the Nuclear Safety Commission, required the design of all existing nuclear power plants to be re-evaluated.

=== Geological surveys ===
The standard of geological survey work in Japan is another area causing concern. In 2008 Taku Komatsubara, a geologist at the National Institute of Advanced Industrial Science and Technology alleged that the presence of active faults was deliberately ignored when surveys of potential new power plant sites were undertaken, a view supported by a former topographer. Takashi Nakata, a seismologist from the Hiroshima Institute of Technology has made similar allegations and suggests that conflicts of interest between the Japanese nuclear industry and the regulators contribute to the problem.

A 2011 Natural Resources Defense Council report that evaluated the seismic hazard to reactors worldwide, as determined by the Global Seismic Hazard Assessment Program data, placed 35 of Japan's reactors in the group of 48 reactors worldwide in very high and high seismic hazard areas.

== Nuclear power plants ==
As of January 2022 there are 33 operable reactors in Japan, of which 12 reactors are currently operating. Additionally, 5 reactors have been approved for restart and further 8 have restart applications under review.

Station	Unit	Type	Model	Capacity (MW)	Operable capacity (MW)	Location	Status
Fugen		HWLWR	ATR	148	—N/a	Tsuruga, Fukui 35°45′16″N 136°00′59″E	Decommissioned
Fukushima Daiichi	1	BWR	BWR-3	439	—N/a	Ōkuma and Futaba, Fukushima 37°25′17″N 141°01′57″E	To be decommissioned
Fukushima Daiichi	2	BWR	BWR-4	760	—N/a	Ōkuma and Futaba, Fukushima 37°25′17″N 141°01′57″E	To be decommissioned
Fukushima Daiichi	3	BWR	BWR-4	760	—N/a	Ōkuma and Futaba, Fukushima 37°25′17″N 141°01′57″E	To be decommissioned
Fukushima Daiichi	4	BWR	BWR-4	760	—N/a	Ōkuma and Futaba, Fukushima 37°25′17″N 141°01′57″E	To be decommissioned
Fukushima Daiichi	5	BWR	BWR-4	760	—N/a	Ōkuma and Futaba, Fukushima 37°25′17″N 141°01′57″E	To be decommissioned
Fukushima Daiichi	6	BWR	BWR-5	1067	—N/a	Ōkuma and Futaba, Fukushima 37°25′17″N 141°01′57″E	To be decommissioned
Fukushima Daini	1	BWR	BWR-5	1067	4,400	Naraha and Tomioka, Fukushima 37°19′10″N 141°01′16″E	To be decommissioned
Fukushima Daini	2	BWR	BWR-5	1067	4,400	Naraha and Tomioka, Fukushima 37°19′10″N 141°01′16″E	To be decommissioned
Fukushima Daini	3	BWR	BWR-5	1067	4,400	Naraha and Tomioka, Fukushima 37°19′10″N 141°01′16″E	To be decommissioned
Fukushima Daini	4	BWR	BWR-5	1067	4,400	Naraha and Tomioka, Fukushima 37°19′10″N 141°01′16″E	To be decommissioned
Genkai	1	PWR	Mitsubishi (2-loop)	529	2,919	Higashimatsuura, Saga 33°30′56″N 129°50′14″E	To be decommissioned
Genkai	2	PWR	Mitsubishi (2-loop)	529	2,919	Higashimatsuura, Saga 33°30′56″N 129°50′14″E	Suspended
Genkai	3	PWR	Mitsubishi (4-loop)	1127	2,919	Higashimatsuura, Saga 33°30′56″N 129°50′14″E	Operational
Genkai	4	PWR	Mitsubishi (4-loop)	1127	2,919	Higashimatsuura, Saga 33°30′56″N 129°50′14″E	Operational
Hamaoka	1	BWR	BWR-4	515	3,504	Omaezaki, Shizuoka 34°37′25″N 138°08′33″E	To be decommissioned
Hamaoka	2	BWR	BWR-4	806	3,504	Omaezaki, Shizuoka 34°37′25″N 138°08′33″E	To be decommissioned
Hamaoka	3	BWR	BWR-5	1056	3,504	Omaezaki, Shizuoka 34°37′25″N 138°08′33″E	Suspended
Hamaoka	4	BWR	BWR-5	1092	3,504	Omaezaki, Shizuoka 34°37′25″N 138°08′33″E	Suspended
Hamaoka	5	BWR	BWR-5	1325	3,504	Omaezaki, Shizuoka 34°37′25″N 138°08′33″E	Suspended
Higashidōri (Tōhoku)	1	BWR	BWR-5	1067	1,100	Higashidōri, Aomori 41°11′17″N 141°23′25″E	Suspended
Higashidōri (Tokyo)	1	BWR	ABWR	1350	1,100	Higashidōri, Aomori 41°11′17″N 141°23′25″E	Unfinished; restart planned
Ikata	1	PWR	Mitsubishi (2-loop)	538	890	Nishiuwa, Ehime 33°29′27″N 132°18′41″E	To be decommissioned
Ikata	2	PWR	Mitsubishi (2-loop)	538	890	Nishiuwa, Ehime 33°29′27″N 132°18′41″E	To be decommissioned
Ikata	3	PWR	Mitsubishi (3-loop)	846	890	Nishiuwa, Ehime 33°29′27″N 132°18′41″E	Operational
Kashiwazaki-Kariwa	1	BWR	BWR-5	1067	8,212	Kashiwazaki and Kariwa, Niigata 37°25′42″N 138°36′06″E	Suspended
Kashiwazaki-Kariwa	2	BWR	BWR-5	1067	8,212	Kashiwazaki and Kariwa, Niigata 37°25′42″N 138°36′06″E	Suspended
Kashiwazaki-Kariwa	3	BWR	BWR-5	1067	8,212	Kashiwazaki and Kariwa, Niigata 37°25′42″N 138°36′06″E	Suspended
Kashiwazaki-Kariwa	4	BWR	BWR-5	1067	8,212	Kashiwazaki and Kariwa, Niigata 37°25′42″N 138°36′06″E	Suspended
Kashiwazaki-Kariwa	5	BWR	BWR-5	1067	8,212	Kashiwazaki and Kariwa, Niigata 37°25′42″N 138°36′06″E	Suspended
Kashiwazaki-Kariwa	6	BWR	ABWR	1315	8,212	Kashiwazaki and Kariwa, Niigata 37°25′42″N 138°36′06″E	Operational
Kashiwazaki-Kariwa	7	BWR	ABWR	1315	8,212	Kashiwazaki and Kariwa, Niigata 37°25′42″N 138°36′06″E	Suspended
Maki					—N/a	Maki, Niigata 37°25′17″N 141°01′57″E	Withdrawn
Mihama	1	PWR	Mitsubishi (2-loop)	320	780	Mihama, Fukui 35°42′09″N 135°57′48″E	To be decommissioned
Mihama	2	PWR	Mitsubishi (2-loop)	470	780	Mihama, Fukui 35°42′09″N 135°57′48″E	To be decommissioned
Mihama	3	PWR	Mitsubishi (3-loop)	780	780	Mihama, Fukui 35°42′09″N 135°57′48″E	Operational
Monju		FBR	2	246	—N/a	Tsuruga, Fukui 35°44′25″N 135°59′17″E	To be decommissioned
Namie-Odaka					—N/a	Minamisōma and Namie, Fukushima 37°30′48.2″N 141°02′03.1″E	Withdrawn
Ōi	1	PWR	Westinghouse (4-loop)	1120	2,254	Ōi, Fukui 37°30′48.2″N 141°02′03.1″E	To be decommissioned
Ōi	2	PWR	Westinghouse (4-loop)	1120	2,254	Ōi, Fukui 37°30′48.2″N 141°02′03.1″E	To be decommissioned
Ōi	3	PWR	Mitsubishi (4-loop)	1127	2,254	Ōi, Fukui 37°30′48.2″N 141°02′03.1″E	Operational
Ōi	4	PWR	Mitsubishi (4-loop)	1127	2,254	Ōi, Fukui 37°30′48.2″N 141°02′03.1″E	Operational
Ōma	1	BWR	ABWR	1315	1,383	Ōma, Aomori 41°30′35″N 140°54′37″E	Under construction
Onagawa	1	BWR	BWR-4	498	2,174	Oshika and Ishinomaki, Miyagi 38°24′04″N 141°29′59″E	To be decommissioned
Onagawa	2	BWR	BWR-5	796	2,174	Oshika and Ishinomaki, Miyagi 38°24′04″N 141°29′59″E	Operational
Onagawa	3	BWR	BWR-5	796	2,174	Oshika and Ishinomaki, Miyagi 38°24′04″N 141°29′59″E	Suspended
Sendai	1	PWR	Mitsubishi (3-loop)	846	1,780	Satsumasendai, Kagoshima 31°50′01″N 130°11′23″E	Operational
Sendai	2	PWR	Mitsubishi (3-loop)	846	1,780	Satsumasendai, Kagoshima 31°50′01″N 130°11′23″E	Operational
Shika	1	BWR	BWR-5	505	1,898	Shika, Ishikawa 37°03′40″N 136°43′35″E	Suspended
Shika	2	BWR	ABWR	1108	1,898	Shika, Ishikawa 37°03′40″N 136°43′35″E	Suspended
Shimane	1	BWR	BWR-3	439	820	Matsue, Shimane 35°32′18″N 132°59′57″E	To be decommissioned
Shimane	2	BWR	BWR-5	789	820	Matsue, Shimane 35°32′18″N 132°59′57″E	Operational
Shimane	3	BWR	ABWR	1325	820	Matsue, Shimane 35°32′18″N 132°59′57″E	Under construction
Takahama	1	PWR	Mitsubishi (3-loop)	780	3,304	Takahama, Fukui 35°31′20″N 135°30′17″E	Operational
Takahama	2	PWR	Mitsubishi (3-loop)	780	3,304	Takahama, Fukui 35°31′20″N 135°30′17″E	Operational
Takahama	3	PWR	Mitsubishi (3-loop)	830	3,304	Takahama, Fukui 35°31′20″N 135°30′17″E	Operational
Takahama	4	PWR	Mitsubishi (3-loop)	830	3,304	Takahama, Fukui 35°31′20″N 135°30′17″E	Operational
Tōkai	1	GCR	Magnox	137	1,100	Tōkai, Ibaraki 36°27′59″N 140°36′24″E	Decommissioned
Tōkai	2	BWR	BWR-5	1060	1,100	Tōkai, Ibaraki 36°27′59″N 140°36′24″E	Suspended
Tomari	1	PWR	Mitsubishi (2-loop)	550	2,070	Tomari, Hokkaido 43°02′10″N 140°30′45″E	Suspended
Tomari	2	PWR	Mitsubishi (2-loop)	550	2,070	Tomari, Hokkaido 43°02′10″N 140°30′45″E	Suspended
Tomari	3	PWR	Mitsubishi (3-loop)	866	2,070	Tomari, Hokkaido 43°02′10″N 140°30′45″E	Suspended
Tsuruga	1	BWR	BWR-2	340	1,160	Tsuruga, Fukui 35°40′22″N 136°04′38″E	To be decommissioned
Tsuruga	2	PWR	Mitsubishi (4-loop)	1108	1,160	Tsuruga, Fukui 35°40′22″N 136°04′38″E	Suspended
Total					39,748		

Nuclear power plants in Japan (view)
Active plants
Inactive plants
Cancelled plants
Decommissioned plants
Planned plants

== Nuclear accidents ==
In terms of consequences of radioactivity releases and core damage, the Fukushima I nuclear accidents in 2011 were the worst experienced by the Japanese nuclear industry, in addition to ranking among the worst civilian nuclear accidents, though no fatalities were caused and no serious exposure of radiation to workers occurred. The Tokaimura reprocessing plant fire in 1999 had 2 worker deaths, one more was exposed to radiation levels above legal limits, and over 660 others received detectable radiation doses but within permissible levels, well below the threshold to affect human health. The Mihama Nuclear Power Plant experienced a steam explosion in one of the turbine buildings in 2004 where five workers were killed and six injured.

=== 2011 accidents ===
A map showing epicenter of earthquake and position of nuclear power plants

There have been many nuclear shutdowns, failures, and three partial meltdowns which were triggered by the 2011 Tōhoku earthquake and tsunami.

Plant description	Accident descriptions
Fukushima Daiichi Nuclear Power Plant	Fukushima Daiichi nuclear disaster; Timeline of the Fukushima Daiichi nuclear disaster
Fukushima II Nuclear Power Plant	Fukushima II nuclear accidents
Onagawa Nuclear Power Plant	Onagawa Nuclear Power Plant incidents
Tōkai Nuclear Power Plant	Tōkai Nuclear Power Plant incidents
Rokkasho Reprocessing Plant	Rokkasho Reprocessing Plant incidents

=== Fukushima Daiichi nuclear disaster ===
According to the Federation of Electric Power Companies of Japan, "by April 27 approximately 55 percent of the fuel in reactor unit 1 had melted, along with 35 percent of the fuel in unit 2, and 30 percent of the fuel in unit 3; and overheated spent fuels in the storage pools of units 3 and 4 probably were also damaged". The accident exceeds the 1979 Three Mile Island accident in seriousness, and is comparable to the 1986 Chernobyl disaster. The Economist reports that the Fukushima disaster is "a bit like three Three Mile Islands in a row, with added damage in the spent-fuel stores", and that there will be ongoing impacts:

Years of clean-up will drag into decades. A permanent exclusion zone could end up stretching beyond the plant’s perimeter. Seriously exposed workers may be at increased risk of cancers for the rest of their lives...

On 24 March 2011, Japanese officials announced that "radioactive iodine-131 exceeding safety limits for infants had been detected at 18 water-purification plants in Tokyo and five other prefectures". Officials said also that the fallout from the Dai-ichi plant is "hindering search efforts for victims from the March 11 earthquake and tsunami".

Problems in stabilizing the Fukushima Daiichi nuclear power plant have hardened attitudes to nuclear power. As of June 2011, "more than 80 percent of Japanese now say they are anti-nuclear and distrust government information on radiation". The ongoing Fukushima crisis may spell the end of nuclear power in Japan, as "citizen opposition grows and local authorities refuse permission to restart reactors that have undergone safety checks". Local authorities are skeptical that sufficient safety measures have been taken and are reticent to give their permission – now required by law – to bring suspended nuclear reactors back online.

Two government advisers have said that "Japan's safety review of nuclear reactors after the Fukushima disaster is based on faulty criteria and many people involved have conflicts of interest". Hiromitsu Ino, Professor Emeritus at the University of Tokyo, says "The whole process being undertaken is exactly the same as that used previous to the Fukushima Dai-Ichi accident, even though the accident showed all these guidelines and categories to be insufficient".

In 2012, former prime minister Naoto Kan was interviewed about the Fukushima nuclear disaster, and has said that at one point Japan faced a situation where there was a chance that people might not be able to live in the capital zone including Tokyo and would have to evacuate. He says he is haunted by the specter of an even bigger nuclear crisis forcing tens of millions of people to flee Tokyo and threatening the nation's existence. "If things had reached that level, not only would the public have had to face hardships but Japan's very existence would have been in peril". That convinced Kan to "declare the need for Japan to end its reliance on atomic power and promote renewable sources of energy such solar that have long taken a back seat in the resource-poor country's energy mix".

=== Other accidents ===
Other accidents of note include:

- 1981: Almost 300 workers were exposed to excessive levels of radiation after a fuel rod ruptured during repairs at the Tsuruga Nuclear Power Plant.
- December 1995: The fast breeder Monju Nuclear Power Plant sodium leak. State-run operator Donen was found to have concealed videotape footage that showed extensive damage to the reactor.
- March 1997: The Tokaimura nuclear reprocessing plant fire and explosion, northeast of Tokyo. 37 workers were exposed to low doses of radiation. Donen later acknowledged it had initially suppressed information about the fire.
- 1999: A fuel loading system malfunctioned at a nuclear plant in the Fukui Prefecture and set off an uncontrolled nuclear reaction and explosion.
- September 1999: The criticality accident at the Tokai fuel fabrication facility. Hundreds of people were exposed to radiation, three workers received doses above legal limits of whom two later died.
- 2000: Three TEPCO executives were forced to quit after the company in 1989 ordered an employee to edit out footage showing cracks in nuclear plant steam pipes in video being submitted to regulators.
- August 2002: a widespread falsification scandal starting in that led to the shut down of all Tokyo Electric Power Company’s 17 nuclear reactors; Tokyo Electric's officials had falsified inspection records and attempted to hide cracks in reactor vessel shrouds in 13 of its 17 units.
- 2002: Two workers were exposed to a small amount of radiation and suffered minor burns during a fire at Onagawa Nuclear Power Station in northern Japan.
- 2006: A small amount of radioactive steam was released at the Fukushima Dai-ichi plant and it escaped the compound.
- 16 July 2007: A severe earthquake (measuring 6.6 on the moment magnitude scale) hit the region where Tokyo Electric's Kashiwazaki-Kariwa Nuclear Power Plant is located and radioactive water spilled into the Sea of Japan; as of March 2009, all of the reactors remain shut down for damage verification and repairs; the plant with seven units was the largest single nuclear power station in the world.

== Nuclear waste disposal ==
Japanese policy is to reprocess its spent nuclear fuel. Originally spent fuel was reprocessed under contract in England and France, but then the Rokkasho Reprocessing Plant was built, with operations originally expected to commence in 2007. The policy to use recovered plutonium as mixed oxide (MOX) reactor fuel was questioned on economic grounds, and in 2004 it was revealed the Ministry of Economy, Trade and Industry had covered up a 1994 report indicating reprocessing spent fuel would cost four times as much as burying it.

In 2000, a Specified Radioactive Waste Final Disposal Act called for creation of a new organization to manage high level radioactive waste, and later that year the Nuclear Waste Management Organization of Japan (NUMO) was established under the jurisdiction of the Ministry of Economy, Trade and Industry. NUMO is responsible for selecting a permanent deep geological repository site, construction, operation and closure of the facility for waste emplacement by 2040. Site selection began in 2002 and application information was sent to 3,239 municipalities, but by 2006, no local government had volunteered to host the facility. Kōchi Prefecture showed interest in 2007, but its mayor resigned due to local opposition. In December 2013 the government decided to identify suitable candidate areas before approaching municipalities.

In 2014 the head of the Science Council of Japan’s expert panel has said Japan's seismic conditions makes it difficult to predict ground conditions over the necessary 100,000 years, so it will be impossible to convince the public of the safety of deep geological disposal.

The cost of MOX fuel had roughly quadrupled from 1999 to 2017, creating doubts about the economics of nuclear fuel reprocessing. In 2018 the Japanese Atomic Energy Commission updated plutonium guidelines to try to reduce plutonium stockpiles, stipulating that the Rokkasho Reprocessing Plant should only produce the amount of plutonium required for MOX fuel for Japan's nuclear power plants.

== Nuclear regulatory bodies in Japan ==
- Nuclear Regulation Authority – A nuclear safety agency under the environment ministry, created on 19 September 2012. It replaced the Nuclear and Industrial Safety Agency and the Nuclear Safety Commission.
- Japanese Atomic Energy Commission (AEC) 原子力委員会 – Now operating as a commission of inquiry to the Japanese cabinet, this organization coordinates the entire nation's plans in the area of nuclear energy.
- Nuclear Safety Commission 原子力安全委員会 – The former Japanese regulatory body for the nuclear industry.
- Nuclear and Industrial Safety Agency (NISA) 原子力安全・保安院 – A former agency that performed regulatory activities and was formed on 6 January 2001, after a reorganization of governmental agencies.

== Nuclear power companies ==
=== Electric utilities running nuclear plants ===
Japan is divided into a number of regions that each get electric service from their respective regional provider, all utilities hold a monopoly and are strictly regulated by the Japanese government. For more background information, see Energy in Japan. All regional utilities in Japan currently operate nuclear plants with the exception of the Okinawa Electric Power Company. They are also all members of the Federation of Electric Power Companies (FEPCO) industry organization. The companies are listed below.

- Regional electric providers

- Hokkaidō Electric Power Company (HEPCO) - 北海道電力
- Tōhoku Electric Power Company (Tōhoku Electric) - 東北電力
- Tokyo Electric Power Company (TEPCO) - 東京電力
- Chūbu Electric Power Company (CHUDEN) - 中部電力
- Hokuriku Electric Power Company (RIKUDEN) - 北陸電力
- Kansai Electric Power Company (KEPCO) - 関西電力
- Chūgoku Electric Power Company (Energia) - 中国電力
- Shikoku Electric Power Company (YONDEN) - 四国電力
- Kyūshū Electric Power Company (Kyūshū Electric) - 九州電力

- Other companies with a stake in nuclear power

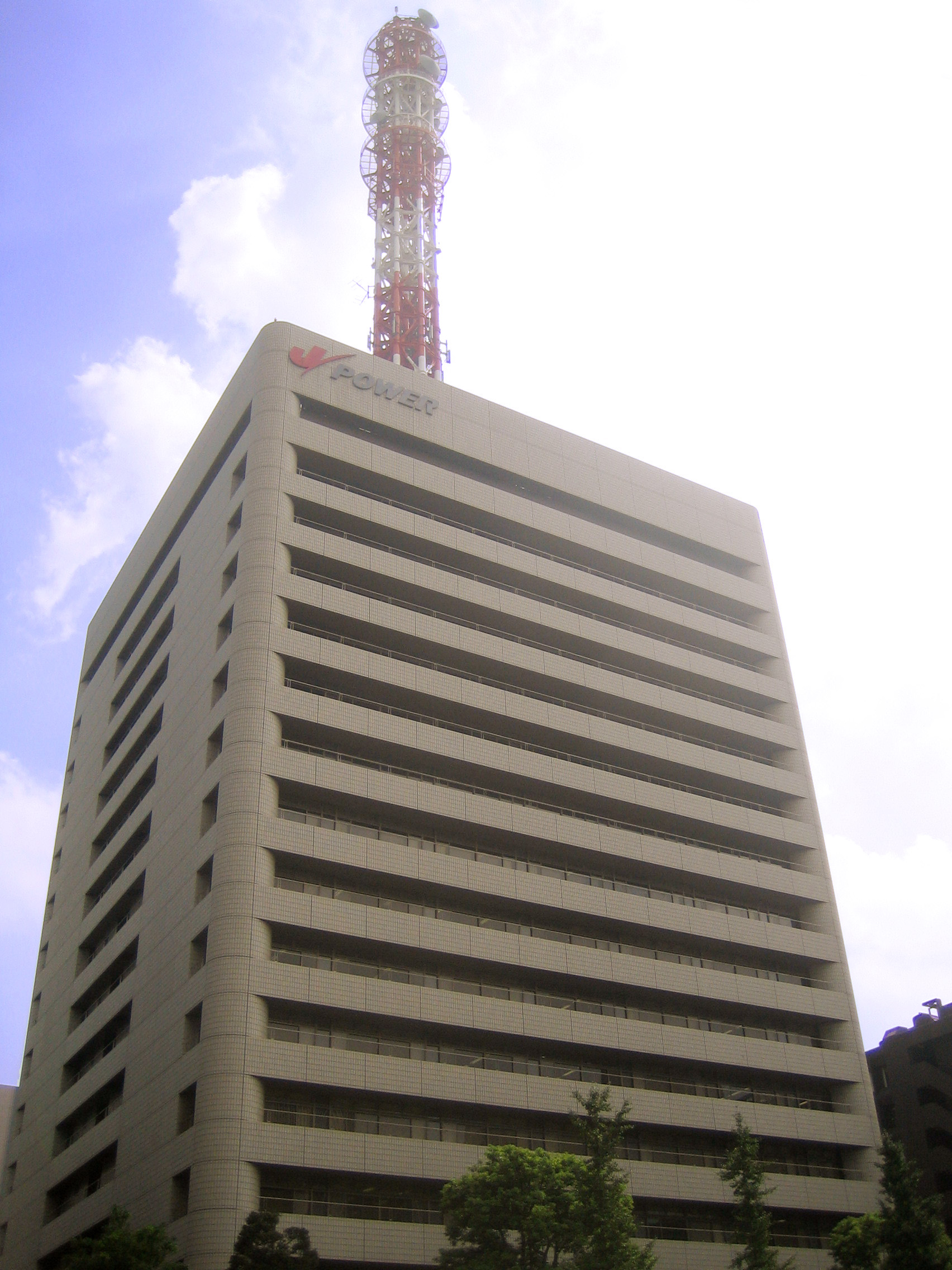
The headquarters of Electric Power Development, or J-Power, whose activities are specially directed towards R&D on new power sources.

- Japan Atomic Energy Agency (JAEA) - 日本原子力研究開発機構
- Japan Atomic Power Company (JPAC) - 日本原子力発電

JAPC, jointly owned by several Japan's major electric utilities, was created by special provisions from the Japanese government to be the first company in Japan to run a nuclear plant. Today it still operates two separate sites.

- Electric Power Development Company (EDPC, J-POWER) - 電源開発

This company was created by a special law after the end of World War II, it operates a number of coal fired, hydroelectric, and wind power plants, the Ohma nuclear plant that is under construction will mark its entrance to the industry upon completion.

=== Nuclear vendors and fuel cycle companies ===
Nuclear vendors provide fuel in its fabricated form, ready to be loaded in the reactor, nuclear services, and/or manage construction of new nuclear plants. The following is an incomplete list of companies based in Japan that provide such services. The companies listed here provide fuel or services for commercial light water plants, and in addition to this, JAEA has a small MOX fuel fabrication plant. Japan operates a robust nuclear fuel cycle.

- Nuclear Fuel Industries (NFI) - 原子燃料工業 NFI operates nuclear fuel fabrication plants in both Kumatori, Osaka and in Tōkai, Ibaraki, fabricating 284 and 200 (respectively) metric tons Uranium per year. The Tōkai site produces BWR, HTR, and ATR fuel while the Kumatori site produces only PWR fuel.
- Japan Nuclear Fuel Limited (JNFL, JNF) - 日本原燃 The shareholders of JNFL are the Japanese utilities. JNFL plans to open a full scale enrichment facility in Rokkasho, Aomori with a capacity of 1.5 million SWU/yr along with a MOX fuel fabrication facility. JNFL has also operated a nuclear fuel fabrication facility called Kurihama Nuclear Fuel Plant in Yokosuka, Kanagawa as GNF, producing BWR fuel.
- Mitsubishi Heavy Industries / Atmea - 三菱重工業 原子力事業本部 MHI operates a fuel manufacturing plant in Tōkai, Ibaraki, and contributes many heavy industry components to construction of new nuclear plants, and has recently designed its own APWR plant type, fuel fabrication has been completely PWR fuel, though MHI sells components to BWRs as well. It was selected by the Japanese government to develop fast breeder reactor technology and formed Mitsubishi FBR Systems. MHI has also announced an alliance with Areva to form a new company called Atmea.
- Global Nuclear Fuel (GNF). GNF was formed as a joint venture with GE Nuclear Energy (GENE), Hitachi, and Toshiba on 1 January 2000. GENE has since strengthened its relationship with Hitachi, forming a global nuclear alliance:
- GE Vernova Hitachi Nuclear Energy (GVH) - 日立GEベルノバニュークリア・エナジー This company was formed 1 July 2007. Its next generation reactor, the ESBWR, has made significant progress with US regulators. Its predecessor design, the ABWR, has been approved by the UK regulator for construction in the UK, following successful completion of the generic design assessment (GDA) process in 2017.
- Toshiba - 東芝 電力システム社 原子力事業部 Toshiba has maintained a large nuclear business focused mostly on Boiling Water Reactors. With the purchase of the American Westinghouse by US$5.4 Billion in 2006, which is focused mainly on Pressurized Water Reactor technology, it increased the size of its nuclear business about twofold. On 29 March 2017 Toshiba placed Westinghouse in Chapter 11 bankruptcy because of $9 billion of losses from its nuclear reactor construction projects, mostly the construction of four AP1000 reactors in the U.S. Toshiba still has a profitable maintenance and nuclear fuel supply business in Japan, and is a significant contractor in the Fukushima clean-up.
- Recyclable-Fuel Storage Co. A company formed by TEPCO and Japan Atomic Power Co. to build a spent nuclear fuel storage facility in Aomori Prefecture.

There have been discussions between Hitachi, Mitsubishi Heavy Industries and Toshiba about possibly consolidating some of their nuclear activities.

== Nuclear research and professional organizations in Japan ==
=== Research organizations ===
These organizations are government-funded research organizations, though many of them have special status to give them power of administration separate from the Japanese government. Their origins date back to the Atomic Energy Basic Law, but they have been reorganized several times since their inception.

- Japan Atomic Energy Research Institute (JAERI) - 日本原子力研究所 The original nuclear energy research organization established by the Japanese government under cooperation with U.S. partners.
- Atomic Fuel Corporation - 原子燃料公社 This organization was formed along with JAERI under the Atomic Energy Basic Law and was later reorganized to be PNC.
- Power Reactor and Nuclear Fuel Development Corporation (PNC) - Succeeded the AFC in 1967 in order to perform more direct construction of experimental nuclear plants, and was renamed JNC in 1998.
- Japan Nuclear Cycle Development Institute (JNC) - 核燃料サイクル開発機構 (semi-governmental agency) Was formed in 1998 as the direct successor to the PNC. This organization operated Lojo and Monju experimental and demonstration reactors.
- Japan Atomic Energy Agency (JAEA) - 日本原子力研究開発機構 This is the modern, currently operating primary nuclear research organization in Japan. It was formed by a merger of JAERI and JNC in 2005.

=== Academic/professional organizations ===
- Japan Atomic Industrial Forum (JAIF) 日本原子力産業協会 is a non-profit organization, established in 1956 to promote the peaceful use of atomic energy.
- The Atomic Energy Society of Japan (AESJ) 日本原子力学会 is a major academic organization in Japan focusing on all forms of nuclear power. The Journal of Nuclear Science and Technology is the academic journal run by the AESJ. It publishes English and Japanese articles, though most submissions are from Japanese research institutes, universities, and companies.
- Japan Nuclear Technology Institute (JANTI) 日本原子力技術協会 was established to by the nuclear power industry to support and lead that industry.
- Japan Electric Association (JEA) 日本電気協会 develops and publishes codes and guides for the Japanese nuclear power industry and is active in promoting nuclear power.

=== Other proprietary organizations ===
- JCO. Established in 1978 as by Sumimoto Metal Mining Co. this company did work with Uranium conversion and set up factories at the Tokai-mura site. Later, it was held solely responsible for the Tokaimura nuclear accident

== Anti-nuclear movement ==
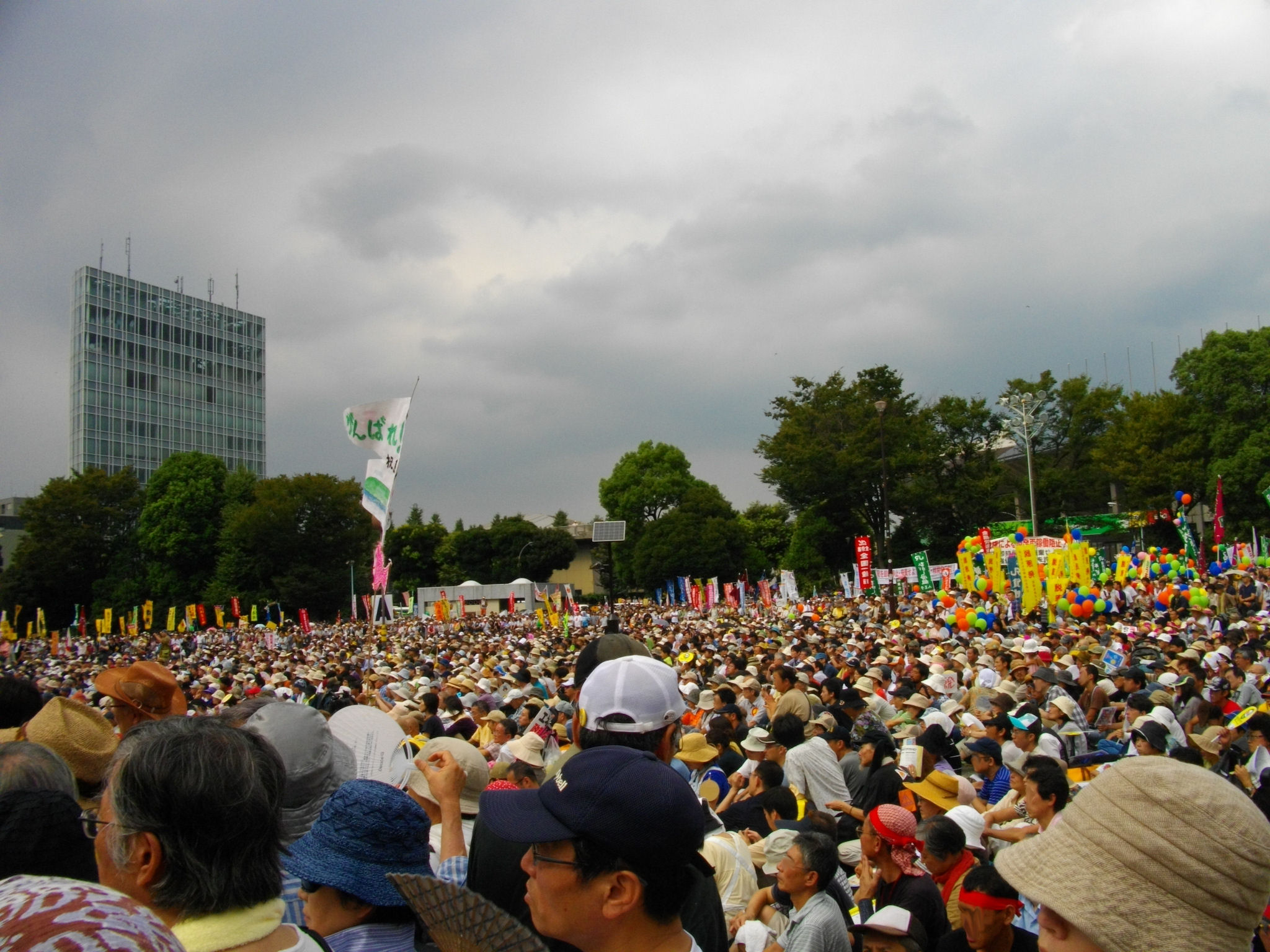
Anti-Nuclear Power Plant Rally on 19 September 2011 at Meiji Shrine complex in Tokyo. Sixty thousand people marched chanting "Sayonara nuclear power" and waving banners, to call on Japan's government to abandon nuclear power, following the Fukushima disaster.

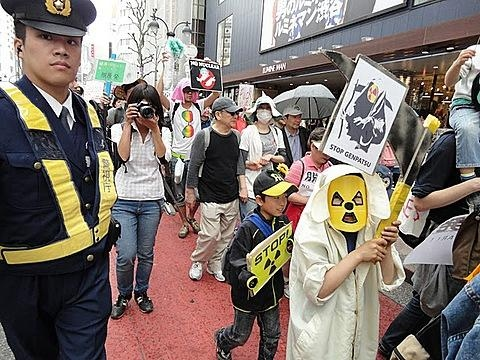
Peaceful anti-nuclear protest in Tokyo, Japan, escorted by policemen, 16 April 2011.

Long one of the world's most committed promoters of civilian nuclear power, Japan's nuclear industry was not hit as hard by the effects of the 1979 Three Mile Island accident (USA) or the 1986 Chernobyl disaster (USSR) as some other countries. Construction of new plants continued to be strong through the 1980s and into the 1990s. However, starting in the mid-1990s there were several nuclear related accidents and cover-ups in Japan that eroded public perception of the industry, resulting in protests and resistance to new plants. These accidents included the Tokaimura nuclear accident, the Mihama steam explosion, cover-ups after accidents at the Monju reactor, and more recently the Kashiwazaki-Kariwa Nuclear Power Plant was completely shut down for 21 months following an earthquake in 2007. While exact details may be in dispute, it is clear that the safety culture in Japan's nuclear industry has come under greater scrutiny.

The negative impact of the 2011 Fukushima nuclear disaster has changed attitudes in Japan. Political and energy experts describe "nothing short of a nationwide loss of faith, not only in Japan’s once-vaunted nuclear technology but also in the government, which many blame for allowing the accident to happen". Sixty thousand people marched in central Tokyo on 19 September 2011, chanting "Sayonara nuclear power" and waving banners, to call on Japan's government to abandon nuclear power, following the Fukushima disaster. Bishop of Osaka, Michael Goro Matsuura, has called on the solidarity of Christians worldwide to support this anti-nuclear campaign. In July 2012, 75,000 people gathered near in Tokyo for the capital's largest anti-nuclear event. Organizers and participants said such demonstrations signal a fundamental change in attitudes in a nation where relatively few have been willing to engage in political protests since the 1960s.

Anti-nuclear groups include the Citizens' Nuclear Information Center, Stop Rokkasho, Hidankyo, Sayonara Nuclear Power Plants, Women from Fukushima Against Nukes, and the Article 9 group. People associated with the anti-nuclear movement include: Jinzaburo Takagi, Haruki Murakami, Kenzaburō Ōe, Nobuto Hosaka, Mizuho Fukushima, Ryuichi Sakamoto and Tetsunari Iida.

== See also ==
- Energy in Japan
- Environmental issues in Japan
- Nuclear Regulation Authority
- Japan's non-nuclear weapons policy
- Japanese nuclear weapon program
- United States-Japan Joint Nuclear Energy Action Plan
