= Shōriki =

Shōriki is a surname. Notable people with the surname include:

- Matsutarō Shōriki (1885–1965), Japanese baseball entrepreneur
- Tōru Shōriki (1918–2011), Japanese baseball team owner
