= Japan nuclear =

Japan nuclear may refer to:

- 2011 Japanese nuclear accidents
- Japanese nuclear incidents
- Nuclear power in Japan
- Japanese nuclear weapon program

== See also ==
- Japan's non-nuclear weapons policy
