= Japan Atomic Energy Agency =

Japanese Atomic Energy Company

Coordinates: 36°26′33.7″N 140°35′45.1″E

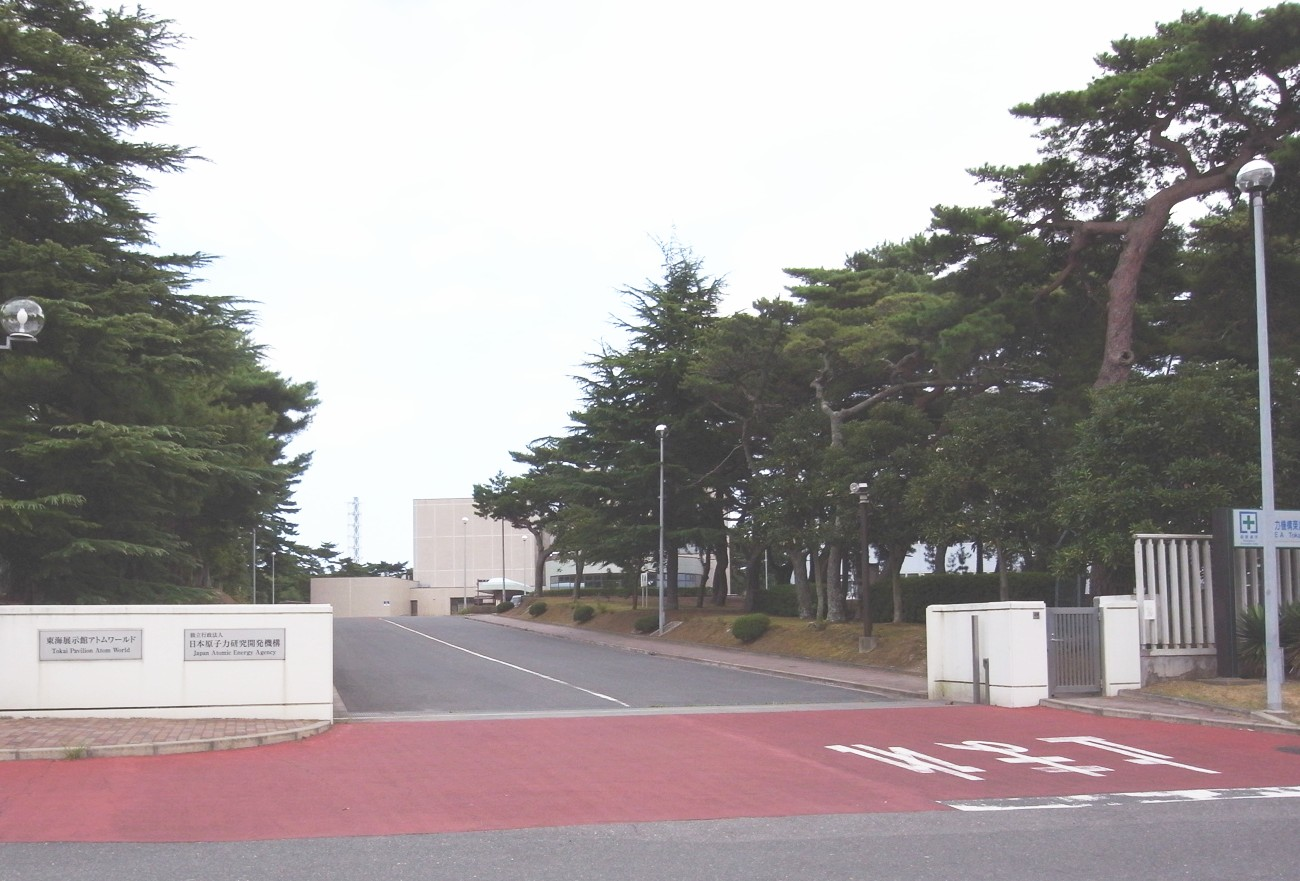
Headquarters of the Japan Atomic Energy Agency

The Japan Atomic Energy Agency is a Japanese atomic energy company. While it inherited the activities of both JNC and JAERI, it also inherited the nickname of JAERI, "Genken" 原研, an abbreviated word for "nuclear research".

On April 10, 2007, JAEA officially joined the GNEP alliance. The other members in the alliance are Areva, Washington Group International and BWX. It is expected that the experience gained from the Rokkasho centrifuge enrichment plant will be a key contribution from JAEA.

On April 1, 2016, JAEA transferred some of its laboratories to the National Institute of Radiological Sciences (NIRS), and the NIRS body was renamed to the National Institutes for Quantum and Radiological Science and Technology (QST) which includes existing laboratories of the NIRS.

In 2018 JAEA estimated it would need about 1.9 trillion yen ($17.1 billion) to decommission 79 facilities over 70 years.

== Overview ==
- Establishment: October 2005
- Founding Law: The Japan Atomic Energy Agency Law (日本原子力研究開発機構法)
- Headquarters: Tokai-mura
- Permanent Staff: 4386 people as of October 2005
- Board Chairman: 岡﨑俊雄 Inaugurated January 2007

== Locations and facilities ==
The following is an incomplete list of its activities, sorted by location:

=== Tokai-mura facilities ===
JAEA has several facilities located in Tōkai, Ibaraki Prefecture, which was the first center in Japan for nuclear research. Currently, JAEA has expanded to several other sites in the Ibaraki Prefecture as well as all of Japan.

- Tokai R&D Center (東海研究開発センター)
  - Nuclear Science Research Institute (原子力科学研究所)
  - Nuclear Fuel Cycle Engineering Laboratories (核燃料サイクル工学研究所)
- The Japan Proton Accelerator Research Complex (大強度陽子加速器計画 or J-PARC for short) houses many particle research facilities.

=== Tsuruga facilities ===
JAEA has another head base in Tsuruga, Fukui Prefecture. It is a fast breeder reactor center and a Research and Development (R&D) center.

=== Oarai R&D Center (大洗研究開発センター) ===
This center is located in Ōarai, Ibaraki Prefecture, close to, but not at the same site as Tokai-mura. It houses the Jōyō reactor, the Japan Materials Testing Reactor, the new High-temperature engineering test reactor, an environmental reactivity monitoring center, and a children's museum.

=== Ningyo-toge Environmental Engineering Center (人形峠環境技術センター) ===
This is a small uranium refining and conversion plant, as well as a small centrifuge enrichment demonstration plant located in Kamisaibara, Okayama Prefecture. The center deals with front-end issues of the nuclear fuel cycle.

=== Aomori R&D Center (青森研究開発センター) ===
The Aomori Research and Development Center is spread out over Rokkasho, Aomori Prefecture and Mutsu, Aomori Prefecture. The Rokkasho site does work with fusion research, notably a fusion reactor design research institute, a particle accelerator, and a materials irradiation test facility. The facilities in Mutsu include a museum, an ocean monitoring facility, and radioactive waste management.

JAEA also co-operates and provides support for the activities of Japan Nuclear Fuel Limited with their reprocessing facility and Uranium enrichment facility plans.

=== Horonobe Underground Research Center (幌延深地層研究センター) ===
The Horonobe URL carries out research and development on geoscientific study and on geological disposal for high-level radioactive waste. It is expected that this site will become Japan's national Deep geological repository for nuclear waste.

- Fugen

=== Tono Geoscience Center (東濃地科学センター) ===
This is located in Tōnō, Gifu Prefecture.

== See also ==
- 2011 Japanese nuclear accidents
- Fukushima I nuclear accidents
- Independent Administrative Institution
- Japanese nuclear incidents
- Japanese reaction to Fukushima I nuclear accidents
- List of Independent Administrative Institutions (Japan)
- Nuclear power in Japan
