= Nuclear Safety Commission =

Nuclear Safety Commissions are governmental nuclear power and materials watchdogs and may refer to:

- Canadian Nuclear Safety Commission
- Japanese Nuclear Safety Commission, replaced by Nuclear Regulation Authority in 2012
- Nuclear Safety Commission (Taiwan)
