= Japanese Atomic Energy Commission =

The Atomic Energy Commission of Japan (原子力委員会, Genshiryokuiinkai) was established in 1956 and serves as the regulatory body for nuclear power in Japan. The Atomic Energy Basic Law contained a provision for its creation, and shortly after the law was enacted, the organization started activities, which are stated to be: assure that research and use of nuclear power is conducted safely and with peaceful intentions, and construct plans for the use and development of nuclear power. It is now structured with 3 different committee members as commission of inquiry to the Cabinet Office.

The AEC is located in Kasumigaseki, Chiyoda, Tokyo.

== See also ==
- Agency for Natural Resources and Energy
- Energy law
- International Nuclear Regulators' Association
- Japanese Nuclear Safety Commission
- Nuclear Power in Japan
- Nuclear Safety

On Japanese nuclear incidents and accidents:

- 2011 Japanese nuclear accidents
- Fukushima Daiichi nuclear disaster
- Japanese reaction to Fukushima Daiichi nuclear disaster
- Japanese nuclear incidents
- Radiation effects from Fukushima Daiichi nuclear disaster
