= Japan Atomic Energy Research Institute =

The Japan Atomic Energy Research Institute (Japanese: 日本原子力研究所) (JAERI) is a former semi-governmental organization that existed for the purpose of further nuclear power in Japan. It was created in June 1956 by the Atomic Energy Basic Law. It merged with Japan Nuclear Cycle Development Institute and became Japan Atomic Energy Agency on October 1, 2005, which currently carries out the purpose outlined in the law. It was called Genken (原研) for short.

== Development ==
A small number of researchers in Japan studied at Argonne National Laboratory in America with the purpose of gaining knowledge that could be taken back to Japan in 1955. Kinichi Torikai was one of those researchers, and he later became president of JAERI. After returning, facilities for nuclear research were established in Tōkai, Ibaraki.

In the 1950s, it was decided that individual electric utilities would import reactor types to meet the rapidly increasing demand for energy in the post-war Japan. In September 1955, JAERI was established as a juridical foundation.In May 1956, it was established as a semi-governmental corporation. In order to secure nuclear fuel as well, Nuclear Fuel Industries was also created. Construction of new plants began shortly thereafter and the first of them, the Tōkai Nuclear Power Plant, started operation in 1966.

== See also ==
- 2011 Japanese nuclear accidents
- Energy law#Japan
- Fukushima I nuclear accidents
- Japanese nuclear incidents
- Japanese reaction to Fukushima I nuclear accidents
- Nuclear power in Japan
