= Japanese nuclear disaster =

Japanese nuclear disaster can refer to:

- The atomic bombing of Hiroshima and Nagasaki, in 1945, at the end of World War II, see Atomic bombings of Hiroshima and Nagasaki
- The nuclear accidents at Fukushima Daiichi following the 2011 Tōhoku earthquake and tsunami, see Fukushima Daiichi nuclear disaster

== See also ==
- List of Japanese nuclear incidents
