= JNES =

JNES may refer to:

- An all-female organization associated with NXIVM, a self-improvement organization accused of racketeering.
- Journal of Near Eastern Studies, an American journal
- Japan Nuclear Energy Safety Organization; see Nuclear and Industrial Safety Agency
