= JNC =

JNC may refer to:

- JNC Corporation, formerly Chisso, a Japanese chemical company
- Japan Nuclear Cycle Development Institute, a constituent of the Japan Atomic Energy Agency
- Jewish National Council, an institution in Mandatory Palestine
- Joventut Nacionalista de Catalunya, a political youth organisation in Catalonia
- Judicial nominating commission, a selection body for judges in some U.S. states
- JnC, a South Korean boy group including Jang Su-won
