= FEPC =

FEPC may refer to:

- Fair Employment Practice Committee, in the United States in the 1940s
- Federation of Electric Power Companies, a Japanese organization
