= Nuclear and Industrial Safety Agency =

Now defunct safety authority in Japan, replaced by the Nuclear Regulation Authority

The Nuclear and Industrial Safety Agency (NISA) (原子力安全・保安院, Genshiryoku Anzen Hoanin) was a Japanese nuclear regulatory and oversight branch of the Agency for Natural Resources and Energy under the Ministry of Economy, Trade and Industry (METI). It was created in 2001 during the 2001 Central Government Reform.

Especially after the Fukushima Daiichi nuclear disaster, NISA was criticized as having a conflict of interest, given that it was part of METI, which is also responsible for promoting nuclear power. As a consequence, it was decided on June 20, 2012 that NISA would be abolished and that it would be replaced by a new agency, under the Ministry of the Environment in September 2012. The Nuclear Regulation Authority (NRA) was founded on September 19, 2012.

The NISA, and now NRA, main office is located in Kasumigaseki, Chiyoda, Tokyo working with the Japanese Atomic Energy Commission (JAEA) as well as providing other functions. The safety authority also has regional offices. It performs oversight for industry as requested by the Japanese government.

== Criticism and reform ==
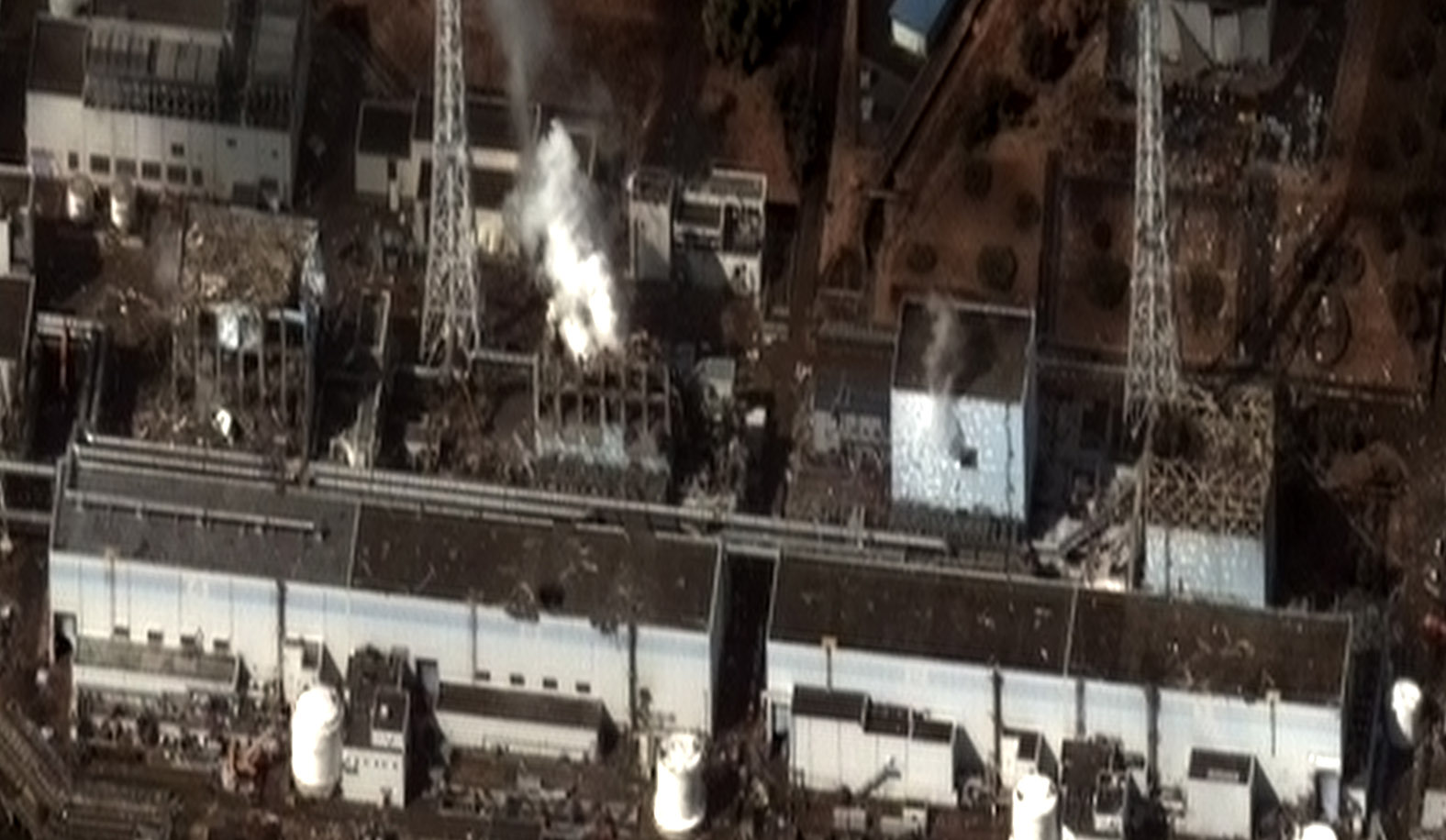
The NISA received strong criticism following the 2011 Fukushima Daiichi nuclear disaster

According to a government report to the International Atomic Energy Agency in June 2011, "NISA's lack of independence from the trade ministry, which promotes the use of atomic power, hampered a quick response to the disaster at Tokyo Electric Power Co.'s Fukushima Dai-Ichi plant this year". Following the Fukushima nuclear disaster, there have been questions raised about whether the Nuclear and Industrial Safety Agency has been fulfilling its function as an industry regulator, and whether it should continue to exist.

The Asahi newspaper reported that the government planned to merge the Nuclear and Industrial Safety Agency with the Nuclear Safety Commission, to create a new nuclear safety agency, under the environment ministry, by April 2012.

On August 5, 2011, then Minister of Economy, Trade and Industry Banri Kaieda announced that an independent panel had started to examine the allegations that NISA repeatedly tried to influence public symposiums on the use of nuclear energy. This came after the confessions of the electric power companies Chubu and Shikoku, that they both had—on instructions by NISA—lined up participants and requested that they ask prearranged questions in favor of nuclear power. The panel would also find out whether other companies might be involved in likewise dubious conduct. The task force was asked to propose a set of guidelines on to what extent the government should be involved in organizing public symposiums.

In an attempt to clean up and to ease the media, Kaieda announced he would sack three senior nuclear policy officials: the head of the Energy Agency, the head of the Nuclear Industrial Safety Agency and a vice-minister at the trade and industry ministry. "We want to refresh and revitalise the ministry," Kaieda said. The three posts are under his supervision.

On Friday 12 August 2011, the Japanese Cabinet decided to separate the NISA from the Minister of Economy, Trade and Industry, because the ministry was too much involved with promoting nuclear energy. The new nuclear watchdog would function directly under the Ministry of the Environment. This was done as part of efforts to review the country's current nuclear administration following the Fukushima nuclear accident. At the same time NISA will merge with the Nuclear Safety Commission, that until that moment functioned under the jurisdiction of the Cabinet Office and the Ministry of Education and Science. The Environment Ministry had been involved already in the disposal of radiation-contaminated debris around the damaged Fukushima Daiichi nuclear plant. The new agency was originally to be launched in April 2012.

Documents, obtained by a major Japanese newspaper, The Mainichi Daily News, after many official information requests, showed that the Japan Nuclear Energy Safety Organization (JNES) copied an inspection manual from an original provided by a supplier of fuel-rods: Global Nuclear Fuel Japan Co. This very company was subject to JNES investigations. The faulty manual was copied almost completely, even the layout was not altered, and the errors in it were missed. At first JNES deputy head of inspections Masaharu Kudo told the newspaper: "we do receive data (from Global Nuclear Fuel), but of course we don't use it as-is. The JNES checks the data and produces its own manual as well." After two official requests the newspaper received the originals the JNES manual and the documents of Global Nuclear Fuel document, Kudo did admit that the documents were indeed identical, but he could see any problem, because JNES and the nuclear fuel firm need to consult each other about the inspection procedures. "The JNES would have no access to the necessary data without the nuclear fuel maker, so we ask them to cooperate," Kudo continued. "It wouldn't be impossible for the JNES to draw up the manuals independently, but if we tried we'd be at it all day." The inspection procedures were obtained from Global Nuclear Fuel in September 2008, and on 18 December 2009 JNES inspected the fuel that was meant for the Higashidori nuclear plant, the manual used was copied directly from the Global Nuclear Fuel documents. Furthermore, JNES staff noticed later that the minimum fuel rod length already reported to the government was 3 to 5 centimeters longer than the value listed in both the inspection manual and the Global Nuclear Fuel draft procedures. The staff had not looked into the manual, but compared the rod with another rod, before all rods were certified. In February 2009 the error in the manual was found. Just before the certification was reported to the government. Later JNES found that it had made the same mistake three times before with the inspections of fuel-rods produced by Global Nuclear Fuel. The examiners failed to notice the mistakes as they did not closely check the manual beforehand. NISA said JNES was ordered to make the corrections needed and also to improve its screening procedures.

On November 4, 2011 the Japan Nuclear Energy Safety Organization (JNES) said, that an independent committee would be formed to investigate how the inspection protocols were compiled. This commission would be selected form legal experts, known for a cautious approach to nuclear policies. The more than 5 members were asked to make a report and finish it by the end of 2011. Other facts to be looked into:

- in 2009 the Hitachi Zosen Corporation did not conduct the necessary tests on a uranium enrichment facility run by Japan Nuclear Fuel Ltd. in Rokkasho, in the prefecture Aomori.
- in 2009 and 2010 JNES failed to perform proper inspections at the Oi Nuclear Power Plant, because JNES had not found the mistakes in the inspection documents.

In July 2004 The Mainichi Daily News and other Japanese newspapers discovered that the Japanese Government had made calculations to estimate the costs of disposing radioactive waste. March 2004, four months, in an answer to questions of the leader of the Social Democratic Party Mizuho Fukushima, at a session of the House of Councillors, Kazumasa Kusaka, as representative of the Japanese government, denied the very existence of these data. However the cost of non-reprocessing options was estimated to be between a quarter and a third ($5.5-7.9 billion) of the cost of reprocessing ($24.7 billion). Kazumasa Kusaka, who was at that time the director general of the Agency for Natural Resources and Energy. Kusaka and Yasui, who wrote the agency head's answer, were reprimanded for giving an "incorrect" answer to the Diet. The two officials were not punished, because former Economy, Trade and Industry Minister Shoichi Nakagawa said, that "Since they had not known the existence of estimated data until recently, the answer was neither a lie nor malicious."

A similar case of cover-up by high-ranking Japanese government officials happened in 2002, when a Russian diplomatic document in which Moscow offered to accept spent nuclear fuel from Japan, was kept secret, because in this way the reprocessing of radioactive waste at a plant in Rokkasho, Aomori Prefecture could be promoted.

At the end of the year 2011 it became clear, that Masaya Yasui, in 2004 director of the agency's Nuclear Power Policy Planning Division, had instructed his subordinate in April 2004 to conceal the data. This raised questions, because Masaya Yasui was appointed in 2011 as counselor in charge of reform of nuclear power safety regulations. On top of this Masaya Yasui was also involved with splitting off the Nuclear and Industrial Safety Agency from the Economy, Trade and Industry Ministry and the re-organization of the NISA to an independent entity in April 2012. The fact that the data were deliberately concealed, obliged the ministry to re-investigate the case and to reconsider to punish the officials involved.

== See also ==
- Nuclear power in Japan
- 2011 Japanese nuclear accidents
- Japanese reaction to Fukushima Daiichi nuclear disaster
- Japanese nuclear incidents
