= Takahama Nuclear Power Plant =

Nuclear power plant in Takahama, Fukui, Japan

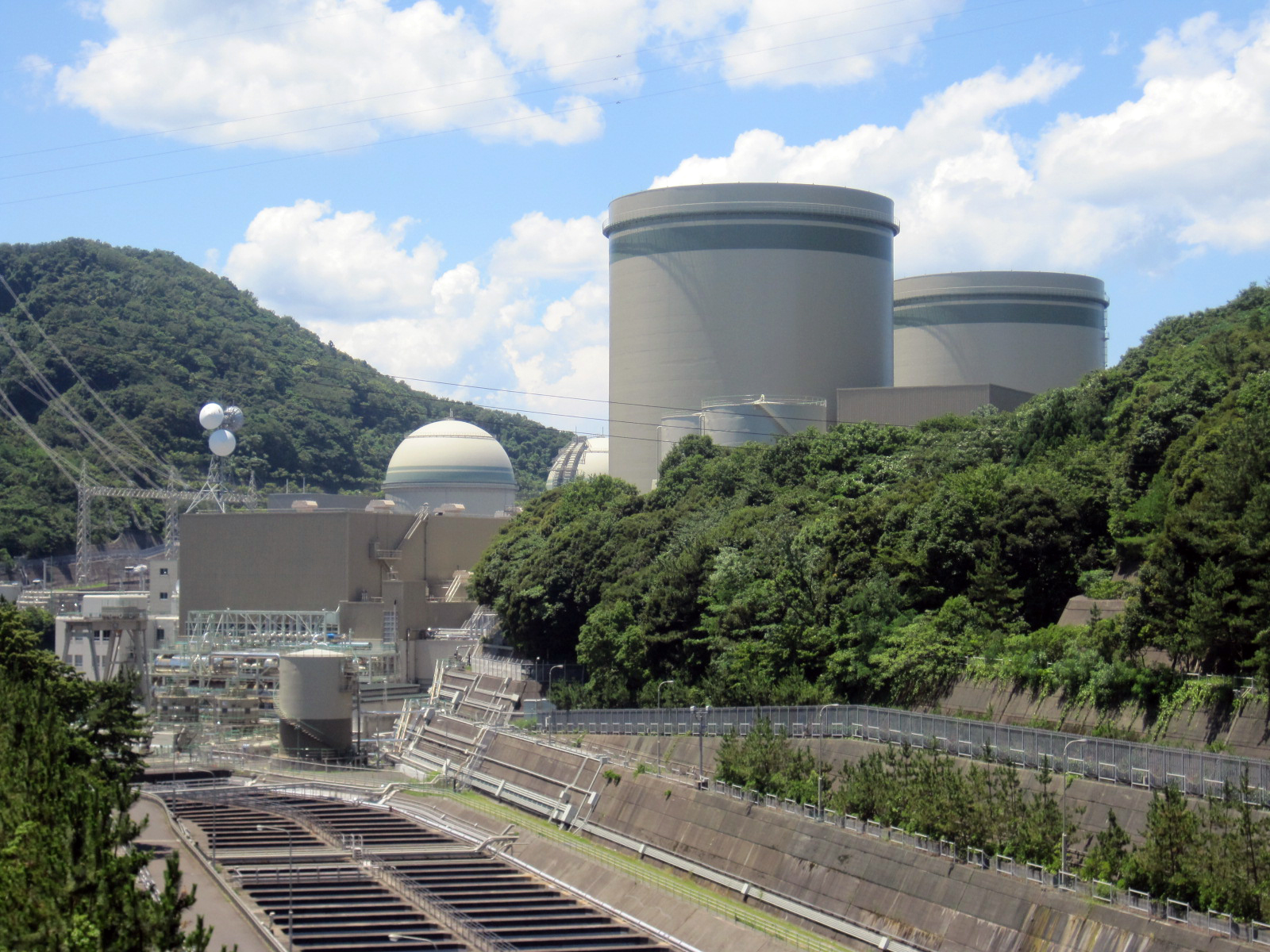
- Takahama Nuclear Power Plant
- Country: Japan
- Location: Takahama, Fukui Prefecture
- Coordinates: 35°31′19.17″N 135°30′14.24″E
- Status: Operational
- Construction began: April 25, 1970
- Commission date: November 14, 1974
- Operator: The Kansai Electric Power Company, Inc.

Nuclear power station
- Reactor type: PWR
- Reactor supplier: Westinghouse; MHI
- Cooling source: Wakasa Bay, Sea of Japan

Power generation
- Units operational: 2 x 826 MW; 2 x 870 MW
- Nameplate capacity: 3,392 MW

External links
- Website: www.kepco.co.jp
- Commons: Related media on Commons

The Takahama Nuclear Power Plant (高浜原子力発電所, Takahama genshiryoku hatsudensho; Takahama NPP) is a nuclear power plant located in the town of Takahama, Ōi District, Fukui Prefecture. It is owned and operated by the Kansai Electric Power Company and is on a site with an area of about 1 km^{2}. The four pressurized water reactors give the plant a total gross electric capacity of 3,392 MW and average yearly production of 22,638 GWh (averaged on 2006–2010 data).

From 2012 to 2016, the plant was shut down most of the time, with only reactor 3 briefly in operation, due to technical problems and opposition from the local residents. Unit 3 and 4 were eventually restarted in May and June 2017, while unit 1 was restarted on 28 July, 2023.

== Reactors on site ==
Name	Reactor type	Manufacturer	Commission date	Power rating	Fuel
Takahama - 1	PWR	Westinghouse Electric	14 November 1974	826 MW	
Takahama - 2	PWR	Mitsubishi Heavy Industries	14 November 1975	826 MW	
Takahama - 3	PWR	Mitsubishi Heavy Industries	17 January 1985	870 MW	MOX from January 2011
Takahama - 4	PWR	Mitsubishi Heavy Industries	5 June 1985	870 MW	

== History ==
=== Maintenance in 2012 ===
On 17 February 2012, Kansai Electric Power Co. announced that on 21 February 2012, reactor no. 3 would be taken off the grid for a regular checkup and maintenance. After that date, only two commercial nuclear power plants were still operating in Japan: the no. 6 reactor of TEPCO at the Kashiwazaki-Kariwa plant in prefecture Niigata, which was scheduled for checkups on 26 March 2012, and the No. 3 reactor at the Tomari plant in Hokkaido of Hokkaido Electric Power Co.; their regular maintenance was planned in late April 2012. From 5 May until 1 July 2012, Japan had no operating nuclear power plants.

On 17 April 2013, a shipment of MOX nuclear fuel to Japan left the port of Cherbourg in northern France, for the first time since the Fukushima disaster, destined for the Takahama nuclear plant. MOX fuel contains around 7% plutonium.

=== Court decision forbids restart ===
As of 16 April 2015, the Takahama reactors were ordered to remain offline by a Japanese court, which cited continued safety concerns. The Fukui District Court rejected a "stay" on its original ruling that, despite approval to restart the plants from Japan's governmental Nuclear Regulation Authority (an agency formed in 2012,) approval guidelines issued by the agency were "lacking in rationality" and "too loose." The Fukui Court issued a similar injunction against the restart of Oi units 3&4 in May 2014. Former Tokyo high court judge and current Chou Law School Professor Jun Masuda criticized Fukui Judge Hideaki Higuchi, who headed the court panel, “It seems the judge has already had the idea of demanding absolute safety from the beginning. Judges are not experts on nuclear power plants, so it is imperative that they humbly pay attention to scientific knowledge. I doubt the presiding judge took that into consideration.” Japan News (Yomiuri Shimbun) also criticized the Fukui decision, “We have no choice but to call it an irrational decision,” and, “Such a stance seeking zero risk is unrealistic.” An appeal by Kansai Electric Company was rejected by the same court in May 2015.

=== Restarting and shutdowns ===
Unit 3 was restarted on 29 January 2016 and Unit 4 on 27 February 2016. However, on 29 February 2016, after three days of operation, the unit was shut down one second after it started generating power. The cause was stated to be a "main transformer/generator internal failure".

On 9 March 2016, the Otsu district court in Shiga prefecture issued an injunction to halt operation of Unit 3 and Unit 4, citing the concerns of local residents. Unit 3 was therefore shut down on 10 March 2016.

=== License extensions and latest restarts ===
On 28 March 2017, the Osaka High Court (one of eight high courts in Japan, each with jurisdiction over one of eight territories), canceled the injunction from the district court.

On 20 June 2016, Japan's Nuclear Regulation Authority (NRA), approved a 20-year license extensions for units 1 and 2. The two units are now authorized to operate until 2034 and 2035. It is the first NRA approved 20-year extension beyond the initial 40-year life of a reactor. Additional safety measures will take three years to be completed, giving a 2019 restart year, at the earliest.

On 22 May 2017, unit 4 was restarted, followed by unit 3 on 6 June 2017. Unit 1 was restarted on 28 July 2023, followed by unit 2 on 15 September 2023.

== See also ==
- List of nuclear power plants in Japan
