= Atomic Energy Basic Law =

Japanese law

The Atomic Energy Basic Law (Japanese: 原子力基本法, Hepburn: Genshi-ryoku Kihon Hō; Act No. 186 of 1955) is a Japanese law passed December 19, 1955. It outlined the basics for the use of nuclear power in Japan.

== Overview ==
=== Article 1 (Objective) ===
The objective of this Law should be to secure energy resources in the future, to achieve the progress of science and technology and the promotion of industries by fostering the research, development and utilization of atomic energy and thereby to contribute to the welfare of mankind and to the elevation of the national living standard.

=== Article 2 (Basic policy) ===
The research, development and utilization of atomic energy shall be limited to peaceful purposes, aimed at ensuring safety and performed independently under democratic management, the results therefrom shall be made public to contribute to international cooperation.

- Article 3 outlines definitions.
- Articles 4-6 create the Japanese Atomic Energy Commission and the Nuclear Safety Commission and outline their basic purpose.
- Article 7: Atomic Energy Development Institutions. This section created the Japan Atomic Energy Research Institute.
- Articles 8-11 Development and Acquisition of Minerals
- Articles 12 and 13 Control over Nuclear Fuel Materials
- Articles 14-16 Control over Reactors
- Articles 17-19 Measures for Patented Inventions
- Article 20 Protection from Radiation Hazards
- Article 21 Compensation

== See also ==
- Nuclear power in Japan
