= Matsutarō Shōriki =

Japanese media proprietor and politician (1885–1969)

- 正力 松太郎
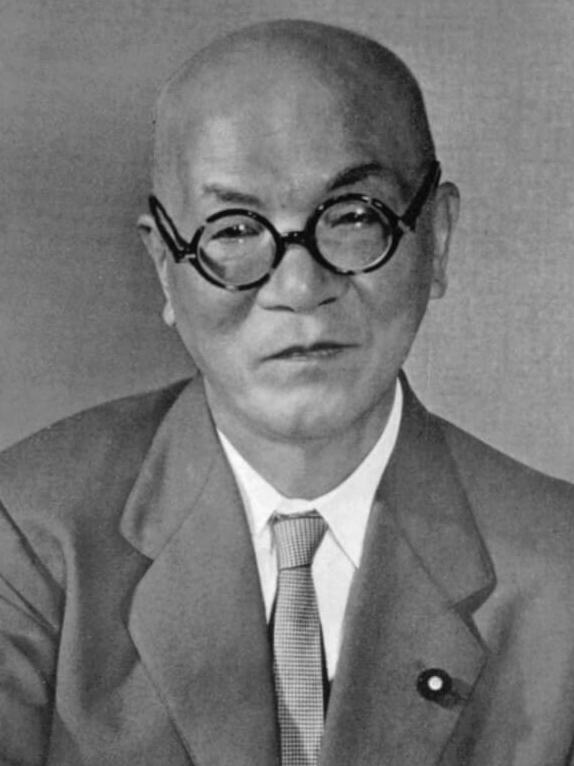
- Shōriki in 1955

Chairman of the National Public Safety Commission
- In office 10 July 1957 – 12 June 1958
- Prime Minister: Nobusuke Kishi
- Preceded by: Tomejirō Okuba
- Succeeded by: Masashi Aoki

Director-General of the Science and Technology Agency
- In office 10 July 1957 – 12 June 1958
- Prime Minister: Nobusuke Kishi
- Preceded by: Kōichi Uda
- Succeeded by: Takeo Miki
- In office 19 May 1956 – 23 December 1956
- Prime Minister: Ichiro Hatoyama
- Preceded by: Office established
- Succeeded by: Kōichi Uda

Chairman of the Atomic Energy Commission
- In office 1 January 1956 – 23 December 1956
- Prime Minister: Ichiro Hatoyama
- Preceded by: Office established
- Succeeded by: Kōichi Uda

Director-General of the Hokkaido Development Agency
- In office 22 November 1955 – 23 December 1956
- Prime Minister: Ichiro Hatoyama
- Preceded by: Tomejirō Ōkubo
- Succeeded by: Tanzan Ishibashi (acting); Matsusuke Kawamura

Member of the House of Representatives
- In office 28 February 1955 – 9 October 1969
- Preceded by: Sōmei Tsuchikura
- Succeeded by: Tamisuke Watanuki
- Constituency: Toyama 2nd

Member of the House of Peers
- In office 18 May 1944 – 13 April 1946 Nominated by the Emperor

Personal details
- Born: 11 April 1885 Daimon, Toyama, Japan
- Died: 9 October 1969 (aged 84) Atami, Shizuoka, Japan
- Party: Liberal Democratic
- Other political affiliations: IRAA (1940–1945); Independent (1945–1954); JDP (1954–1955)
- Children: Tōru Shōriki
- Education: Tokyo Imperial University
- Baseball career

Member of the Japanese

Baseball Hall of Fame
- Induction: 1959

Matsutarō Shōriki (正力 松太郎, Shōriki Matsutarō; 11 April 1885 – 9 October 1969) was a Japanese media proprietor and politician. He was the owner of the Yomiuri Shimbun, founder of the Yomiuri Giants and the Nippon Television Network Corporation.

After a career as a police officer, Shoriki acquired the bankrupt Yomiuri Shimbun in 1924. Under his management it would become one of the major newspapers in Japan. Shoriki also popularised professional baseball in Japan during this time and founded the Yomiuri Giants. After the war Shoriki was arrested as a war criminal, but the charges were dropped in 1947. He founded Japan's first commercial television station, Nippon Television Network Corporation in 1952.

Shoriki also became a prominent supporter of nuclear power in Japan. In 1955 he was elected to the House of Representatives. Shoriki became the first chairman of the Atomic Energy Commission under Prime Minister Ichiro Hatoyama and Chairman of the National Public Safety Commission under Prime Minister Nobusuke Kishi.

For his varied activities he received several appellations, such as the "father of Japanese professional baseball," the "father of Japanese private broadcasting" and the “father of Japanese nuclear power”.

== Early life and career ==
Shōriki was born in Daimon, Toyama. He graduated from Tokyo Imperial University Law School, where he also was a competitive judoka in the Nanatei league. He was one of the most successful judo masters, receiving the extremely rare rank of 10th Dan after his death.

After graduating, Shoriki joined the Home Ministry in 1913 and worked at the Tokyo Metropolitan Police Department, rising high in the ranks. As chief secretary of the Metropolitan Police Department, he was involved in the large-scale crackdown on the Japanese Communist Party in June 1923.

After the Toranomon Incident, an assassination attempt on the Prince Regent Hirohito on 27 December 1923, Shoriki resigned assuming responsibility together with Superintendent General of Tokyo Metropolitan Police Kurahei Yuasa. Although an amnesty cleared him of his disciplinary action, he did not return to public service.

== President of the Yomiuri Shimbun ==
In 1924, with Home Minister Viscount Shinpei Goto providing funds, Shoriki bought the bankrupt newspaper Yomiuri Shimbun and became its president. Shōriki's innovations included improved news coverage and a full-page radio program guide. The emphasis of the paper shifted to broad news coverage aimed at readers in the Tokyo area. By 1941 it had the largest circulation of any daily newspaper in the Tokyo area.

=== Baseball ===
Shōriki is known as the father of Japanese professional baseball. He organized a Japanese baseball All-Star team in 1934 that matched up against an American All-Star team. While prior Japanese all-star contingents had disbanded, Shōriki went pro with this group, which eventually became known as the Yomiuri Giants.

Shōriki survived an assassination attempt by a right-wing nationalist for allowing Americans to play baseball in Jingu Stadium. He received a 16-inch-long scar from a broadsword during the assassination attempt.

Shōriki became Nippon Professional Baseball's (NPB) unofficial first commissioner in 1949. In 1950, Shōriki oversaw the realignment of the Japanese Baseball League into its present two-league structure and the establishment of the Japan Series. One goal Shōriki did not accomplish was a true world series.

== Post-war career ==
After the surrender of Japan, Shōriki was arrested by the Supreme Commander for the Allied Powers as a "Class A" war criminal due to his proximity to the wartime regime, spending 21 months in the Sugamo Prison. On August 22, 1947, a recommendation was made to release Shoriki. He was released after the Americans determined that the accusations against him were mostly of an “ideological and political nature."

=== Nippon Television Network ===
In Japan, private television broadcasting began in the early 1950s thanks largely to the policies of the U.S. occupation authorities. In July 1952, just three months after the US occupation bureaucracy had formally ended, Shōriki was granted a broadcasting license for the new Nippon Television Network (NTV) by Japanese media regulators. This was the first commercial television broadcaster in Japan.

=== Nuclear power ===
In January 1956, Shōriki became chairman of the newly created Japanese Atomic Energy Commission, and in May of that year was appointed head of the brand-new Science and Technology Agency, both under the cabinet of Ichirō Hatoyama with strong support behind the scenes from the U.S. Central Intelligence Agency. He also used his position as owner of the Yomiuri Shimbun to promote nuclear power in the popular media. In 1957, he joined the first Kishi cabinet as chairman of the National Public Safety Commission, and around the same time, the Japanese government entered into a contract to purchase 20 nuclear reactors from the United States of America. Shōriki is thus also now known as "the father of nuclear power."

In 2006, Tetsuo Arima, a professor specialising in media studies at Waseda University in Tokyo, published an article that proved Shōriki served the CIA as an agent under the codenames "PODAM" and "POJACKPOT-1" and worked to establish a pro-US nationwide commercial television network (NTV) and to introduce nuclear power plants using U.S. technologies across Japan. Arima's accusations were based on the findings of de-classified documents stored in the NARA in Washington, D.C.

=== Death ===
Shōriki died on 9 October 1969, in Atami, Shizuoka.

== Tributes ==
In 1959, Shōriki was the first inductee into the Japanese Baseball Hall of Fame. The Matsutaro Shoriki Award is given annually to the person who contributes the most to Japanese baseball.

The position of Chair of the Department of Asia, Oceania, and Africa at the Museum of Fine Arts, Boston is also named after Shōriki.

Political offices
Preceded by Koichi Uda	Minister of State, Head of the Science and Technology Agency; 1957–1958	Succeeded by Takeo Miki
Preceded by Tomejiro Okubo	Chairman of the National; Public Safety Commission; 1957–1958	Succeeded by Aoki Masashi
Preceded by New post	Minister of State, Head of the Science and Technology Agency; 1956	Succeeded by Tanzan Ishibashi
Preceded by New post	Head of the Japanese Atomic Energy Commission; 1956	Succeeded by Koichi Uda
Preceded by Tomejiro Okubo	Minister of State, Head of the Hokkaido Development Agency; 1955–1956	Succeeded by Tanzan Ishibashi
