= Federation of Electric Power Companies =

Organization of power utilities in Japan

The Federation of Electric Power Companies (電気事業連合会, Denki Jigyō Rengōkai) (FEPC), is an industry organization of electric utilities in Japan. Its objective is to harmonize the plans for electric development in Japan. Its main offices are located in Chiyoda, Tokyo.

== History ==
- November 1952: Founded by a group of 9 electric power companies (Hokkaido, Tohoku, Tokyo, Chubu, Hokuriku, Kansai, Chukoku, Kyushu)
- March 2000: The Okinawa Electric Power Company joined.

== See also ==
- Energy in Japan
- Nuclear power in Japan
