= Japanese Nuclear Safety Commission =

Japan's Nuclear Safety Commission (原子力安全委員会, Genshiryoku Anzen Iinkai) was a commission established within the Cabinet of Japan as an independent agency to play the main role in nuclear safety administration. Commissioners are appointed by the Prime Minister of Japan on Diet approval. The commission has stronger authority than any other ordinary advisory committees, in that the commission can make recommendations to relevant agencies in the name of the prime minister if it is necessary.

The Nuclear Safety Commission reviews safety inspections conducted by regulatory agencies, such as the Nuclear and Industrial Safety Agency.

In 2007, the independence of the Nuclear Safety Commission was questioned by seismologist Professor Katsuhiko Ishibashi, after a senior Nuclear and Industrial Safety Agency official appeared to rule out a new review of the NSC's seismic design standards.

Madarame Haruki, as chairman of the Nuclear Safety Commission (2010–2012), was an ardent pro-nuclear advocate. However, his inquiry testimony in the Diet in February 2012, showed that he had become critical of the commission's approach. He said that "Japan's atomic safety rules are inferior to global standards and left the country unprepared for the Fukushima nuclear disaster last March". There were flaws in, and lax enforcement of, the safety rules governing Japanese nuclear power companies, and this included insufficient protection against tsunamis. He said the nuclear power industry had strenuously opposed adopting stricter international safety standards. He spoke of officials ignoring nuclear risks and said, "We ended up wasting our time looking for excuses that these measures are not needed in Japan".

Madarame also asserted that Japan's safety monitoring technology is outdated, while acknowledging that the Nuclear Safety Commission had, "…succumbed to a blind belief in the country’s technical prowess and failed to thoroughly assess the risks of building nuclear reactors in an earthquake-prone country". Regulators and the utilities missed many opportunities to improve operating safety standards and warned that safety regulations are fundamentally inadequate and minimally enforced. He also asserted that regulatory capture was an issue, where regulators had little power and were often subsumed by utility interests. In Madarame's view, there has been a collective heedlessness about safety and inadequate risk management.

It was reported that the government plans to merge the Nuclear and Industrial Safety Agency with the Nuclear Safety Commission, to create a new nuclear safety agency, under the environment ministry, by April 2012. The Nuclear Regulation Authority was created on September 19, 2012.

== History ==
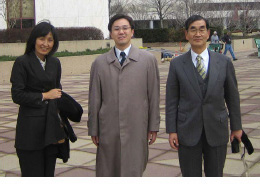
The Representatives from the Nuclear Safety Commission visited the NRC headquarters, in order to exchange information with members of the NRC / OIG. (Rockville, Maryland, February 9, 2005)

- December 1955 Promulgation of the Atomic Energy Basic Law and Law Establishing the Atomic Energy Commission.
- November 1956 Inauguration of Atomic Energy Commission.
- October 1978 Nuclear Safety Commission spun off from Atomic Energy Commission.
- January 1979 Consistent regulatory administration for nuclear safety introduced and counter- checking system established.
- October 1981 Publication of the 1st White Paper on Nuclear Safety.
- November 1999 Role of Nuclear Safety Commission legally specified with enactment of the Special Measures of Nuclear Disaster Act. Role to include technical advice to Prime Minister in nuclear disaster.
- April 2000 Functions of Commission Secretariat transferred from old Science and Technology Agency to old Prime Minister's Office.
- January 2001 With government reorganization, functions of Nuclear Safety Commission and its secretariat transferred to Cabinet Office.
- December 2002 Strengthening the functional capability of overlooking and auditing the activities of regulatory body on account of the amendment of the regulation laws on the nuclear reactors, etc.
- July 13, 2011 Japanese Nuclear Safety Commission made official announcement at last the report dated June 11, 1993 (Heisei 5) titled lit. The event of entire alternating current station blackout on the nuclear power plant (原子力発電所における全交流電源喪失事象について) conducted by a working group. This is reporting the evaluation of the regulations against the possible occurrence of the entire loss or station blackout (SBO) of alternating current in nuclear power plants in other countries and Japan, and it resulted the necessities of further discussions on the methodology to avoid or recover the SBO, and it reported the probability of SBO in Japan is less than other countries on its reliability.
- On August 26, 2011, the Office for the Preparation of Nuclear Safety Regulatory Organization Reform was established at Japan's Cabinet Secretariat in Nagatacho, Tokyo. Later that day a celebration was held in Kasumigaseki. This reform was to split the promotion of nuclear power from the control-function. The task of the new office was to make preparations to realize the new control-body under the Ministry of Environment (MOE) in April 2012 including the necessary legislation for this. The office would be staffed with 37 members from the Cabinet Office, the Ministry of Education, Culture, Sports, Science and Technology (MEXT), the Ministry of Economy, Trade and Industry (METI), and other ministries and agencies, and some delegations from private companies.
- On 2 January 2012 Haruki Madarame, since April 2011 appointed as chief of the Nuclear Safety Commission of Japan, acknowledged that he had received 4 million yen from 2009 to 2011 from Mitsubishi Heavy Industries, a big manufacturer of nuclear power reactors. Another member of the government panel, Seiji Shiroya was paid 3.1 million yen by Japan Atomic Industrial Forum Inc. over three years to 2009, while he was professor at the University of Kyoto. According to Madarame, a former professor of the University of Tokyo, these donations had no influence on their decision-making, when they were promoting nuclear safety by double-checking the regulatory measures implemented by the nuclear industry and science ministries. According to the two scientists, the donations were intended to promote nuclear research, and the money was spent on research and to cover the costs of business trips. Madarame added that all records of the panel-meetings were made published, and the public should judge whether these donations were appropriate.

== See also ==
- Fukushima Daiichi nuclear disaster
- Japanese reaction to Fukushima Daiichi nuclear disaster
- Kudo-kai
- List of Japanese nuclear incidents
- Nuclear power in Japan
- Nuclear safety and security
