= United States-Japan Joint Nuclear Energy Action Plan =

The United States-Japan Joint Nuclear Energy Action Plan is a bilateral agreement designed to establish a framework for joint research and development in nuclear energy technology. The agreement was signed on April 18, 2007.

Japan also maintain nuclear energy agreements with countries such as Australia, Canada, China, France, and the United Kingdom and is in discussion with other nations.

Under the plan, the United States and Japancollaborate on research in several key areas:

Fast reactor technology

Fuel cycle technology

Advanced computer simulation and modeling, small and medium reactors

safeguards and physical protection, and nuclear waste management.

The activities are overseen and coordinated by a joint steering committee.

An initial progress report was scheduled for completion in April 2008.

== See also ==
- United States Global Nuclear Energy Partnership
- Nuclear Power 2010 Program
- Nuclear power in the United States
- Energy policy of the United States
- Energy in Japan
- Nuclear power in Japan
