= Maki Nuclear Power Plant =

Proposed Maki Nuclear Power Plant
- Country: Japan
- Coordinates: 37°45′43.05″N 138°48′25.09″E

The Maki Nuclear Power Plant (巻原子力発電所, Maki genshiryoku hatsudensho) was a proposed nuclear power plant in Maki in Niigata Prefecture but the application was withdrawn. It would have been operated by the Tōhoku Electric Power Company.

The site was a former village that had been buried in sand and became a ghost town in 1971.

== Time line ==
- 1982: Initial application for permission to build the plant.
- 1983: Analysis halted.
- 1994: The mayor of Maki called for the mothballed plan to be revisited. During the same year there was a local referendum.
- 1995: Mayor resigns, replaced with anti-nuclear mayor.
- 1996: Anti-nuclear mayor holds referendum, townspeople veto reactor.
- 1999: Ghost town land sold to anti-nuclear faction.
- 2003: Pro-nuclear minority loses Supreme Court battle, Tohoku Electric announces application will be withdrawn.
- 2 February 2004: Withdrawal of application
