= International Framework for Nuclear Energy Cooperation =

The International Framework for Nuclear Energy Cooperation (IFNEC) is a forum of states and organizations that share a common vision of a safe and secure development of nuclear energy for worldwide purposes. Formerly the Global Nuclear Energy Partnership (GNEP), IFNEC began as a U.S. proposal, announced by United States Secretary of Energy Samuel Bodman on February 6, 2006, to form an international partnership to promote the use of nuclear power and close the nuclear fuel cycle in a way that reduces nuclear waste and the risk of nuclear proliferation. This proposal would divide the world into "fuel supplier nations," which supply enriched uranium fuel and take back spent fuel, and "user nations," which operate nuclear power plants.

As GNEP the proposal proved controversial in the United States and internationally. The U.S. Congress provided far less funding for GNEP than President George W. Bush requested. U.S. arms control organizations criticized the proposal to resume reprocessing as costly and increasing proliferation risks. Some countries and analysts criticized the GNEP proposal for discriminating between countries as nuclear fuel cycle "haves" and "have-nots." In April 2009 the U.S. Department of Energy announced the cancellation of the U.S. domestic component of GNEP.

In 2010, the GNEP was renamed the International Framework for Nuclear Energy Cooperation. IFNEC is now an international partnership with 34 participant and 31 observer countries, and three international organization observers. The international organization observers are: the International Atomic Energy Agency, the Generation IV International Forum, and the European Atomic Energy Community. Since 2015, the Nuclear Energy Agency provides Technical Secretariat support. IFNEC operates by consensus among its partners based on an agreed GNEP Statement of Mission.

== GNEP in the United States ==
The GNEP proposal began as part of the Advanced Energy Initiative announced by President Bush in his 2006 State of the Union address.

In announcing the GNEP Proposal, the U.S. Department of Energy said:

The Global Nuclear Energy Partnership has four main goals. First, reduce America's dependence on foreign sources of fossil fuels and encourage economic growth. Second, recycle nuclear fuel using new proliferation-resistant technologies to recover more energy and reduce waste. Third, encourage prosperity growth and clean development around the world. And fourth, use the latest technologies to reduce the risk of nuclear proliferation worldwide. Through GNEP, the United States will work with other nations possessing advanced nuclear technologies to develop new proliferation-resistant recycling technologies in order to produce more energy, reduce waste and minimize proliferation concerns. Additionally, [the] partner nations will develop a fuel services program to provide nuclear fuel to developing nations allowing them to enjoy the benefits of abundant sources of clean, safe nuclear energy in a cost effective manner in exchange for their commitment to forgo enrichment and reprocessing activities, also alleviating proliferation concerns.

As a research and development program, GNEP is an outgrowth of the Advanced Fuel Cycle Initiative

In April 2009 the U.S. Department of Energy announced the cancellation of the U.S. domestic component of GNEP, and in June 2009 announced that it is no longer pursuing domestic commercial reprocessing and had largely halted the domestic GNEP programme. Research would continue on proliferation-resistant fuel cycles and waste management.

== Partnerships ==
The United States has established a number of cooperative arrangements to pursue technical cooperation on this proposal. On February 16, 2006, the United States, France and Japan signed an "arrangement" to research and develop sodium-cooled fast reactors in support of the GNEP. The United States has established "action plans" for collaboration with Russia, Japan and China.

On September 16, 2007, 16 countries officially became GNEP Partners by signing the GNEP Statement of Principles. These countries were:

- Australia
- Bulgaria
- China
- France
- Ghana
- Hungary
- Japan
- Jordan
- Kazakhstan
- Lithuania
- Poland
- Romania
- Russia
- Slovenia
- Ukraine
- United States

Since then, nine additional countries have joined:

- Armenia
- Canada
- Estonia
- Italy
- Republic of Korea
- Morocco
- Oman
- Senegal
- United Kingdom

Seventeen countries have been invited to join GNEP as partners but have not been willing to sign the Statement of Principles and have participated as observers. These include South Africa, although South African Minerals and Energy Minister Buyelwa Sonjica stated that "Exporting uranium only to get it back refined, instead of enriching it in South Africa, would be 'in conflict with our national policy.'" 25 additional countries have been invited to join GNEP at the October 1, 2008 GNEP Ministerial in Paris, France.

== Criticism ==
In 2007 a large number of U.S. nuclear arms control organizations sent a joint letter to Congress requesting that GNEP funding be terminated on the grounds that it undermined U.S. nuclear proliferation policy, would cost over $100 billion, and did not solve the nuclear waste problem.

In 2008 Congress allocated less than half of the requested funds, supporting GNEP research but not technology demonstration projects. The Congressional Budget Office assessed that reprocessing spent nuclear fuel would cost considerably more than disposal in a long-term repository.

Some states do not approve of the GNEP philosophy that partitions the world between a few fuel-cycle states and a larger number of receiver states, reflecting the distinctions in the Nuclear Non-Proliferation Treaty. They are concerned that their nuclear fuel assurance could in the future be subject to external political pressure. They also believe it creates an unfortunate incentive on states to develop enrichment or reprocessing technology now, to position themselves to become one of the future fuel-cycle states.

Steve Kidd, Head of Strategy & Research at the World Nuclear Association, has explained:

An alternative view of GNEP may see it as somewhat discriminatory and potentially anti-competitive. By restricting parts of the fuel cycle to particular countries, albeit with fair rights of access to nuclear materials, there is a risk of maintaining or even reinforcing the existing NPT arrangements that have always upset certain nations, notably India and Pakistan. Similarly, by maintaining a market stranglehold on, for example, enrichment facilities in the existing countries, it can be argued that the market will be uncompetitive and lead to excessive profits being achieved by those who are so favoured.

Another criticism is that GNEP seeks to deploy proliferation-prone reprocessing technology for commercial reasons, and to bypass the continued delays with the Yucca Mountain nuclear waste repository, while erroneously claiming to enhance global nuclear security.

== See also ==
- Nuclear power
- Integral Fast Reactor
- United States-Japan Joint Nuclear Energy Action Plan
- Franco-British Nuclear Forum
- Section 123 Agreement
