= Japan Nuclear Cycle Development Institute =

Predecessor organisation to the Japanese nuclear agency

The Japan Nuclear Cycle Development Institute (JNC) was formed in October 1998 to develop advanced nuclear energy technology to complete the nuclear fuel cycle, particularly fast breeder reactors, advanced reprocessing, plutonium fuel fabrication and high-level radioactive waste management. It succeeded the Power Reactor and Nuclear Fuel Development Corporation (PNC). It merged with the Japan Atomic Energy Research Institute (JAERI) in October 2005, becoming the Japan Atomic Energy Agency (JAEA).

== See also ==
- Nuclear power in Japan
