= Maki, Niigata (Nishikanbara) =

Coordinates: 37°45′37.8″N 138°53′21.6″E

Maki 巻町
- Former municipality
- Interactive map of Maki
- Country: Japan
- Region: Hokuriku
- Prefecture: Niigata Prefecture
- District: Nishibara District
- Merged: October 10, 2005 (now part of Niigata)

Area
  - Total: 76.14 km^{2} (29.40 sq mi)

Population (2005)
  - Total: 28,713
- Time zone: UTC+09:00 (JST)

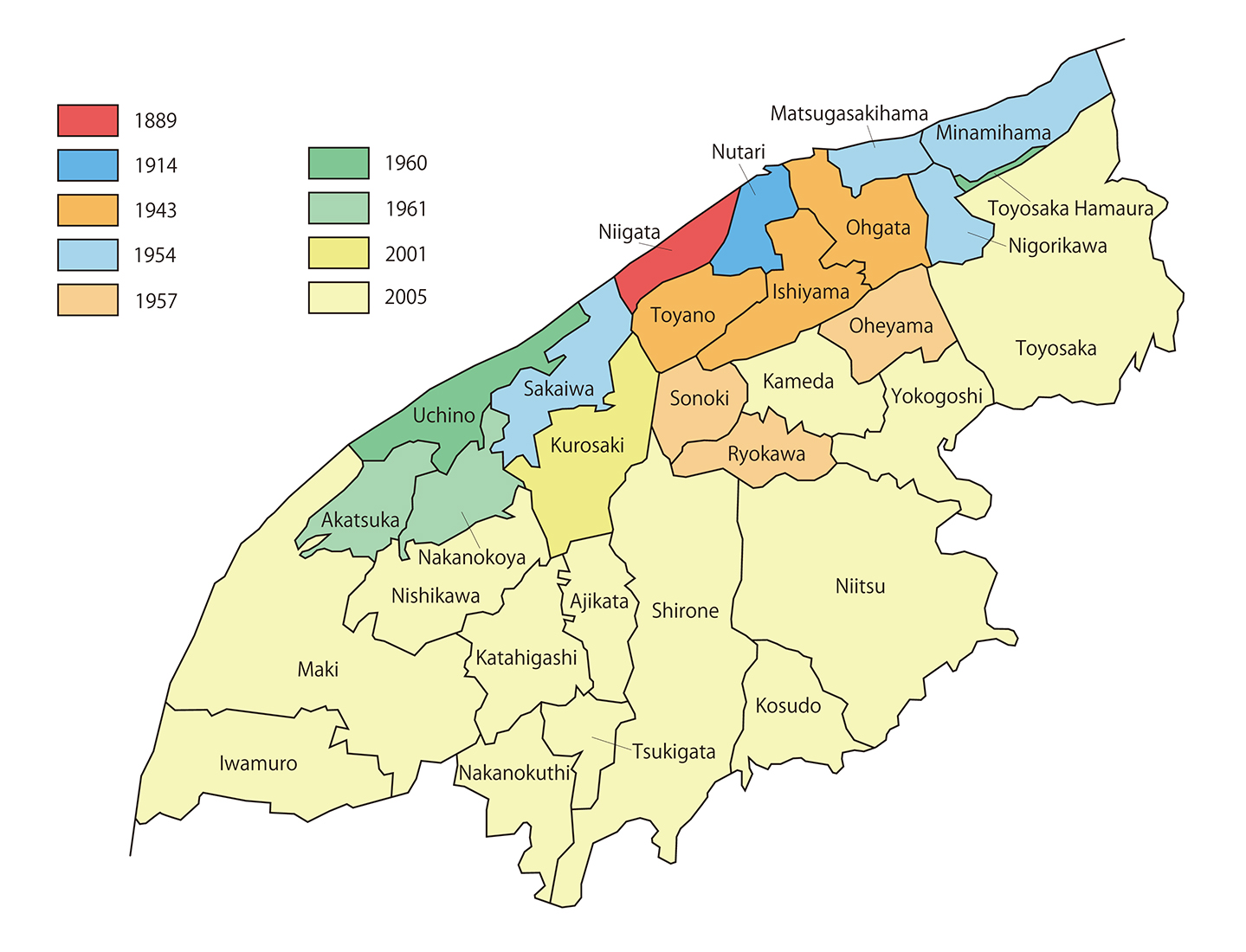
Mergers of Niigata

Maki (巻町, Maki-machi) was a town located in the Nishikanbara District of Niigata Prefecture, Japan. The town merged into Niigata city in October 2005 and now forms part of the Nishikan Ward of the city.

== History ==
The town was established as a village in 1889 as a merger of Shimo-maki Village and other villages. It was promoted to a town in 1891. The population as of April 2005 was 29,039.

In June 2004 the town submitted a merger request to neighbouring Niigata city. In March 2005 the merger proposal was approved by the municipal assemblies of Maki and Niigata. The proposal was approved by the Niigata Prefectural Assembly and the Governor of Niigata Prefecture in July 2005 and by the Minister for Internal Affairs and Communications the following month. The merger came into force on 10 October 2005. On April 1, 2007 Niigata became a government-designated city and the area that was Maki became part of the city's Nishikan Ward.

== See also ==
- Niigata City
- Nishikan-ku, Niigata
- Iwamuro, Niigata
- Maki Station
- Maki Nuclear Power Plant
