= Tōru Shōriki =

Japanese businessman

Shōriki

Tōru Shōriki (正力 亨, Shōriki Tōru, 24 October 1918 – 15 August 2011) was a Japanese businessman and the owner of The Yomiuri Group, the parent of Yomiuri Shimbun Holdings. He was the eldest son of its previous owner, Matsutarō Shōriki.

In 1942, he received his degree from the Faculty of Economics at Keio University.

Shōriki was also owner of the Yomiuri Giants baseball team from 1964 until 1996, again in succession to his father. He retained the title of "honorary owner" until his death in a hospital in Tokyo on 15 August 2011, aged 92.
