= Tōkai, Ibaraki =

Tōkai 東海村
- Village
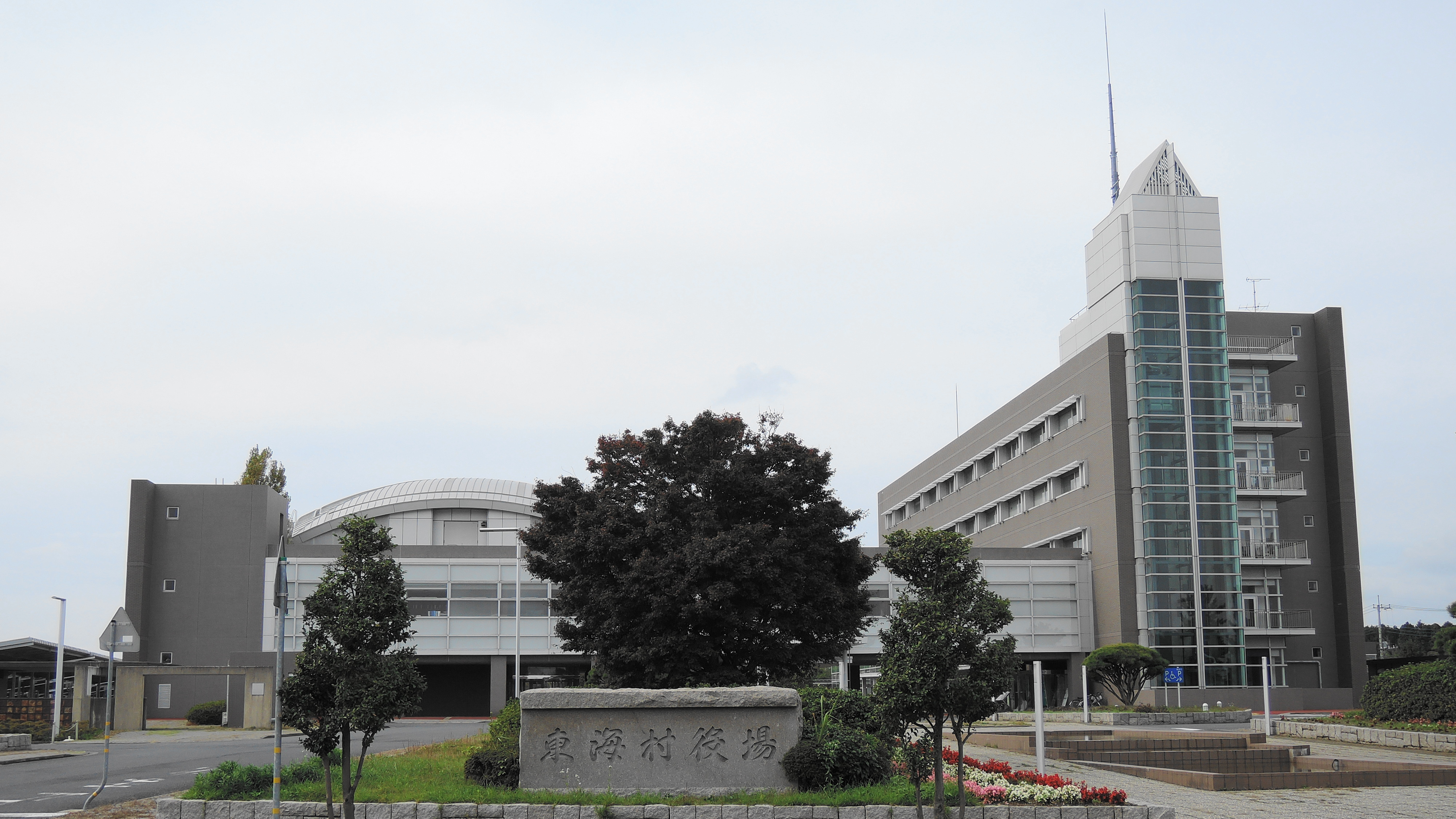
- Tōkai village hall

- Flag Seal

- Location of Tōkai in Ibaraki Prefecture

- Coordinates: 36°28′22.7″N 140°33′58″E
- Country: Japan
- Region: Kantō
- Prefecture: Ibaraki
- District: Naka

Area
  - Total: 37.98 km^{2} (14.66 sq mi)

Population (September 2015)
  - Total: 37,641
  - Density: 991.1/km^{2} (2,567/sq mi)
- Time zone: UTC+9 (Japan Standard Time)
- Tree: Japanese black pine
- Flower: Lilium maculatum
- Bird: Japanese white-eye
- Phone number: 029-282-1711
- Address: 3-7-1 Tōkai, Tōkai-mura, Naka-gun, Ibaraki-ken 319-1117
- Website: Official website

Tōkai (東海村, Tōkai-mura) is a village located in Ibaraki Prefecture, Japan. As of 1 July 2020, the village had an estimated population of 37,651 in 15,148 households and a population density of 991 persons per km^{2}. The percentage of the population aged over 65 was 25.8%. The total area of the village is 38.0 square kilometres (14.7 sq mi). The Japan Atomic Energy Agency along with other organizations currently operate a number of nuclear technology research facilities in the town. In particular, Tōkai Nuclear Power Plant is located in Tōkai.

== Geography ==
Located in central Ibaraki Prefecture, approximately 120 kilometres (75 mi) north of Tokyo, Tōkai is bordered to the east by the Pacific Ocean. The village is about 15 kilometers northeast of the prefectural capital of Mito. with the Kuji River to the north. The area is located at the northern end of the Hitachi Plateau, and consists of lowlands which are alluvium and covered with rice paddy fields, and the plateau is diluvial, with upland fields and flatland forests.

=== Surrounding municipalities ===
Ibaraki Prefecture

- Hitachi
- Hitachinaka
- Naka

== Demographics ==
Per Japanese census data, the population of Tōkai has grown steadily over the last century.

Historical population
Year	Pop.	±%
1920	6,804	—
1930	7,153	+5.1%
1940	8,774	+22.7%
1950	11,462	+30.6%
1960	13,978	+22.0%
1970	18,960	+35.6%
1980	29,197	+54.0%
1990	31,557	+8.1%
2000	34,333	+8.8%
2010	37,438	+9.0%
2020	37,891	+1.2%

== History ==
The villages of Muramatsu and Ishigami were created with the establishment of the modern municipalities system on April 1, 1889. On March 31, 1955, the two villages merged to form the village of Tōkai. In 1956, Japan Atomic Energy Research Institute was established at Tōkai. After JRR-1, the first nuclear reactor in Japan, reached criticality, many nuclear-related facilities such as Japan Atomic Energy Agency, Japan Atomic Power Company Tokai Power Station and Tokai No. 2 Power Station have been concentrated in the village, which became the base of the Japanese nuclear industry. The village was the site of the Tokaimura nuclear accident which occurred at the JCO nuclear reprocessing plant on 30 September 1999, which killed two people.

== Government ==
Tōkai has a mayor-council form of government with a directly elected mayor and a unicameral village council of 18 members. Tōkai contributes one member to the Ibaraki Prefectural Assembly. In terms of national politics, the village is part of Ibaraki 5th district of the lower house of the Diet of Japan.

== Economy ==
The nuclear power industry, together with associated government and private research facilities (including the J-PARC particle physics laboratory), and government subventions form the basis of the local economy.

== Education ==
Tōkai has six public elementary schools and two public middle schools operated by the village government, and one public high school operated by the Ibaraki Prefectural Board of Education. In addition, the University of Tokyo and the Graduate University for Advanced Studies have research facilities located at Tōkai.

== Transportation ==
=== Railway ===
JR East – Jōban Line

- Tōkai

=== Highway ===
- Jōban Expressway – Tōkai Interchange
- National Route 6
- National Route 245

=== Seaports ===
- Port of Ibaraki

== International relations ==
- Idaho Falls, Idaho, United States

== Noted people ==
- Masaru Hashimoto, politician
- Teruaki Kobayashi, professional soccer player
