= Okinawa Electric Power Company =

Electric utility in Japan

The Okinawa Electric Power Company, Incorporated
- Company type: Public KK (TYO: 9511)
- Industry: Energy
- Predecessor: Ryukyu Electric Power Corporation
- Founded: May 15, 1972; 54 years ago Urasoe, Okinawa, Japan
- Headquarters: Urasoe, Okinawa, Japan
- Area served: Okinawa Prefecture
- Revenue: ¥162,501 million (2010, consolidated)
- Operating income: ¥17,397 million (2010, consolidated)
- Net income: ¥8,950 million (2010, consolidated)
- Total assets: ¥365,299 million (2010, consolidated)
- Total equity: ¥119,651 million (2010, consolidated)
- Number of employees: 2,495 (2010, consolidated)
- Website: www.okiden.co.jp

The Okinawa Electric Power Company, Incorporated (沖縄電力株式会社, Okinawa Denryoku Kabushiki-gaisha), OEPC or Okiden (沖電) for short, is an electric utility with its exclusive operational area of Okinawa Prefecture, Japan. It is the smallest by electricity sales among Japan’s ten regional power utilities. For comparison, its electricity sales is approximately ^{1}/_{40} of that of The Tokyo Electric Power Company. However, it is the largest by revenue among companies headquartered in Okinawa.
