= Nuclear Regulation Authority =

Nuclear safety authority in Japan

Agency overview
- Formed: September 19, 2012
- Jurisdiction: Government of Japan
- Headquarters: 9-9, Roppongi 1-chome, Minato-ku, Tokyo, Japan 106-8450
- Employees: 1,133
- Agency executives: Shinsuke Yamanaka, Chairman; Nobuhiko Ban, Commissioner; Shinya Nagasaki, Commissioner; Kousyun Yamaoka, Commissioner; Tomoyuki Sugiyama, Commissioner
- Website: http://www.nsr.go.jp/english/

The Nuclear Regulation Authority (Japanese: 原子力規制委員会, Hepburn: Genshiryoku Kisei Iinkai; NRA) is an administrative body of the Cabinet of Japan established to ensure nuclear safety in Japan as part of the Ministry of the Environment. Established on September 19, 2012, its first head was Shunichi Tanaka.

== Background ==
The NRA was formed from the Nuclear Safety Commission, which came under the authority of the Cabinet, and the Nuclear and Industrial Safety Agency (NISA), which was under the Ministry of Economy, Trade and Industry (METI). After the Fukushima nuclear disaster following the March 11, 2011, earthquake, the government's safety measures were seen to be inadequate. Also, NISA, being under the umbrella of METI, which was also responsible for promoting the use of nuclear power, was seen as having a conflict of interest. As a consequence, the new agency was established under the Ministry of the Environment.

== Early days ==
According to the law establishing the NRA, the task of working out new nuclear safety rules must be completed within ten months of its September 19, 2012, launch. Chairman Tanaka said that the Authority was determined to undertake a radical review of the existing safety standards and planned to finish the outline of the safety rules by the end of 2012.

== Guidelines changed for iodine-tablets in case of a nuclear disaster ==
On 19 July 2013, the NRA updated its guidelines for the distribution and use of stabilized iodine tablets. Under the old rules designed in 2002 by the former regulator, the NSA, iodine tablets were recommended for those up to the age of 40. These former guidelines were based on studies done on the health of the atomic bomb survivors of Nagasaki and Hiroshima. Later studies however showed that although older people had less risk of developing cancer, the risk was not zero. Therefore, the age limit of 40 was abandoned. Because tablets were needed for approximately 4.8 million people who live within 30 kilometers of a nuclear reactor, implementation may take some time with only one pharmaceutical firm in Japan available for the production. Distribution would be started soon, and local governments were ordered to hold briefings for their residents. The NRA also warned that the use of iodine tablets could cause hypothyroidism, a slow-functioning thyroid gland.

== See also ==
- Ministry of the Environment (Japan)
