= Agency for Natural Resources and Energy =

Japanese Government Agency

Agency logo

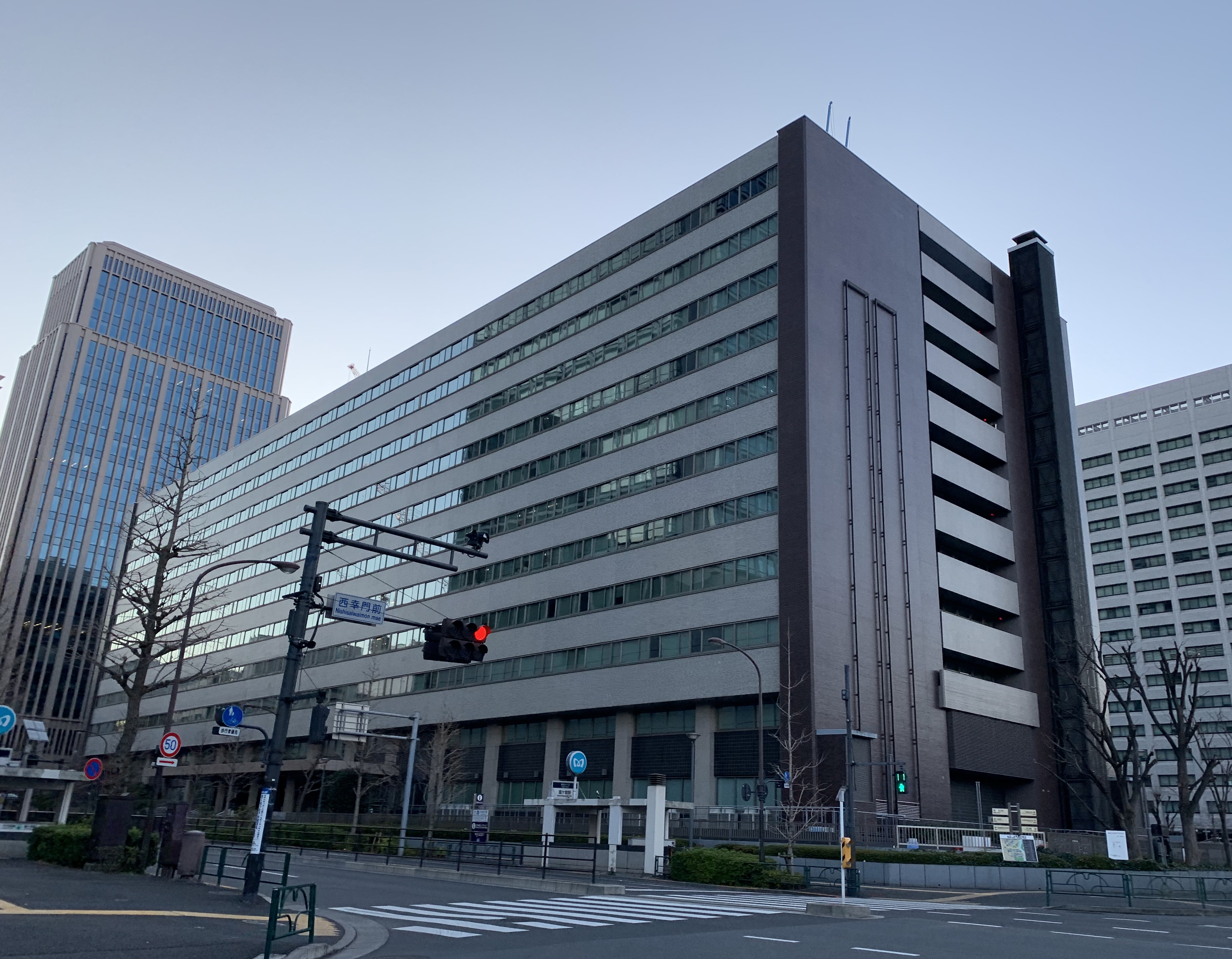
Ministry of Economy, Trade and Industry General Office Building Annex

The Agency for Natural Resources and Energy (資源エネルギー庁, Shigen-enerugī-chō, ANRE), is part of the Ministry of Economy, Trade and Industry (METI). It is responsible for Japan's policies regarding energy and natural resources. Established in 1973, the 1973 oil crisis became the agency's first challenge. The rising price of fuel oil, and a lack of indigenous supplies, led the agency to promote independent energy development and supply source diversification, in addition to the increased stockpiling of oil supplies. The agency leads Asian countries in energy-saving efforts.
