= List of Japanese nuclear incidents =

List of nuclear and radiological incidents that occurred in Japan

This is a list of Japanese atomic, nuclear and radiological accidents, incidents and disasters.

== List ==
Date	Incident level	Location	Type
Description			Notes
6 August 1945	Nuclear bombing	Hiroshima	Bomb flown in on airplane and dropped over urban area; 13kt explosion
Main article: Atomic bombings of Hiroshima and Nagasaki United States of America aviators detonated nuclear bomb over Hiroshima. More than 70,000 fatalities were estimated.			
9 August 1945	Nuclear bombing	Nagasaki	Bomb flown in on airplane and dropped over urban area; 21kt explosion
Main article: Atomic bombings of Hiroshima and Nagasaki United States of America aviators detonated nuclear bomb over Nagasaki. More than 39,000 fatalities were estimated.			
1 March 1954	Nuclear weapons test	Bikini Atoll	Nuclear test poisoned crew of Japanese fishing boat; 15Mt explosion
Main article: Operation Castle United States high yield nuclear test Castle Bravo contaminated crew of Japanese tuna fishing boat Daigo Fukuryū Maru giving them acute radiation syndrome. One crew member died of complications.			
5 December 1965	Broken arrow	coast of Japan	Loss of a nuclear bomb
A US Navy aircraft with one B43 nuclear bomb fell off the aircraft carrier Ticonderoga into 16,200 feet (4,900 m) of water while the ship was underway from Vietnam to Yokosuka, Japan. The weapon was never recovered. Navy documents show it happened about 80 miles (130 km) from the Amami Islands and 200 miles (320 km) from Okinawa.			
March 1981	INES Level 2	Tsuruga	Overexposure of workers
More than 100 workers were exposed to doses of up to 155 millirem per day radiation during repairs of a nuclear power plant.			
June 1999	INES Level 2	Shika plant, Ishikawa Prefecture	Control rod malfunction
Operators attempting to insert one control rod accidentally withdrew three causing a 15-minute uncontrolled sustained reaction at the number 1 reactor of Shika Nuclear Power Plant.			
30 September 1999	INES Level 4	Ibaraki Prefecture	Accidental criticality
Main article: Tokaimura nuclear accident During preparation of a uranyl nitrate solution, uranium in solution exceeded the critical mass, at a uranium reprocessing facility in Tokai-mura northeast of Tokyo, Japan. Three workers were exposed to (neutron) radiation doses in excess of allowable limits. Two of these workers died. 116 other workers received lesser doses of 1 mSv or greater though not in excess of the allowable limit.			
11–15 March 2011	INES Level 3	Fukushima II Nuclear Power Plant, Fukushima Prefecture	Earthquake/tsunami damage, overheating, possible radioactivity emergency
See also: Timeline of the Fukushima II nuclear accidents and Timeline of the Fukushima I nuclear accidents After the 2011 Tōhoku earthquake and tsunami of 11 March, the cooling systems for three reactors (numbers 1, 2 and 4) of the Fukushima II (Fukushima Dai-ni) nuclear power plant were compromised due to damage from the tsunami. Nuclear Engineering International reported that all four units were successfully automatically shut down, but emergency diesel generators at the site were out of order. People were evacuated around 10 kilometres (6.2 mi) from the plant, due to possible radioactive contamination. By 15 March, all four reactors at Daini were reported shutdown, cold and safe.			
11 March 2011 – onwards	INES Level 7	Fukushima Daiichi Nuclear Power Plant, Fukushima Prefecture	Earthquake/tsunami damage, multiple meltdowns, core breaches, explosions, radiological releases, cooling failures
Main article: Fukushima Daiichi nuclear disaster After the 2011 Tōhoku earthquake and tsunami of 11 March, the cooling systems for multiple reactors (units 1, 2, 3) and spent fuel cooling ponds (all 6 units and central pool) of the Fukushima I (Fukushima Dai-ichi) nuclear power plant were compromised due to damage from the tsunami.			

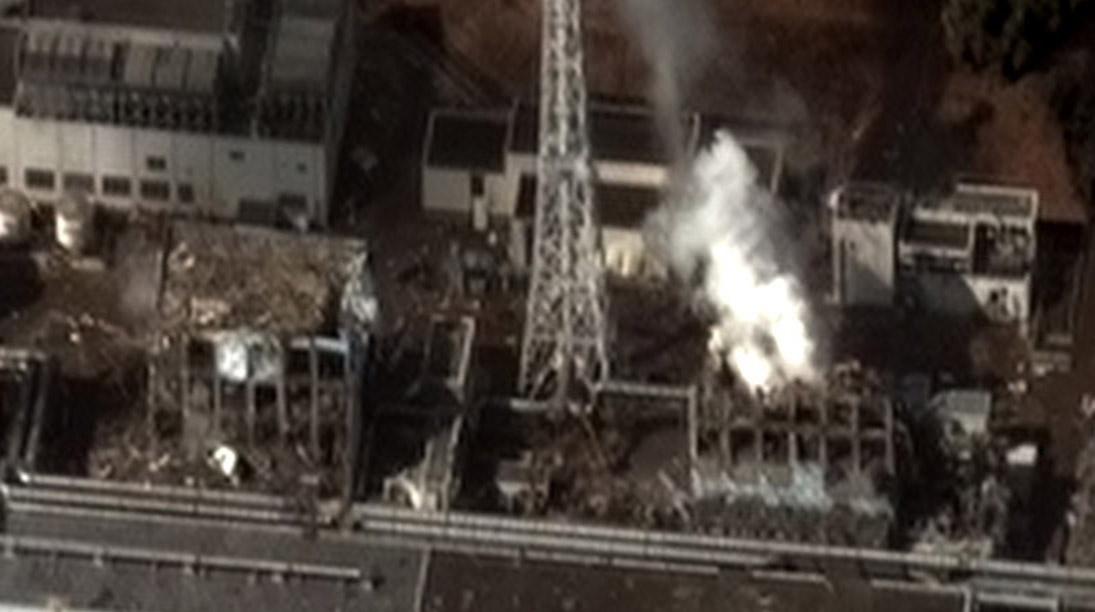
The 2011 Fukushima Daiichi nuclear disaster, the worst nuclear accident in 25 years, displaced 50,000 households after radiation leaked into the air, soil and sea.

== List of plants affected by 2011 Tōhoku earthquake and tsunami ==
- Onagawa Nuclear Power Plant
- Higashidōri Nuclear Power Plant
- Tōkai Nuclear Power Plant
- Tsuruga Nuclear Power Plant
- Rokkasho Reprocessing Plant

== See also ==
- Nuclear power in Japan
- List of civilian nuclear accidents
- List of civilian nuclear incidents
- List of civilian radiation accidents
- List of military nuclear accidents
