= Tōhoku region =

Portion of Honshu island, Japan

Tōhoku region 東北地方
- Region
- Tōhoku region in Japan

- Prefectures and major cities in Tōhoku
- Coordinates: 38.90°N 140.67°E
- Country: Japan
- Largest city: Sendai

Area
  - Total: 66,951.97 km^{2} (25,850.30 sq mi)

Population (October 1, 2025)
  - Total: 8,080,301
  - Density: 120.6880/km^{2} (312.5805/sq mi)

GDP
  - Total: JP¥35.159 trillion US$323 billion
- Time zone: UTC+09:00 (JST)

The Tōhoku region (東北地方, Tōhoku chihō; Japanese pronunciation: [tò̞ó̞.hó̞.kɯ̈́, -kɯ̥̈ c̟͡ɕí.hò̞ò̞, -kɯ̥̈ c̟͡ɕi̥.hó̞ò̞, tó̞ó̞-]), Northeast region, Ōu region (奥羽地方, Ōu chihō; [ó̞ò̞.ɯ̈̀, ò̞ó̞.ɯ̈́ c̟͡ɕí.hò̞ò̞, -c̟͡ɕi̥.hó̞ò̞, ó̞ó̞.ɯ̈́-]), or Northeast Japan (東北日本, Tōhoku Nihon) consists of the northeastern portion of Honshu, the largest island of Japan. It consists of six prefectures (ken): Akita, Aomori, Fukushima, Iwate, Miyagi, and Yamagata.

Tōhoku retains a reputation as a remote, scenic region with a harsh climate. In the 20th century, tourism became a major industry in the Tōhoku region.

== History ==
=== Ancient and classical period ===
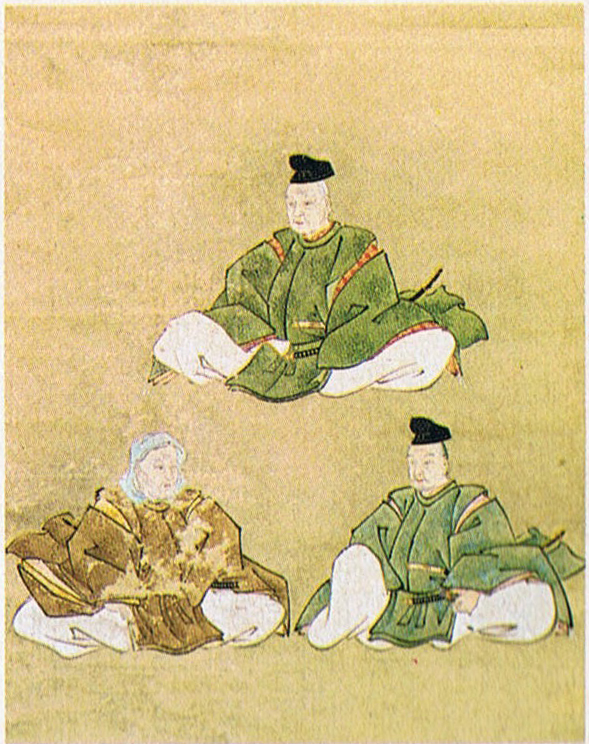
Mōtsū-ji portrait of three generations of the Northern Fujiwara. The top is Fujiwara no Kiyohira, the right is Fujiwara no Motohira, the left figure is Fujiwara no Hidehira.

In mythological times, this area, along with Kantō region, was called Azuma (吾妻, あづま) and was the region of Honshu occupied by the indigenous peoples known as the Emishi, and, later, the Ainu. The area was historically the Dewa and the Mutsu or Michinoku regions, a term first recorded in the Hitachi no kuni Fudoki (常陸国風土記) (654). There is some variation in modern usage of the term "Michinoku". The combination of the kanji used to write Dewa and Mutsu/Michi was read as Ōu (奥羽), and sometimes is used in place of the name Tōhoku in texts.

Yamato (ethnic Japanese) settlement in the Tōhoku occurred between the seventh and ninth centuries, well after the Yamato culture had become firmly established in central and southwestern Japan. As the last stronghold of the Emishi, the indigenous peoples of Honshu, and the site of many battles, the region has at various times throughout history maintained a degree of autonomy from Kyoto.

The Northern Fujiwara (奥州藤原氏, Ōshū Fujiwara-shi) were a kuge (Yamato noble clan of the Heian) that ruled the Tōhoku in the 12th century as their own realm. They were independent from the Imperial Court in Kyoto by the strength of their warrior bands. This ended when Minamoto no Yoritomo, head of the Minamoto clan and founder of the Kamakura shogunate, defeated them in 1189 a few years after the Genpei War. Fujiwara no Kiyohira (藤原清衡), who was of mixed Yamato and Emishi parentage, was its first ruler. He ruled from what is now Hiraizumi in Iwate Prefecture beginning about 1100. Initially, he used the clan name Kiyohara, but later adopted his father's clan name. He was married to a wide variety of wives, including two Emishi women and a Taira noblewoman, to establish strong alliances for his stake.

=== Feudal period ===
==== Christianity in Tōhoku ====
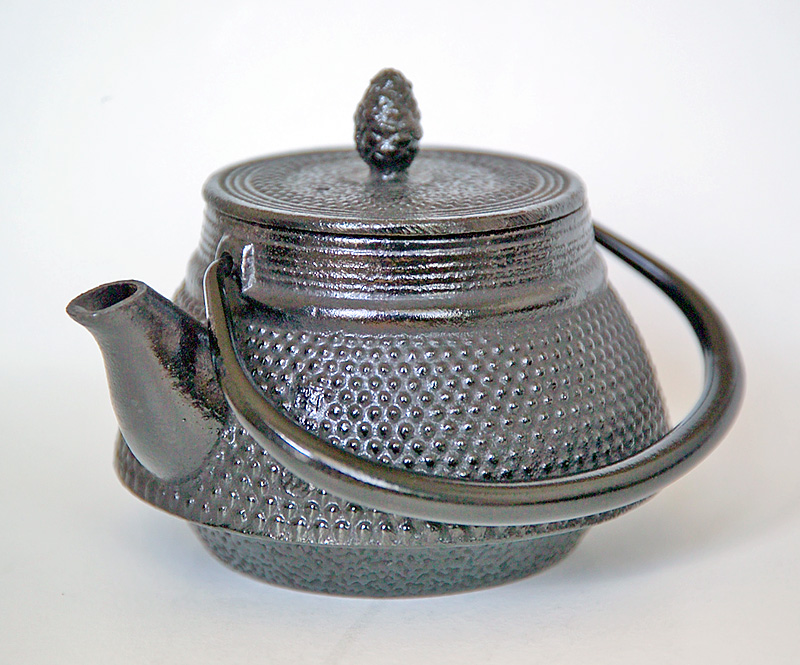
Cast iron teapots like this one sit atop stoves during the long winters in Tōhoku.

Date Masamune (1567–1636), feudal lord of Date clan, expanded trade in the Tōhoku region. Although initially faced with attacks by hostile clans, he managed to overcome them after a few defeats and eventually ruled one of the largest fiefdoms of the later Tokugawa shogunate. He built many palaces and worked on many projects to beautify the region. He is also known to have encouraged foreigners to come to his land.

Even though he funded and promoted an envoy to establish relations with the Pope in Rome, he was likely motivated at least in part by a desire for foreign technology, similar to that of other lords, such as Oda Nobunaga. He showed sympathy for Christian missionaries and traders in Japan. In addition to allowing them to come and preach in his province, he released the prisoner and missionary Padre Sotelo from the hands of Tokugawa Ieyasu. Date Masamune allowed Sotelo as well as other missionaries to practice their religion and win converts in Tōhoku.

Once Tokugawa Ieyasu (1543–1616) outlawed Christianity, Masamune reversed his position, and though disliking it, let Ieyasu persecute Christians in his domain. For 270 years, Tōhoku remained a place of tourism, trade and prosperity. Matsushima, for instance, a series of tiny islands, was praised for its beauty and serenity by the wandering haiku poet Matsuo Bashō.

=== Early modern period ===
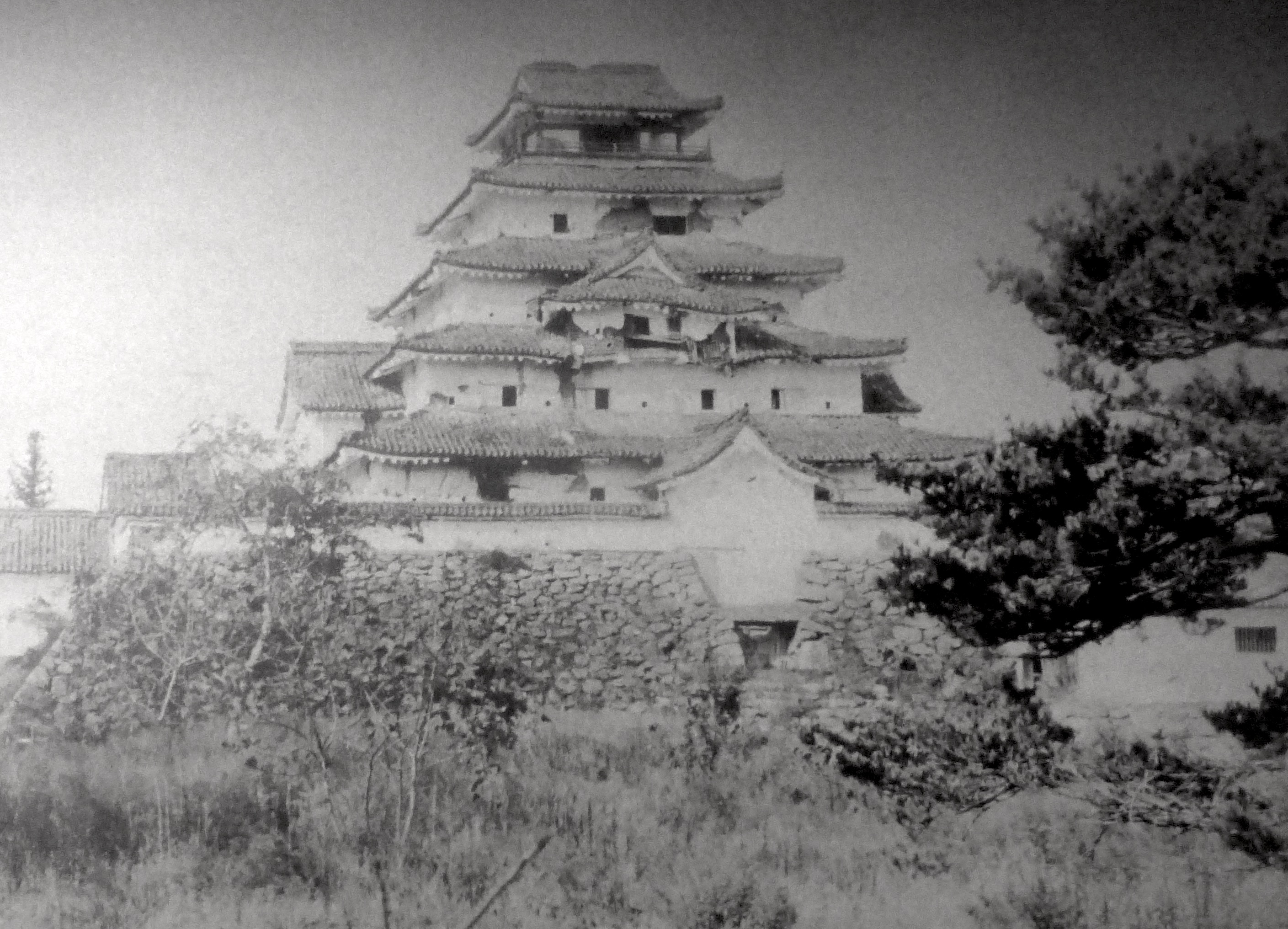
Aizuwakamatsu Castle after the Battle of Aizu, 1868 photograph

The haiku poet Matsuo Bashō (1644–1694) wrote Oku no Hosomichi (The Narrow Road to the Deep North) during his travels through Tōhoku.

=== Contemporary period ===
In the 1960s, ironworks, steelmaking, cement, chemical industry, pulp, and petroleum refining industries began developing. The region is traditionally known as a less developed area of Japan.

The catastrophic 9.0-magnitude earthquake and tsunami on March 11, 2011, inflicted massive damage along the east coast of this region, causing 19,759 deaths, and was the costliest natural disaster ever which left 500,000 people homeless along with a radiation accident at the Fukushima Daiichi Nuclear Power Plant.

== Geography ==
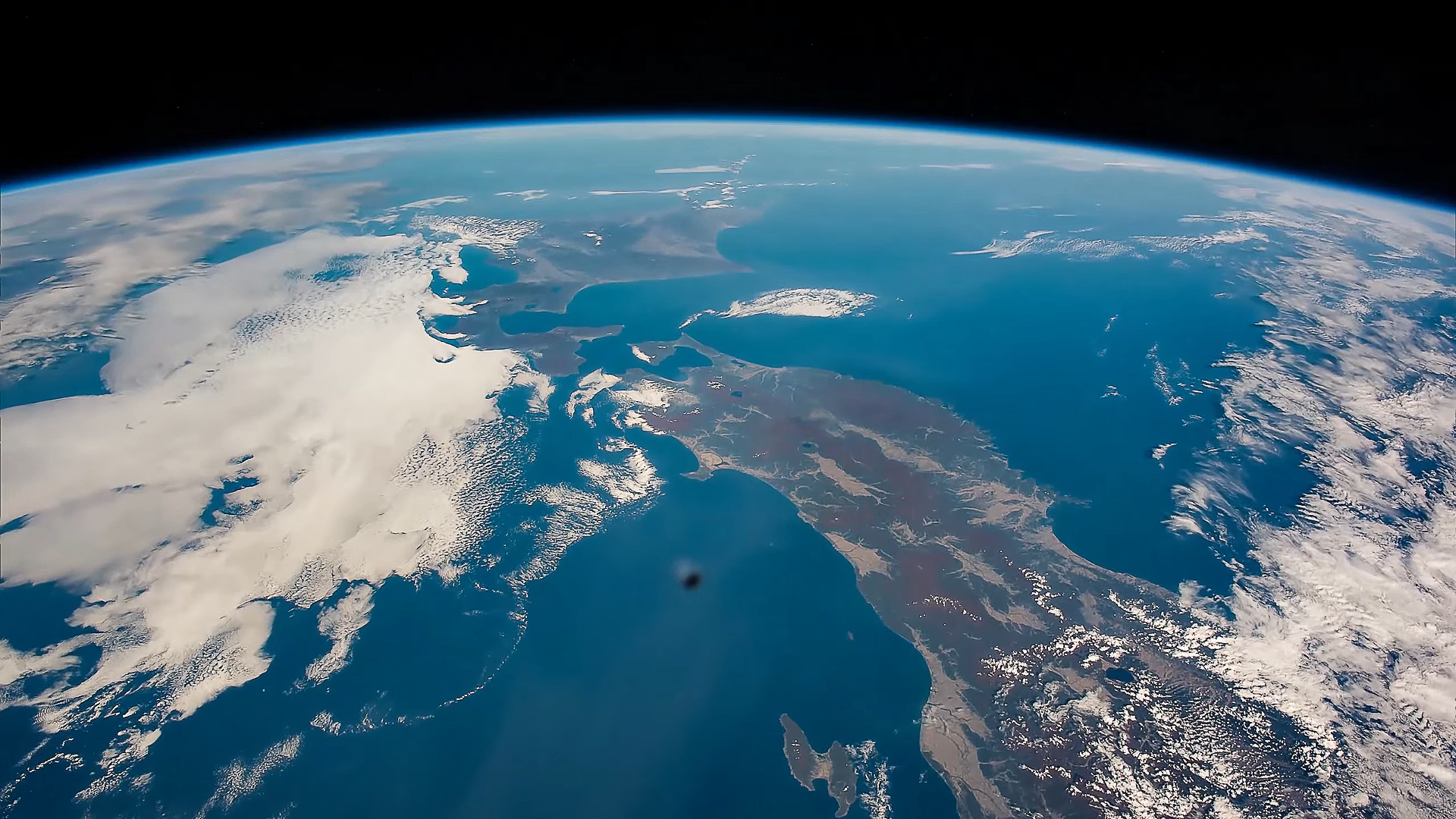
The Tōhoku region and Hokkaido seen from space

A geofeatures map of Tōhoku

Tōhoku, like most of Japan, is hilly or mountainous, with the Ōu Mountains running north–south. The inland location of many of the region's lowlands has led to a concentration of much of the population there. Coupled with coastlines that do not favor seaport development, this settlement pattern resulted in a much greater than usual dependence on land and rail transportation. Low points in the central mountain range make communications between lowlands on either side of the range moderately easy.

Tōhoku was traditionally considered the granary of Japan because it supplied Sendai and the Tokyo-Yokohama market with rice and other farming commodities. Tōhoku provided 20 percent of the nation's rice crop.

Gallery

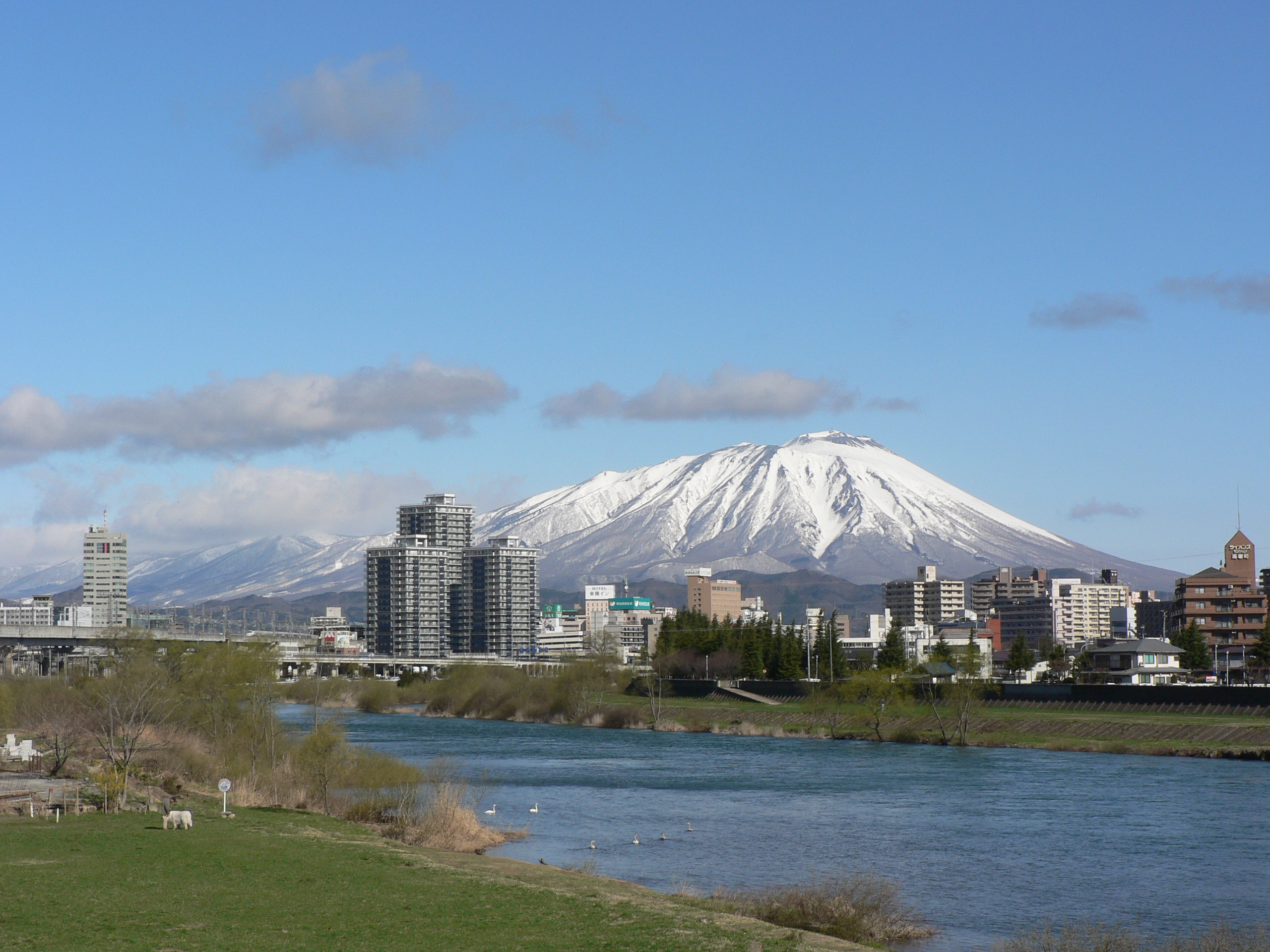
Mount Iwate dominates the city of Morioka

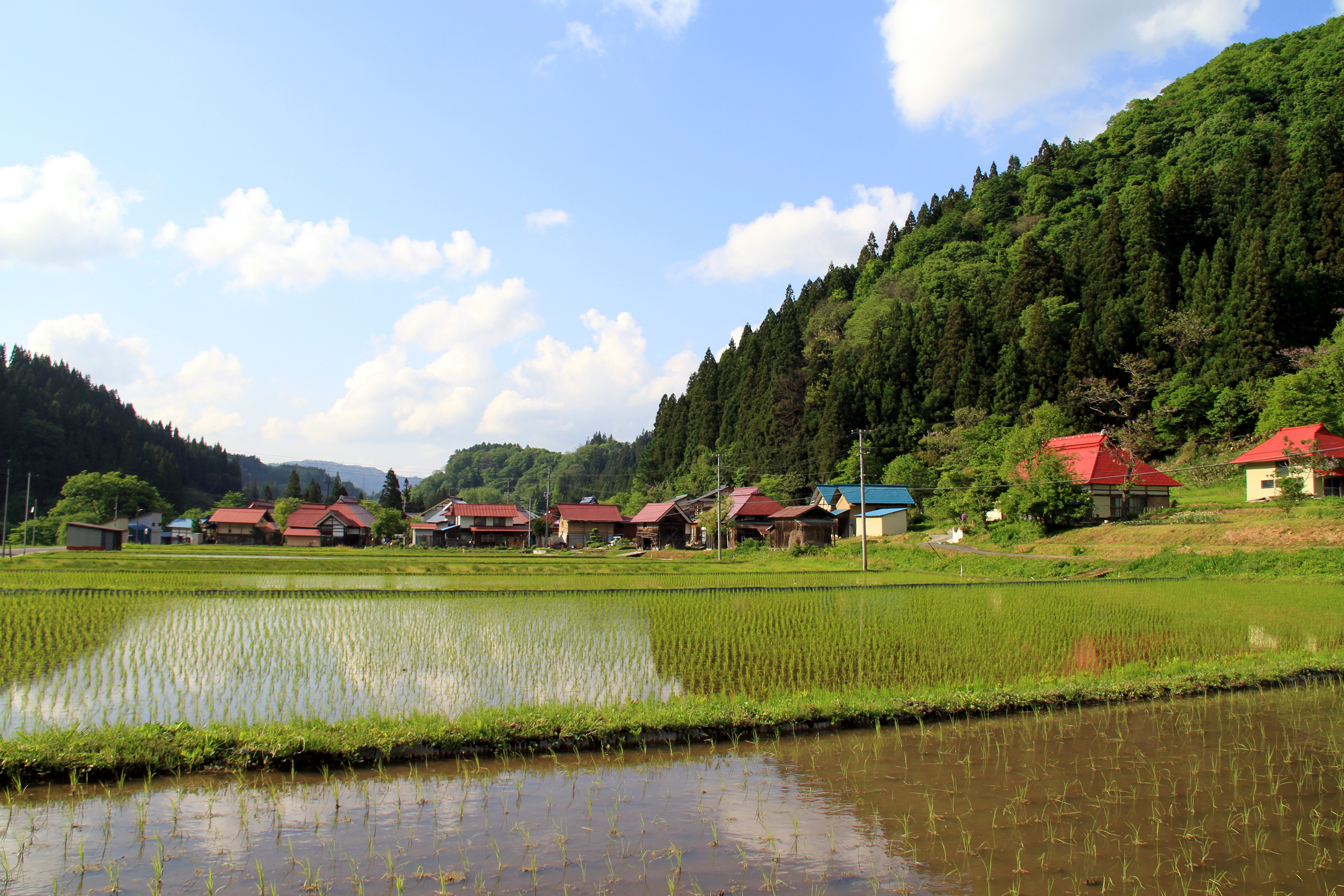
Rice paddies in Aizu in early summer

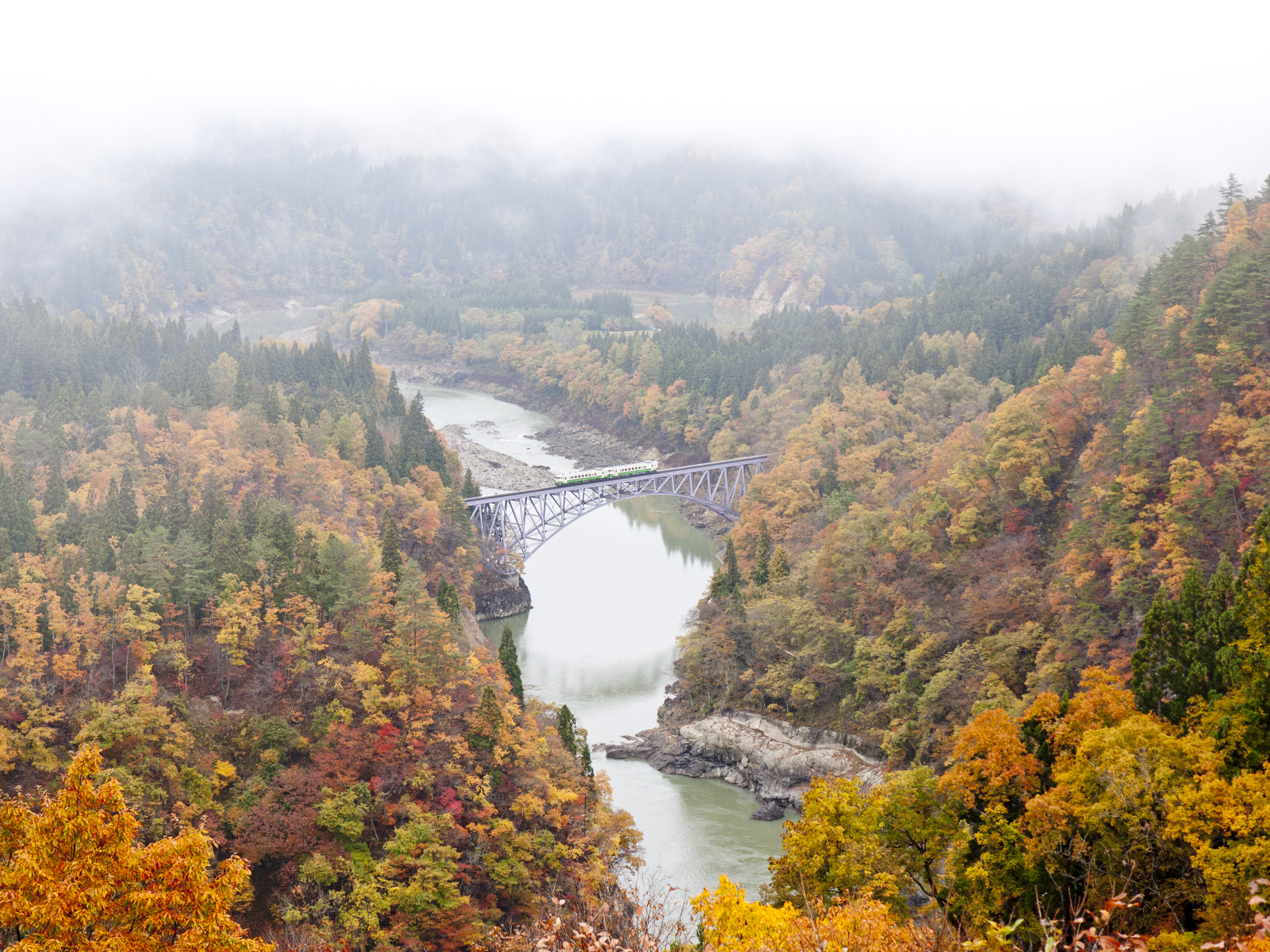
Tadami River and Tadami Line in autumn

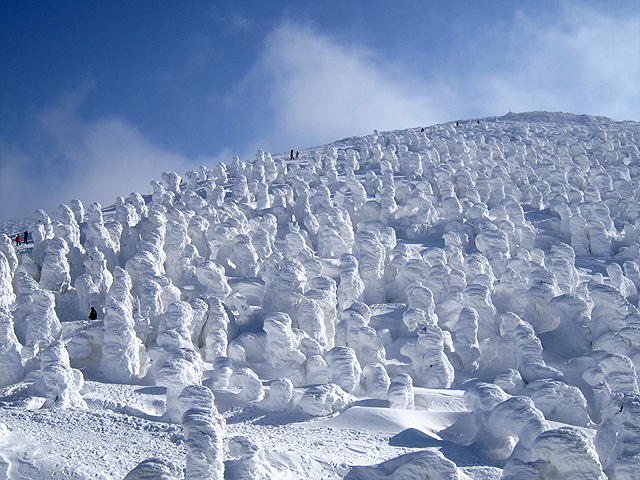
Snow monsters on Mount Zaō

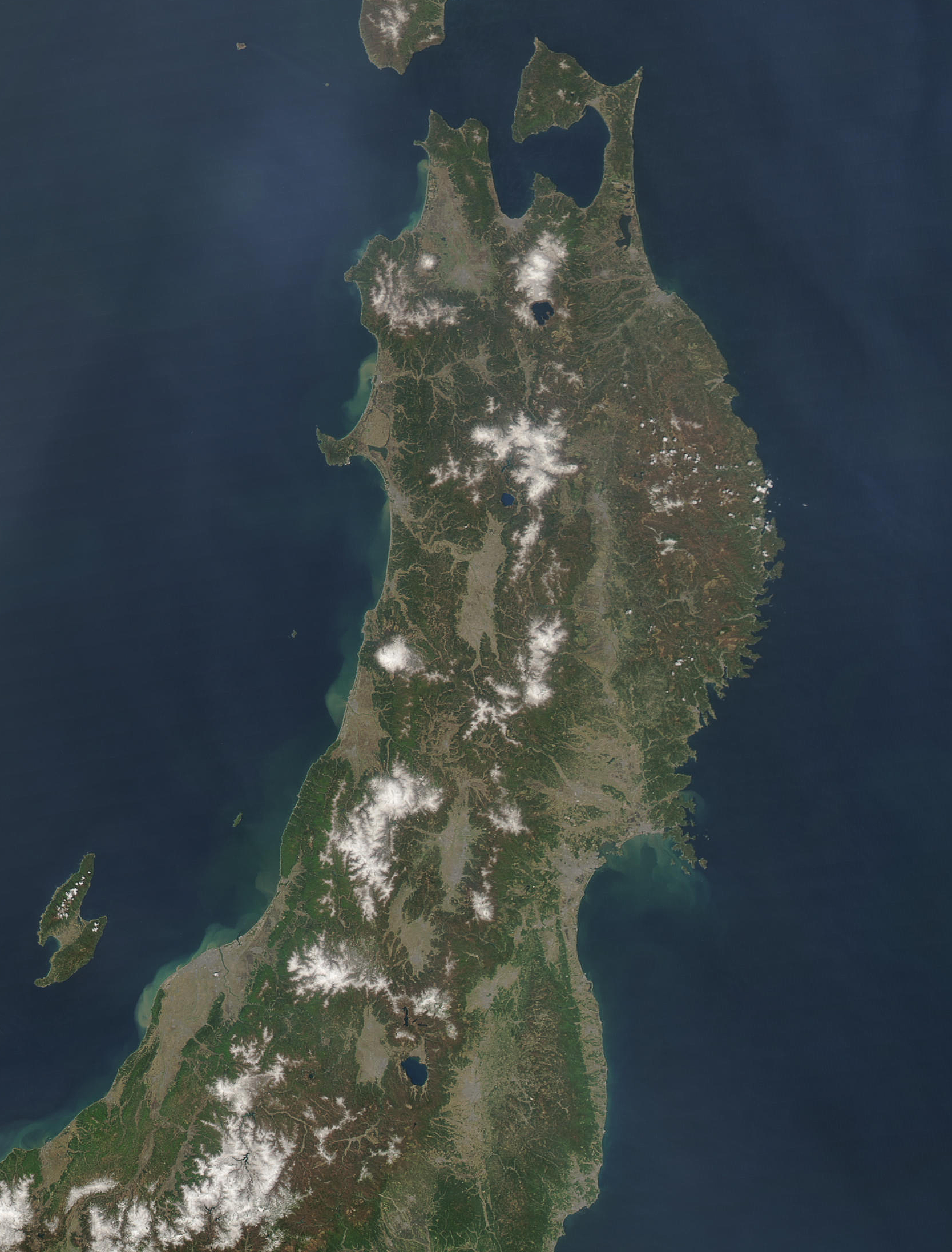
Satellite image of Tōhoku region

=== Subdivision ===
The most often used subdivision of the region is dividing it to "North Tōhoku" (北東北, Kita-Tōhoku) consisting of Aomori, Akita, and Iwate Prefectures and "South Tōhoku" (南東北, Minami-Tōhoku) consisting of Yamagata, Miyagi, and Fukushima Prefectures.

== Climate ==
The climate is colder than in other parts of Honshū due to the stronger effect of the Siberian High, and permits only one crop a year on paddy fields. The Pacific coast of Tōhoku, however, is generally much less snowy than the region's popular image and has among the smallest seasonal temperature variation in Japan. The city of Iwaki, for instance, has daily mean temperatures ranging from 3.0 °C (37.4 °F) in January to 23.9 °C (75.0 °F) in August.

== Cities and populated areas ==
=== Core cities ===
- Sendai (population: 1,098,000)
- Iwaki (population: 322,000)
- Kōriyama (population: 322,000)
- Akita (population: 300,000)
- Morioka (population: 284,000)
- Aomori (population: 265,000)
- Yamagata (population: 242,000)
- Hachinohe (population: 216,000)
Gallery

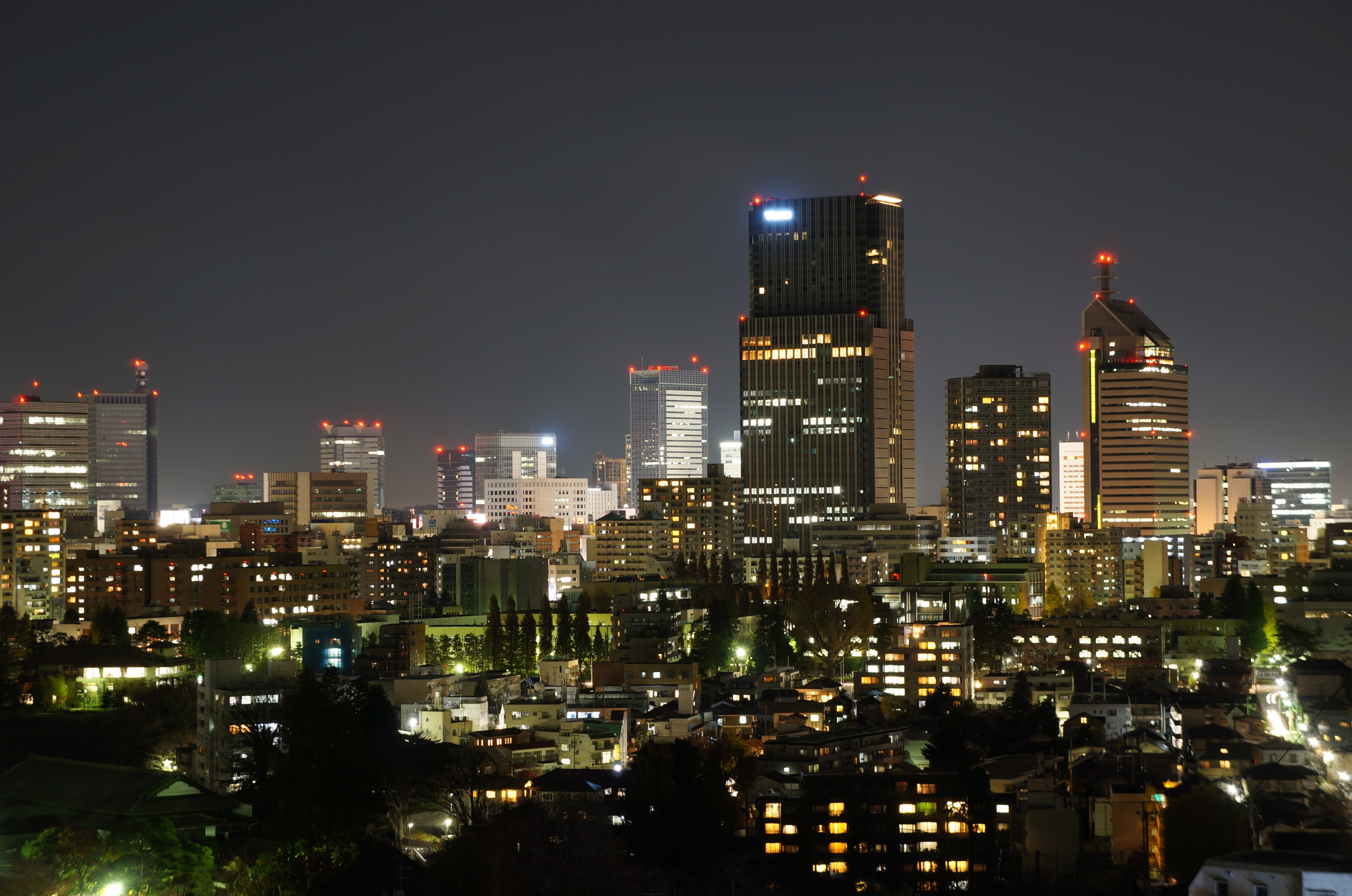
Sendai

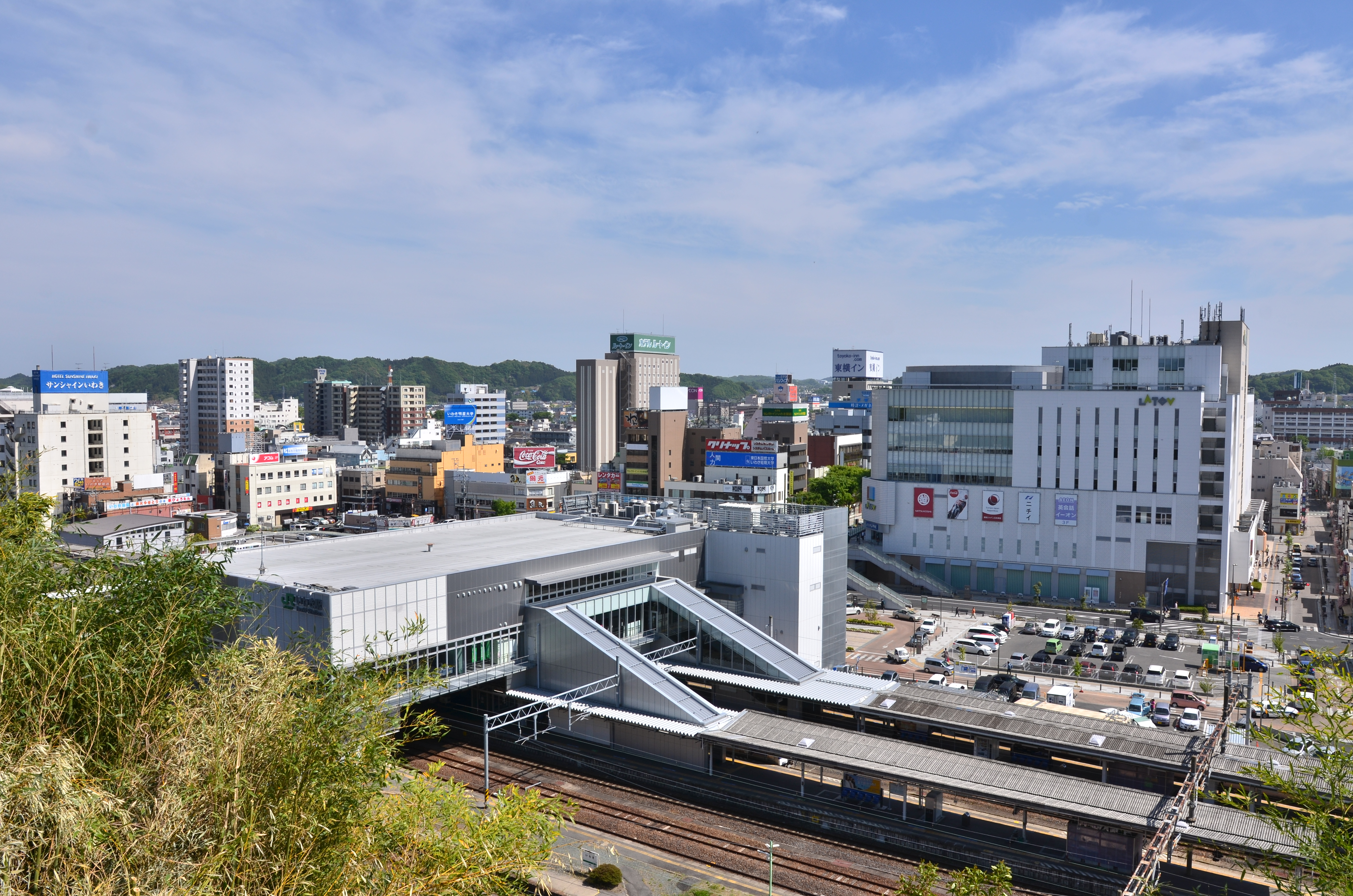
Iwaki

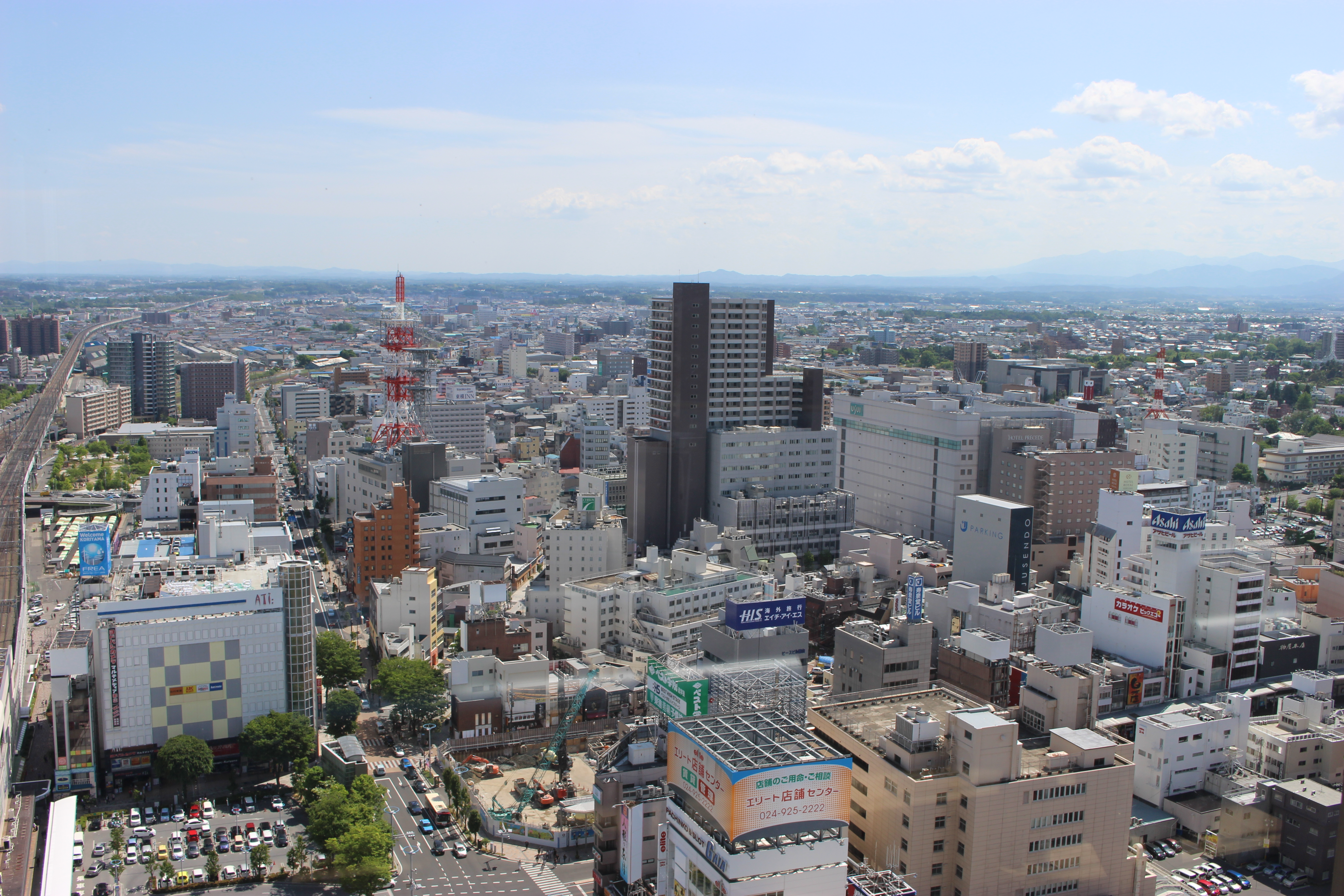
Kōriyama

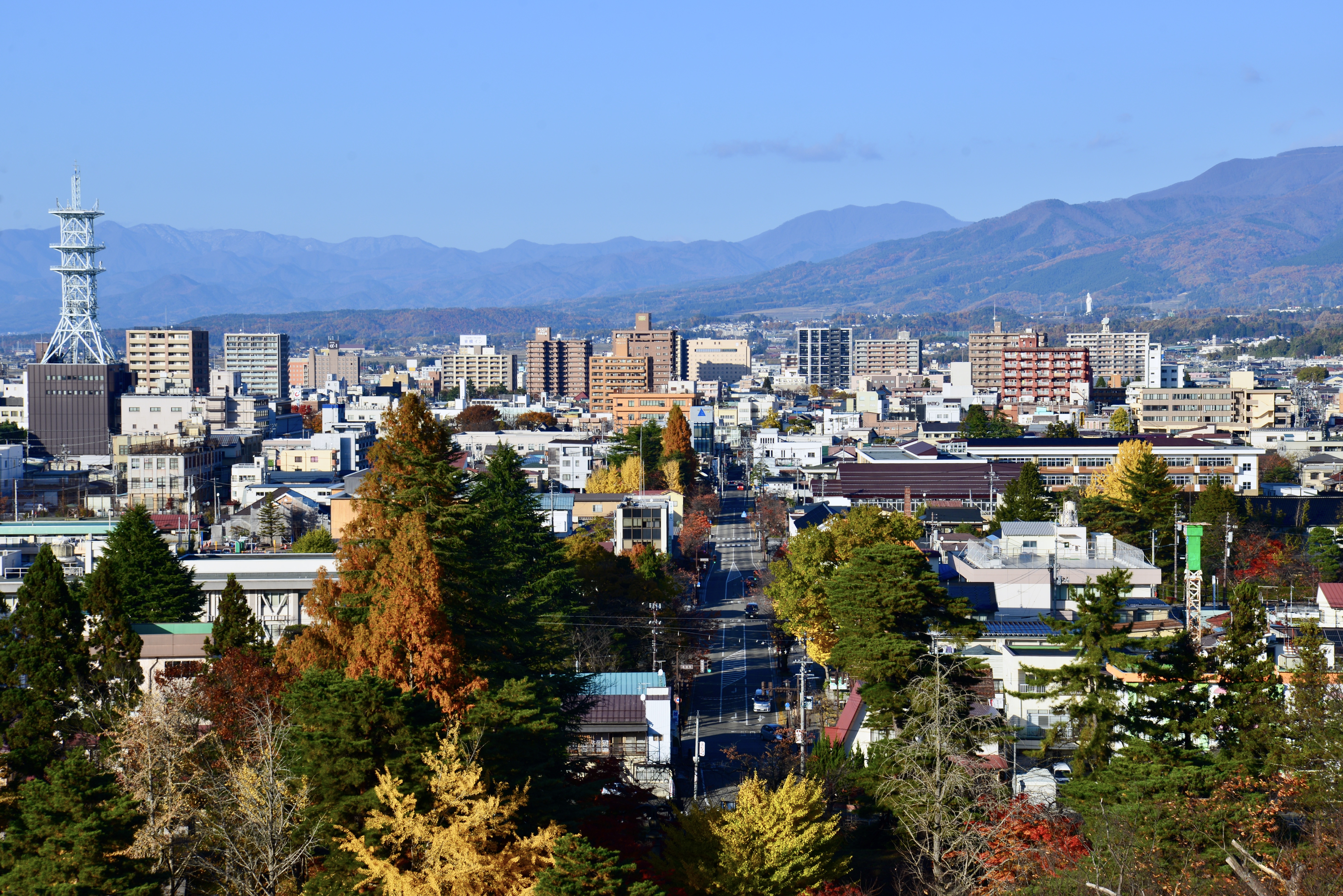
Aizuwakamatsu

=== Other cities ===
- Aizuwakamatsu
- Daisen
- Date
- Fukushima
- Goshogawara
- Hachimantai
- Hanamaki
- Hachinohe
- Higashimatsushima
- Higashine
- Hirakawa
- Hirosaki
- Ichinoseki
- Ishinomaki
- Iwanuma
- Kakuda
- Kamaishi
- Kaminoyama
- Katagami
- Kazuno
- Kesennuma
- Kitaakita
- Kitakami
- Kitakata
- Kuji
- Kurihara
- Kuroishi
- Minamisōma
- Misawa
- Miyako
- Motomiya
- Murayama
- Mutsu
- Nagai
- Nan'yō
- Natori
- Nihonmatsu
- Nikaho
- Ninohe
- Noshiro
- Obanazawa
- Oga
- Ōdate
- Ōfunato
- Ōsaki
- Ōshū
- Rikuzentakata
- Sagae
- Sakata
- Semboku
- Shinjō
- Shiogama
- Shirakawa
- Shiroishi
- Sōma
- Sukagawa
- Tagajō
- Takizawa
- Tamura
- Tendō
- Tome
- Tomiya
- Tōno
- Towada
- Tsugaru
- Tsuruoka
- Yamagata
- Yokote
- Yonezawa
- Yurihonjō
- Yuzawa

== Demographics ==
Historical population
Year	Pop.	±% p.a.
1884	3,957,085	—
1898	4,893,747	+1.53%
1920	5,793,974	+0.77%
1940	7,164,674	+1.07%
1950	9,021,809	+2.33%
1955	9,334,442	+0.68%
1970	9,031,197	−0.22%
1975	9,232,875	+0.44%
1980	9,572,088	+0.72%
1985	9,730,352	+0.33%
1990	9,738,284	+0.02%
1995	9,834,124	+0.20%
2000	9,817,589	−0.03%
2005	9,634,917	−0.37%
2010	9,335,636	−0.63%
2015	8,982,080	−0.77%
2020	8,611,195	−0.84%
2025	8,080,301	−1.26%
Note: All figures since 1920 are October. Source: Japan Census figures

The population decline of Tōhoku, which began before the year 2000, has accelerated, now including previously dynamic Miyagi. Despite this, Sendai City has grown, in part due to relocations of people affected by the 2011 disaster. The population decline of Aomori, Iwate and Akita Prefectures, Honshu's three northernmost, began in the early 1980s after an initial loss of population in the late 1950s. Fukushima Prefecture, prior to 1980, had traditionally been the most populated, but today Miyagi is the most populated and urban by far.

== Points of interest ==
=== Natural features ===
- Hakkōda Mountains
- Lake Tazawa
- Lake Towada
- Kitakami River
- The islands of Matsushima Bay
- Mount Bandai
- Mount Hayachine
- Mount Iwaki
- Mount Osore
- Oirase River Valley
- Sanriku Coast

=== Parks ===
- Bandai-Asahi National Park
- Miss Veedol Beach
- Sanriku Fukkō National Park
- Towada-Hachimantai National Park

=== Historical features ===
- Aizuwakamatsu Castle
- Chūson-ji
- Hirosaki Castle
- Mōtsū-ji
- Mount Osore
- Ōuchi-juku
- Three Mountains of Dewa
- Yama-dera

=== Onsen ===
- Iwaki Yumoto Onsen
- Ginzan Onsen
- Nyūtō Onsen
- Sukayu Onsen
- Zaō Onsen

=== Festivals ===
- Akita Kantō
- Aomori Nebuta Matsuri
- Goshogawara Tachineputa Festival
- Hachinohe Sansha Taisai
- Yamagata Hanagasa Festival
Gallery

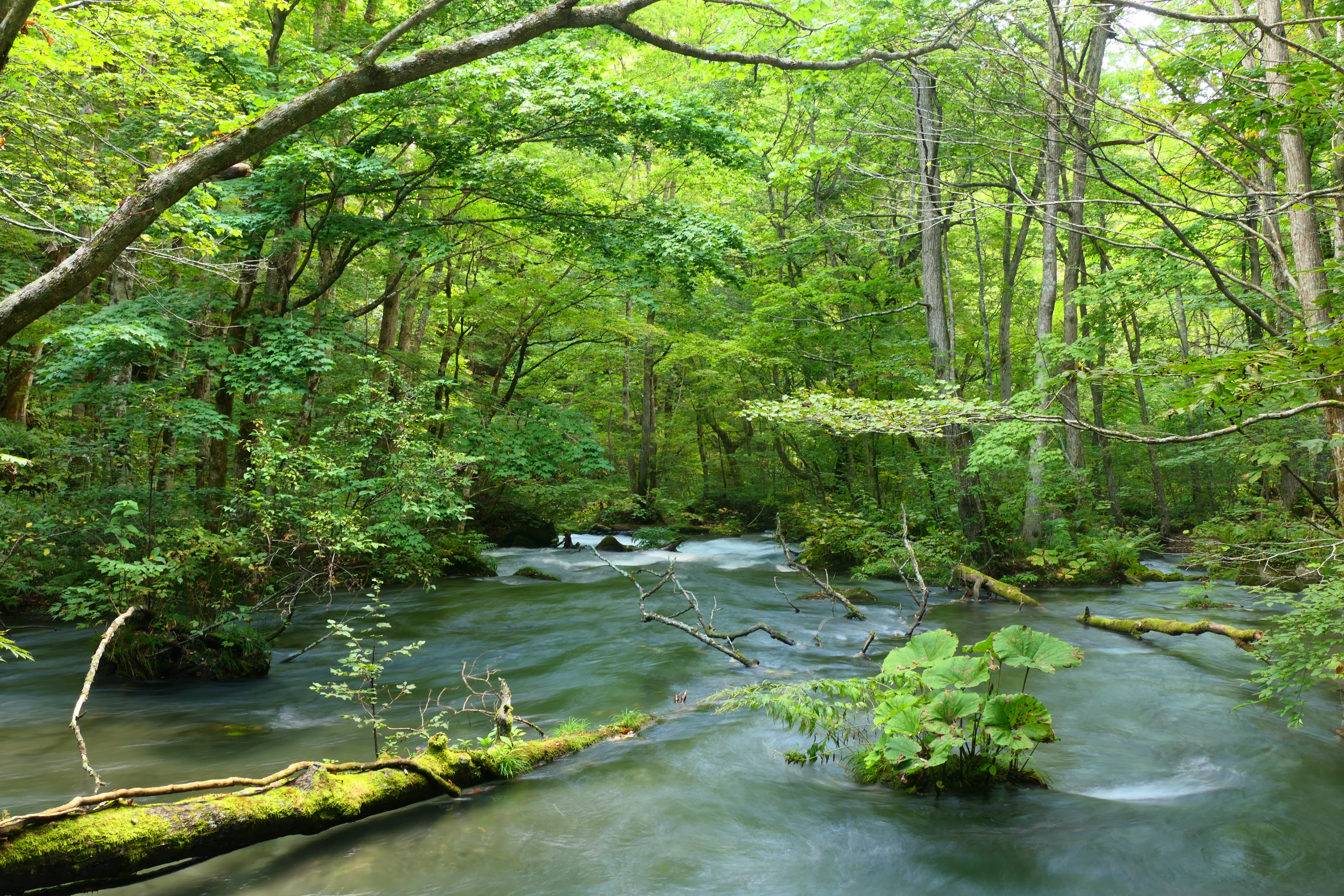
Oirase River in Aomori Prefecture

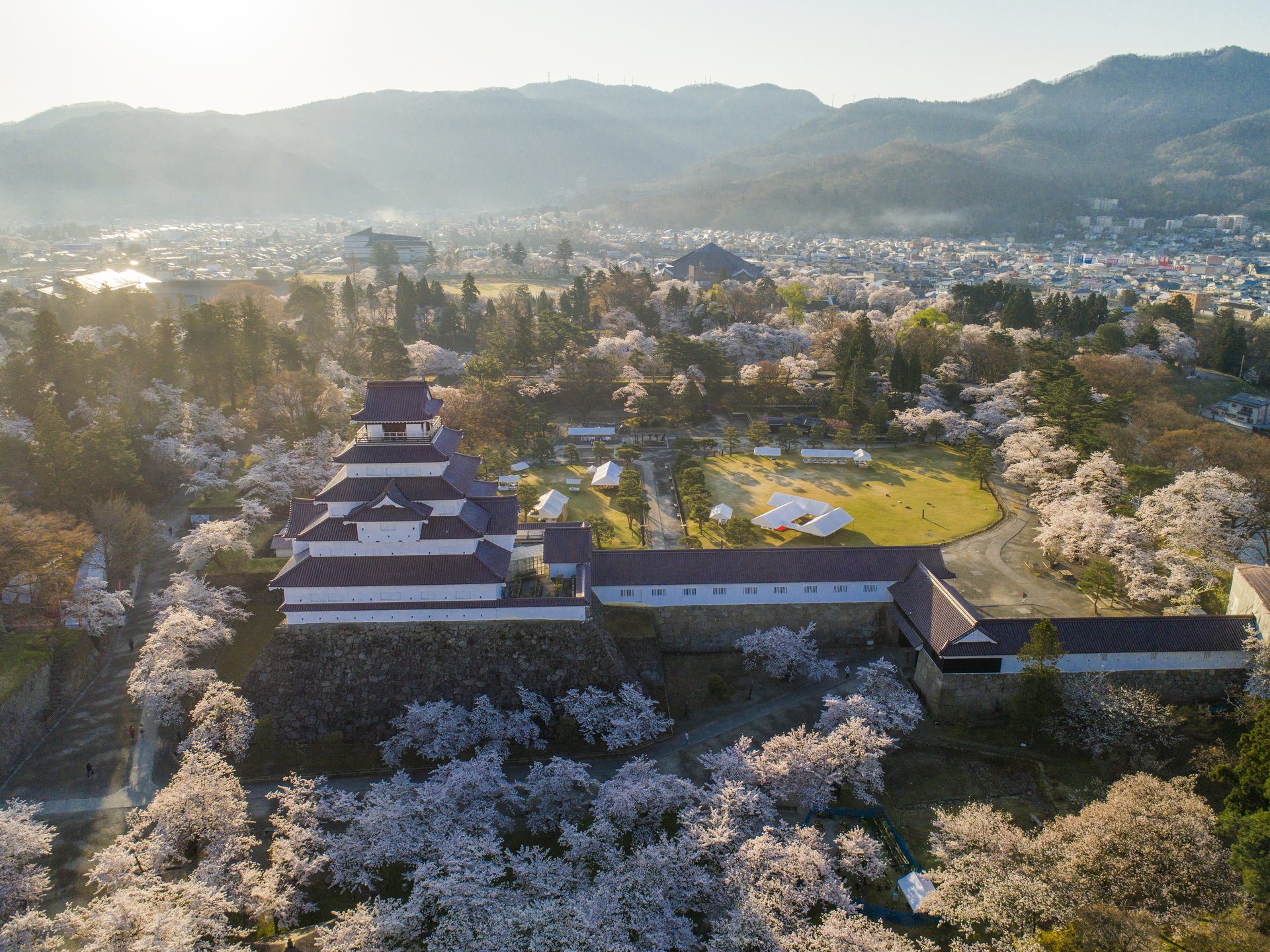
Aizuwakamatsu Castle in spring

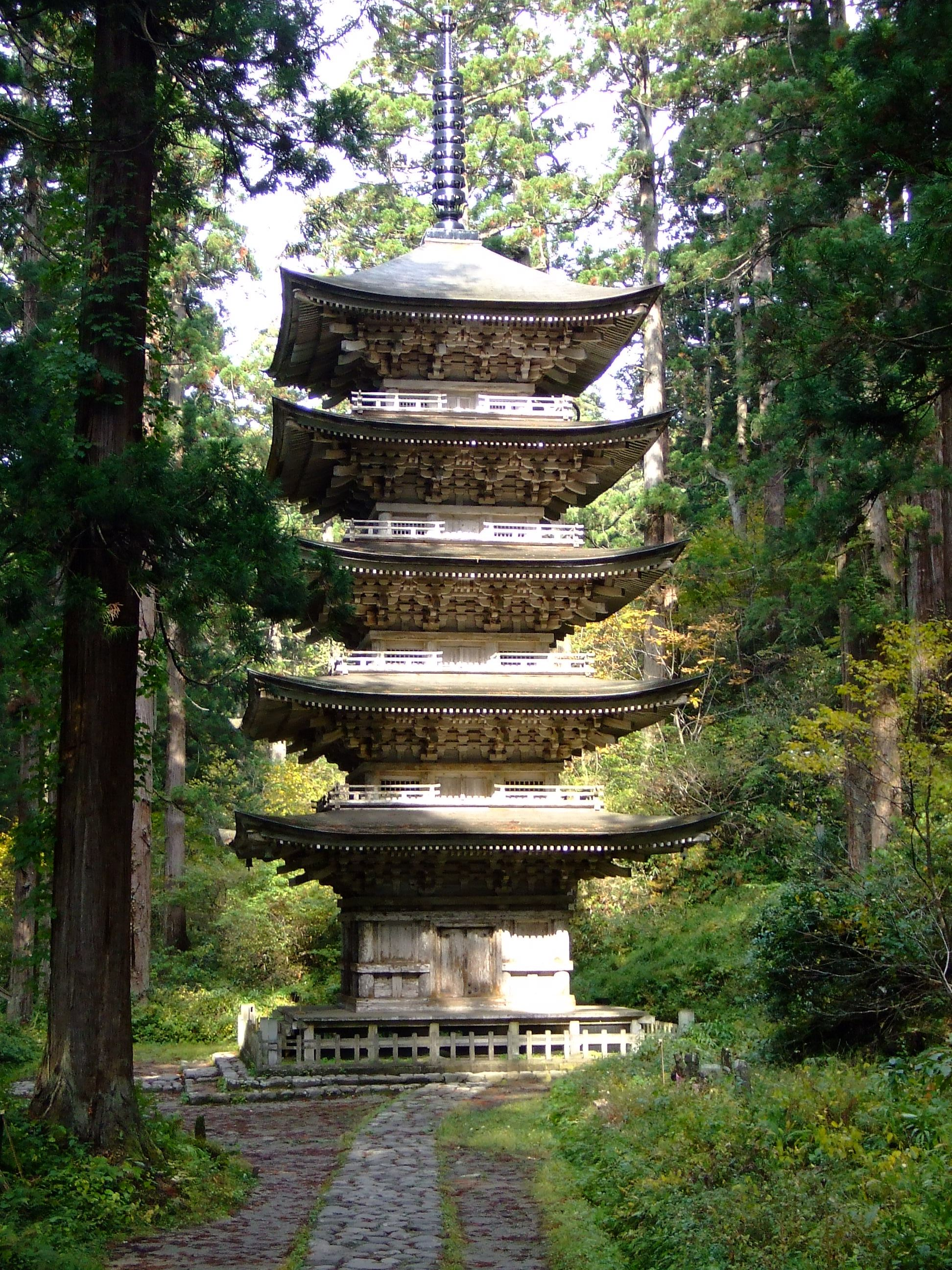
Mount Haguro

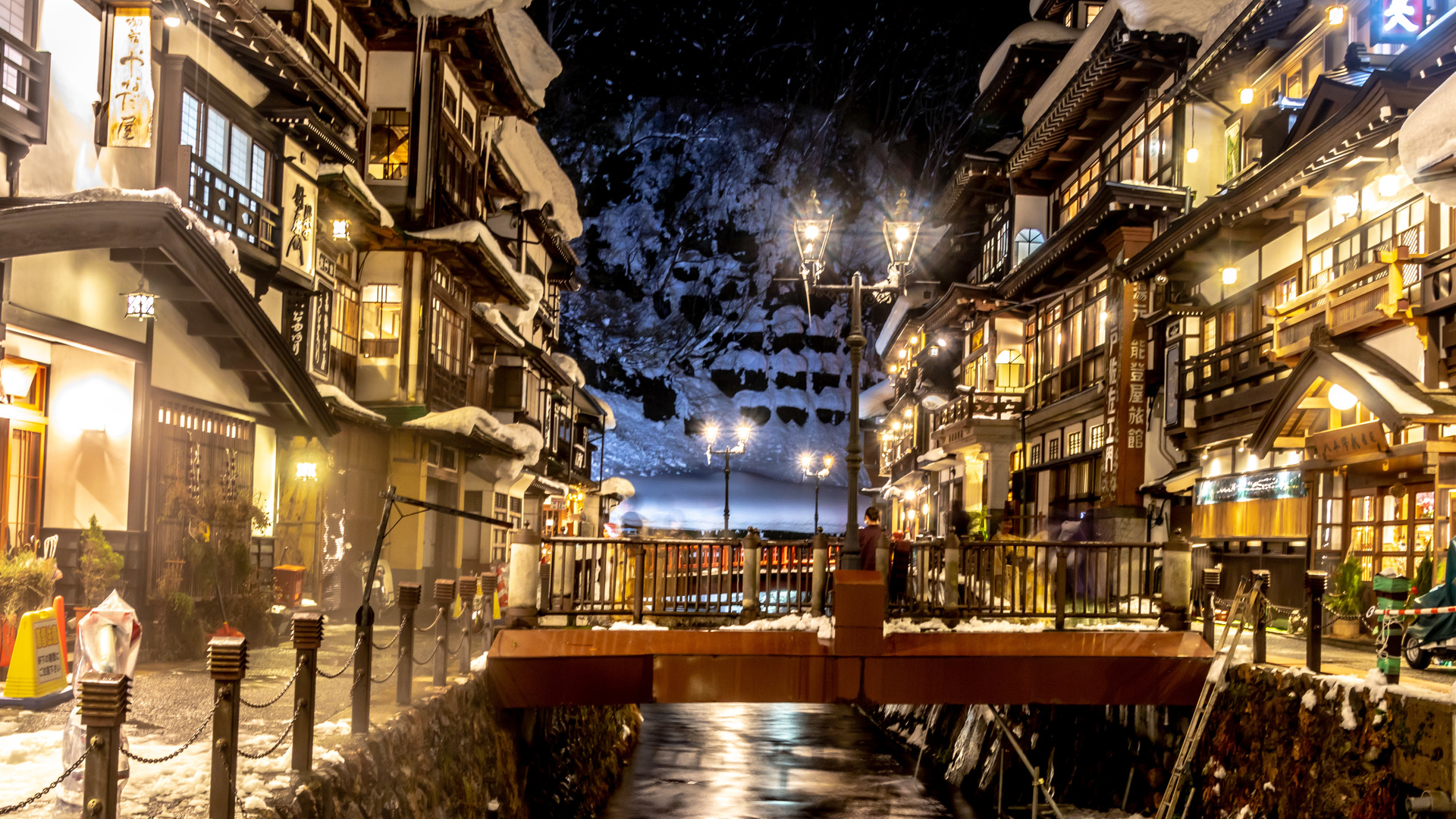
Ginzan Onsen

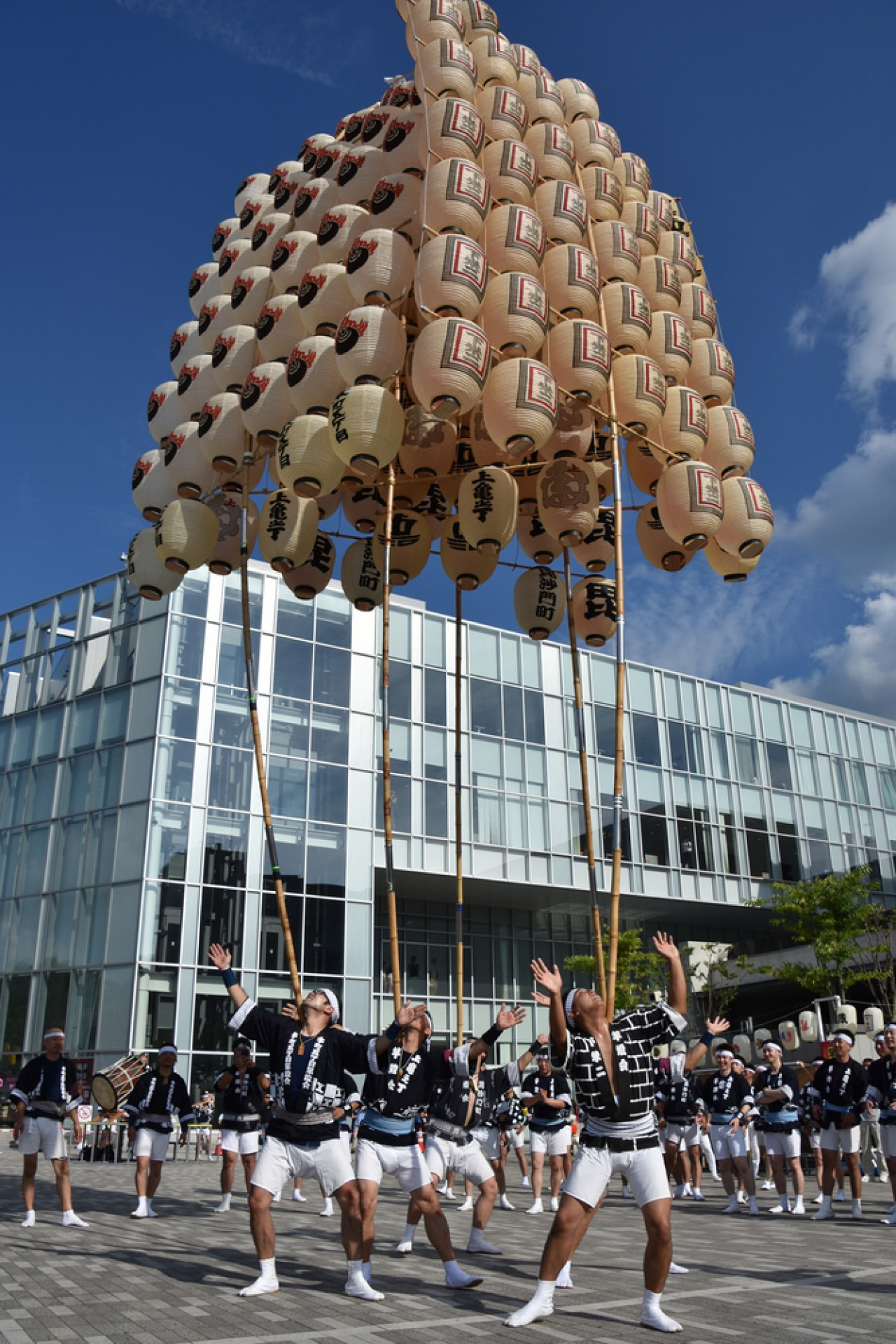
Akita Kantō Festival

== See also ==
- 2006 Kuril Islands earthquake
- 2011 Tōhoku earthquake and tsunami
- List of regions of Japan
- Geography of Japan
- Tōhoku dialect
