= Ichi =

- Ichi, the number one in Japanese numerals
- Ichi (film), a 2008 Japanese film
- Ichi (scarification), a type of facial scarring traditionally used by the Igbo people of West Africa
- Ichi, Iran, a village in Isfahan Province, Iran
- Ichi, Nigeria, a town in Ekwusigo Local Government Area, Nigeria
- International Classification of Health Interventions
- Ichiro Suzuki or Ichi (born 1973), Japanese baseball player
- ICHI (musician), musician and husband of Rachael Dadd
- IChI (IUPAC chemical identifier), the original name for the International Chemical Identifier

== See also ==
- Ichi the Killer (disambiguation)
- Ichiban (disambiguation)
