= Daichi =

Daichi may refer to:

- the JAXA's Advanced Land Observation Satellite (a.k.a. Daichi)
- Daichi (given name), a Japanese given name
- Daichi, Iran (disambiguation), places in Iran

== See also ==
- Daiichi
