= Yoshi Ikuzō =

- Also known as: Eiji Yamaoka, IKZO, Kumanosuke Kitami
- Born: Yoshihito Kamata; November 11, 1952（age 71） Kanagi, Aomori, Japan
- Genres: Enka
- Occupations: Enka singer Singer-songwriter; Lyricist; Composer; Rapper
- Instruments: Vocal guitar
- Years active: 1973 –
- Label: Tokuma Japan Communications
- Website: Official site
- Education: Kanagi Minami Junior High School
- Children: KU
- Father: Inakazu Kamata

Yoshi Ikuzō (吉幾三; born 11 November 1952, Goshogawara, Aomori) is the stage name of Yoshihito Kamata (鎌田 善人, Kamata Yoshihito), a Japanese enka singer-songwriter.

He has released several popular albums of enka music, a genre akin to Japanese folk or blues music in the Western world. Amongst his most famous hits are "Sake yo", "Suika", and "Yuki Guni". Additionally, he is self-described as the "first popular hip hop artist in Japan" due to the 1984 release of "Ora Tōkyō sa Iguda" (lit. "I'm going to Tokyo"), sung in his native Tsugaru dialect of Japanese. He has been on tour with fellow Japanese star Fukui Kodai.

Ikuzō is married. His wife is named Hisako, and they have a daughter, Ikumi.

His stage name is a pun for the common Japanese phrase "Yoshi, ikuzo!" (よし、いくぞー！, Alright, let's go!).

== Selected Discography ==
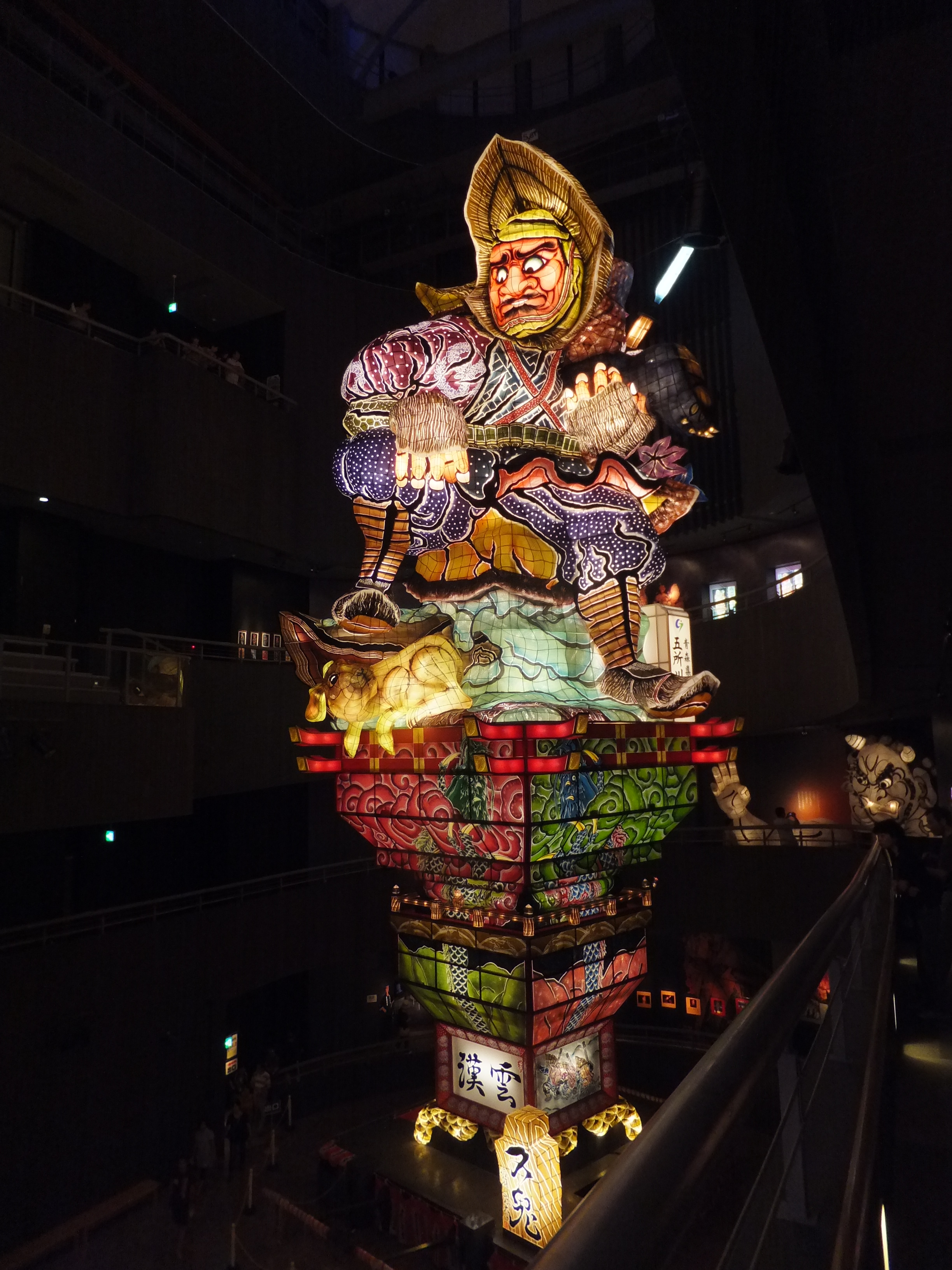
Tachineputa float

- Ora ha zettai! Presley: I'm an "Elvis Presley" indeed!
- Ora Tōkyō sa Iguda: A farewell to the Rural
- Yuki Guni: Snow Country
- Sake yo: Sipping and drinking
- Suika: Drunken Song
- Dream
- Shutcho Monogatari: My Dekasegi memories
- Tachineputa
- Kaze ni Fukarete: Blown with the wind
- Tsugaru

== Filmography ==
=== Film ===
- Heaven Sent (1979)
- I Go to Tokyo (1985)
- Cape Nostalgia (2014), Teacher Yukiyoshi

=== Television ===
- Reach Beyond the Blue Sky (2021), Tokugawa Ieyoshi
