= Daichi (given name) =

- Gender: Male
- Language: Japanese

Origin
- Origin: Japanese

Daichi (written: 大地, 大知, 大治 or 大智) is a masculine Japanese given name. Notable people with the name include:

- Daichi Abe (阿部 大治; born 1991), Japanese mixed martial artist
- Daichi Akiyama (秋山 大地; born 1994), Japanese football player
- Daichi Azegami (畔上 大地; born 1974), Japanese cross-country skier
- Daichi Banjou (万乗 大智; born 1969), Japanese manga artist
- Daichi Hara (原 大智; born 1997), Japanese freestyle skier and professional racing cyclist
- Daichi Hashimoto (橋本 大地; born 1992), Japanese professional wrestler & son of Shinya Hashimoto
- Daichi Hayashi (林 大地; born 1997), Japanese footballer
- Daichi Inui (乾 大知; born 1989), Japanese football player
- Daichi Ishii (石井 大智; born 1997), Japanese professional baseball pitcher
- Daichi Ishikawa (石川 大地; born 1996), Japanese footballer
- Daichi Kakimoto (柿本 大地; born 1983), Japanese retired professional wrestler
- Daichi Kamada (鎌田 大地; born 1996), Japanese footballer
- Daichi Kamino (神野 大地; born 1993), Japanese long-distance runner
- Daichi Kaneko (金子 大地; born 1996), Japanese actor
- Daichi Kawashima (川島 大地; born 1986), Japanese football player
- Daichi Kitakata (北方 大地; born 1991), Japanese mixed martial artist
- Daichi Kobayashi (小林 大智; born 1999), Japanese footballer
- Daichi Komuro (小室 大地; born 1988), Japanese handball player
- Daichi Matsuoka (松岡 大智; born 1999), Japanese football player
- Daichi Matsuyama (松山 大地; born 1974), Japanese former football player
- Daichi Miura (三浦 大知; born 1987), Japanese singer and dancer
- Daichi Miyata (宮田 大地; born 1996), Japanese former figure skater
- Daichi Oguri (小栗 大地; born 1981), Japanese para snowboarder
- Daichi Okumiya (屋宮 大地; born 1988), Japanese former football player
- Daichi Osera (大瀬良 大地; born 1991), Japanese professional baseball pitcher
- Daichi Sasaki (佐々木 大地; born 1995), Japanese shogi player
- Daichi Sawano (澤野 大地; born 1980), Japanese pole vaulter
- Daichi Shimoyama (下山 大地; born 1989), Japanese basketball player
- Daichi Soga (曽我 大地; born 1998), Japanese football player
- Daichi Sokei (大智祖継; 1290–1366), Japanese Sōtō Zen monk
- Daichi Sugimoto (杉本 大地; born 1993), Japanese footballer
- Daichi Suzuki (鈴木 大地; born 1967), Japanese swimmer
- Daichi Suzuki (baseball) (鈴木 大地; born 1989), Japanese baseball player
- Daichi Tagami (田上 大地; born 1993), Japanese football player
- Daichi Takatani (高谷 大地; born 1994), Japanese freestyle wrestler
- Daichi Takeyasu (竹安 大知; born 1994), Japanese professional baseball player
- Daichi Tani (谷 大地; born 2008), Japanese professional footballer
- Daichi Taniguchi (谷口 大智; born 1990), Japanese professional basketball player
- Daichi Yamamoto (山本 大地; born 1991), Japanese politician
- Daichi Yamanaka (山中 大地; born 1990), Japanese speed skater

== Fictional characters ==
- Daichi (ダイチ), a character from Shugo Chara!
- Daichi Aoi (葵 大地) (Clay Terran), a character from the video game Phoenix Wright: Ace Attorney - Dual Destinies
- Daichi Bunta (大地 文太), a character from J.A.K.Q. Dengekitai
- Daichi Hayami (速水 大地), a character from Machine Robo Rescue
- Daichi Ishizaki (石崎 大地), a character from Classroom of the Elite
- Daichi Kitazawa (北沢 大地), a character from Kitchen Princess
- Daichi Misawa (三沢 大地), a character from Yu-Gi-Oh! GX
- Daichi Oozora (大空 大地), a character from Ultraman X
- Daichi Sawamura (澤村 大地), the team captain of the Karasuno Volleyball team in the sports anime Haikyuu!! (2015)
- Daichi Shijima (志島 大地), a character from the video game Shin Megami Tensei: Devil Survivor 2
- Daichi Shinagawa (品川 大地), a character from Flunk Punk Rumble
- Daichi Shinozaki (篠崎 大地), a character from the Japanese television adaptation of Good Morning Call
- Daichi Sumeragi (皇 大地), a character from Beyblade G-Revolution
- Daichi Tokugawa, a character from Astro Boy (2003)
- Daichi Yamagata (山形 大地), a character from Kousoku Sentai Turboranger
- Daichi Yatsuhashi, a character from RWBY

== See also ==
- Daichi (disambiguation)
- Dai-ichi (also transliterated "daiichi")
- Advanced Land Observation Satellite, nicknamed "Daichi"
