= Daichi, Iran =

Daichi (Persian: دايي چي) may refer to:

- Daichi, Kermanshah
- Daichi, Lorestan
