= Tachineputa Museum =

- 立佞武多の館
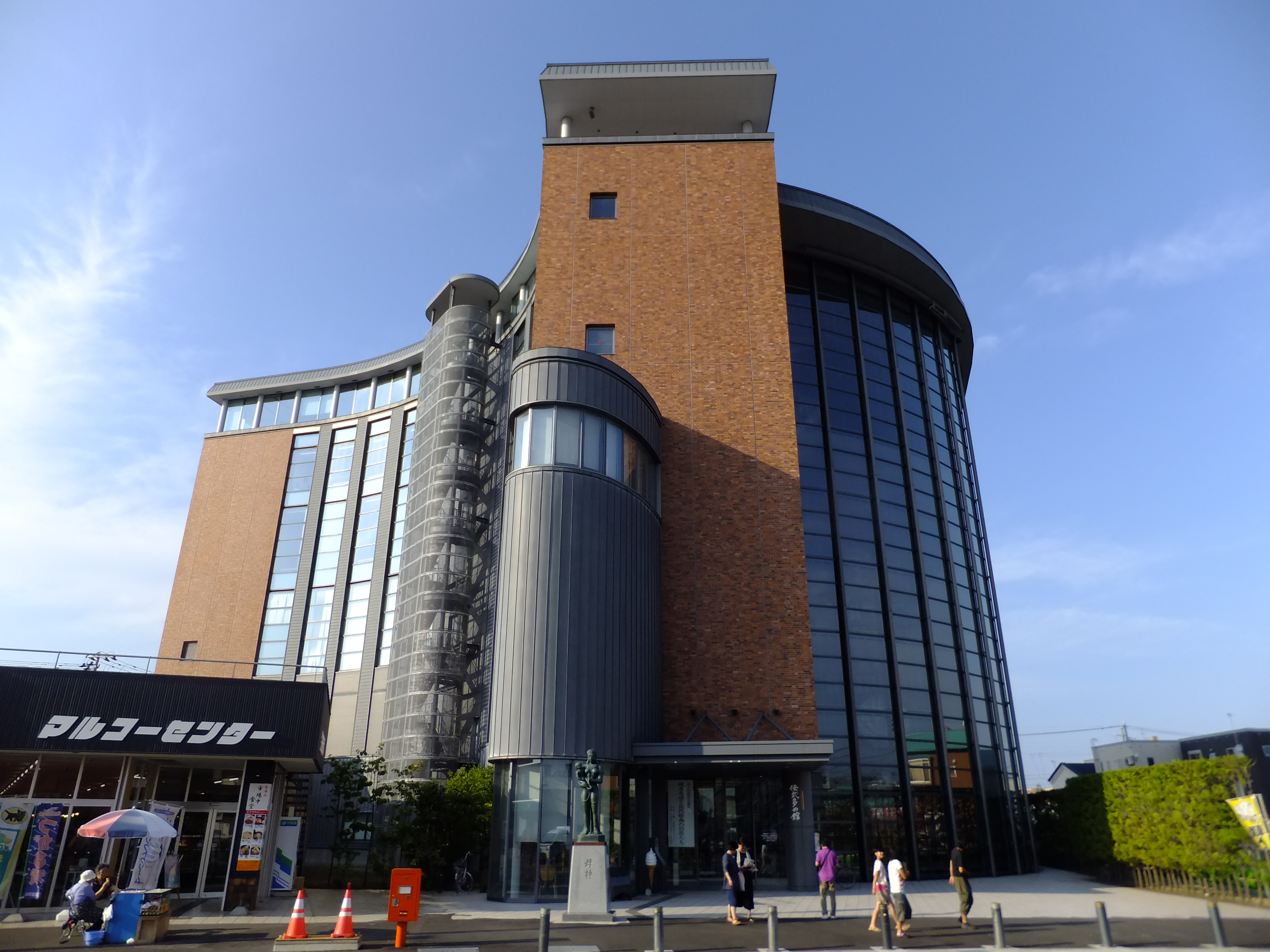
- Tachineputa Museum

- Location within Aomori Prefecture Location within Japan
- Established: 1996
- Location: Goshogawara, Aomori, Japan
- Coordinates: 40.8109°N 140.4433°E
- Website: www.tachineputa.jp/index.php

The Tachineputa Museum (立佞武多の館, Tachineputa no Yakata) is a museum located in the city of Goshogawara, Aomori Prefecture, Japan.

The museum has exhibits related to Goshogawara's Tachineputa Festival, which is held every August. It houses three tachineputa floats, as well as a production studio where visitors can see the creation process of the floats. The museum also has a gallery with works created by Aomori artists.
