= Ora Tōkyō sa Iguda =

Single by Yoshi Ikuzō
- Released: November 25, 1984
- Recorded: 1984
- Genre: Kayōkyoku
- Length: 3:05
- Label: Tokuma Japan Communications Co., Ltd.
- Songwriter: Yoshi Ikuzō
- Producer: Masao Sen

Yoshi Ikuzō singles chronology
"'Tsugaruheiya" (1984)	"Ora Tōkyō sa Iguda" (1984)	"Gegege no Kitaro" (1985)

"Ora Tōkyō sa Iguda" (俺ら東京さ行ぐだ Ora Tōkyō sa iguda, "I'm going to Tokyo") is a song written and sung by the Japanese singer Yoshi Ikuzō, with lyrics in his native Tsugaru dialect. It was released on November 25, 1984. In the song, the singer declares that he will leave his small hometown in the countryside to move to Tokyo. The singer expresses frustration at his town's lack of modern conveniences, stating that there are no televisions, radios, pianos, bars, phones, drugstores, movies, newspapers, magazines, traffic lights, or even electricity.

== Reception ==
The song was received positively, reaching 21st place on the Oricon Albums Chart in 1985 and 4th in the weekly chart. The song was criticized by some who lived in rural areas saying that things were not as underdeveloped as described in the song, to which Ikuzō stated that the lyrics "Ain't no TV, radio, telephone, gas, or electricity" described what life was actually like in his hometown of Kanagi (present day Goshogawara) when he was young.

== Movie ==
The song served as the basis for a comedy film by the same name in 1985 produced and distributed by Shochiku. The plot of the movie involves a fight between a son who lives and works in Tokyo as a photographer's assistant and his parents. Ikuzō made a cameo appearance as a taxi driver.

== See also ==
- 1984 in Japanese music
