= Daichi, Kermanshah =

Daichi دايي چي
- Village
- Location within Iran
- Coordinates: 34°23′42″N 46°53′36″E
- Country: Iran
- Province: Kermanshah
- County: Kermanshah
- Bakhsh: Central
- Rural District: Baladarband

Population (2006)
  - Total: 167
- Time zone: UTC+3:30 (IRST)
  - Summer (DST): UTC+4:30 (IRDT)

Daichi (Persian: دايي چي, also Romanized as Dā'īchī) is a village in Baladarband Rural District, in the Central District of Kermanshah County, Kermanshah Province, Iran. At the 2006 census, its population was 167, in 42 families.
