= Ichi the Killer =

Ichi the Killer may refer to:

- Ichi the Killer (film), a 2001 Japanese film based on the manga series of the same name
- Ichi the Killer (manga), a manga series written and illustrated by Hideo Yamamoto
