= Dai-ichi =

Dai-ichi (第一) is a compound modifier phrase of Japanese origin, meaning number one, or first. In kanji, "dai" ("number") is 第 and "ichi" ("one") is 一. "Dai" is also defined "ordinal number marker." It is this feature that makes the phrase a modifier, or an adjective, describing a noun, as first. Number one functions in the same way.

The phrase is also written without the hyphen, as daiichi.

Dai-ichi is frequently used in proper names, hence capitalized; also Dai-Ichi and occasionally Dai Ichi. There is a sound-alike common first name with different spelling.

Uses include but are not limited to:

- Fukushima Daiichi Nuclear Power Plant (or Fukushima Dai-ichi), a.k.a. Fukushima I Nuclear Power Plant (福島第一原子力発電所) (dai and ichi are the third and fourth characters) – a six-unit nuclear plant complex struck in the March 11, 2011 Tōhoku earthquake and tsunami
- Dai-ichi Life Insurance Co (第一生命保険株式会社) – the third largest life insurer in Japan by revenues
- Dai Ichi Daihoumaru Ship case (第一大邦丸事件) – a 1952 incident between the South Korean Coast Guard and the Japanese ship Dai Ichi Daihoumaru
- Dai-Ichi Kangyo Bank (第一勧業銀行) – was one of the largest banks in the world during the latter half of the 20th century
- Dai-ichi KōKū Kantai (第一航空艦隊) (dai and ichi are the first and second characters) – 1st Air Fleet of the Imperial Japanese Navy; amongst a number of military-unit names incorporating the phrase
- Dai-ichi Hōsō – The 1st Broadcast (第1放送) (dai is first character; ichi is the numeral "1" instead of 一) on Radio Nikkei carries general programs and horse racing from eastern Japan (hōsō; click link to edit listing)
- Dai-Ichi-dōri Station (第一通り駅) – a commuter station in downtown Hamamatsu city (dōri)
- Morioka Dai-ichi High School, a.k.a. Morioka First High School (盛岡第一高等学校) – is a public university preparatory high school in Morioka city, Iwate, Japan
- Daiichi Sankyo (第一三共株式会社) (Dai and ichi are the first and second characters) – a Japan-based major pharmaceutical company
- Daiichi Institute of Technology (第一工業大学) – a private university in Kirishima, Kagoshima, Japan
- Dai-ichi was the name of a professional Go tournament 1959–75
- Shizuoka Daiichi Television, a television station in Shizuoka Prefecture, Japan
- Daiichi Ruby, a Japanese racehorse

== Related phrases ==
Dai-ni (第二) means number two or second, using two parallel bars (二) or "2" for "ni"; also daini

Examples
- Fukushima Daini Nuclear Power Plant, a.k.a. Fukushima II Nuclear Power Plant, (福島第二原子力発電所) (dai and ni are the third and fourth characters), Fukushima Dai-Ni Genshiryoku Hatsudensho, Fukushima II NPP, 2F or "Fukushima Daini" – a four-unit nuclear plant complex seven miles south of the Dai-Ichi plants and also struck in the March 11, 2011 Tōhoku earthquake and tsunami
- Radio Nikkei's 2nd Broadcast (第2放送) (dai is first character; ni is the numeral "2" instead of 二) (Dai-ni Hōsō) carries live company stock price announcement and horse racing from western Japan; Radio Nikkei is Japan's domestic shortwave commercial radio broadcasting station

Dai-san (第三) means number three or third, using three parallel bars (三) or "3" for "san"

Examples
- Kyōto 3rd district (京都府第3区)
- "the third beer" (第三のビール) (dai-san no bīru) – beer-flavored beverages developed to compete with Happoshu or low-malt beer

And continuing for 4, 5, 6, etc.

== See also ==
- Dai (disambiguation)
- Ichiban (disambiguation), Japanese for "number one" or "best"
