= Daichi, Lorestan =

Daichi دائي چي
- Village
- Location within Iran
- Coordinates: 33°38′42″N 48°59′33″E
- Country: Iran
- Province: Lorestan
- County: Dorud
- Bakhsh: Silakhor
- Rural District: Silakhor

Population (2006)
  - Total: 227
- Time zone: UTC+3:30 (IRST)
  - Summer (DST): UTC+4:30 (IRDT)

Daichi (Persian: دائي چي, also Romanized as Dā’īchī and Dāychī) is a village in Silakhor Rural District, Silakhor District, Dorud County, Lorestan province, Iran. At the 2006 census, its population was 227, in 54 families.
