= Fukushima Daiichi Nuclear Power Plant =

Disabled nuclear power plant in Japan

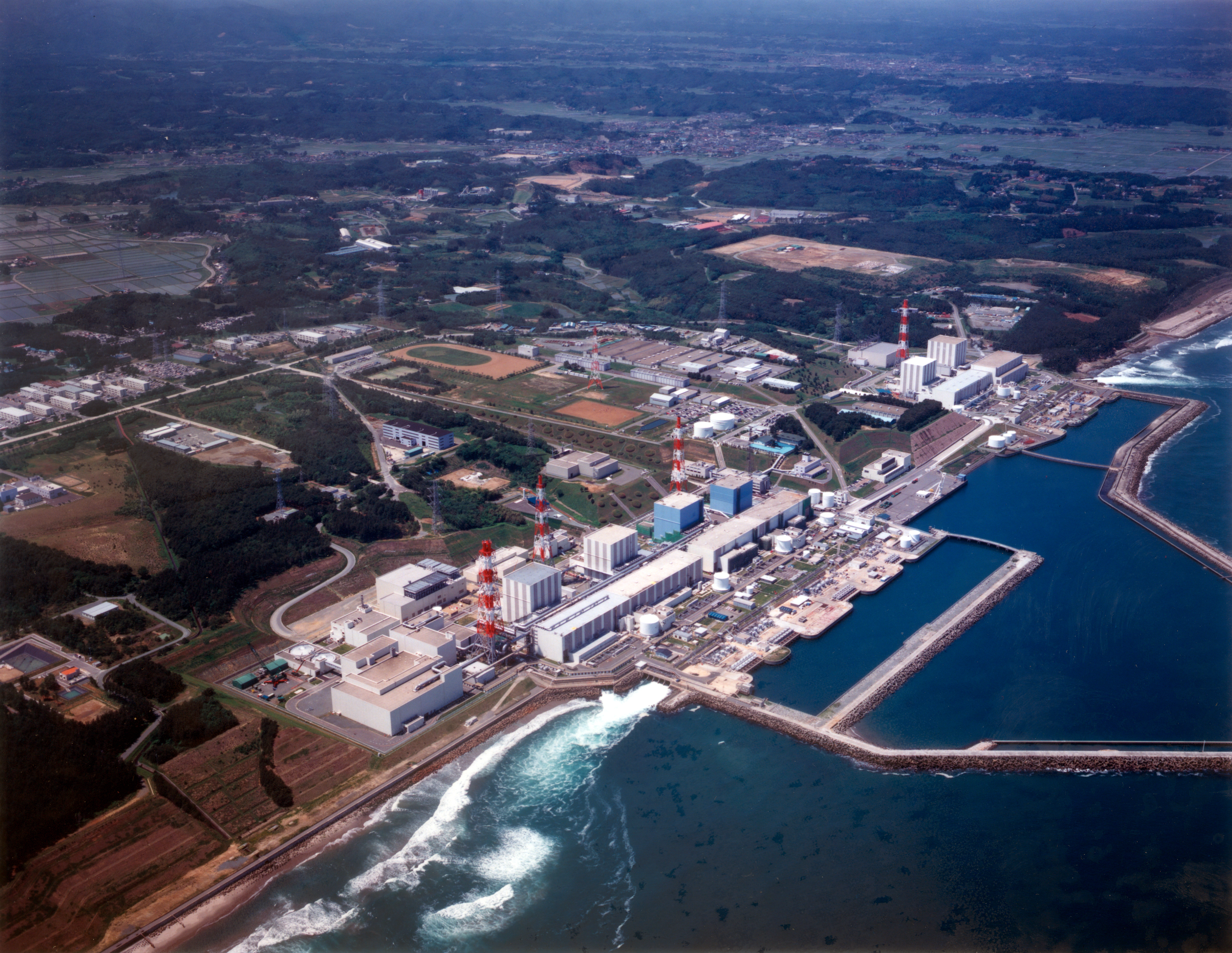
- Aerial photo from 2007, before the nuclear accident in 2011
- Country: Japan
- Location: Ōkuma, Fukushima
- Coordinates: 37°25′23″N 141°01′59″E
- Status: Being decommissioned
- Construction began: July 25, 1967
- Commission date: March 26, 1971
- Decommission date: January 31, 2014
- Owner: TEPCO
- Operator: Tokyo Electric Power Company

Nuclear power station
- Reactor type: BWR
- Reactor supplier: General Electric; Toshiba; Hitachi

Power generation
- Units cancelled: 2 × 1,380 MW
- Units decommissioned: 1 × 460 MW (unit 1); 4 × 784 MW (units 2, 3, 4 and 5); 1 × 1,100 MW (unit 6)
- Nameplate capacity: 5,306 MW (1979–2011)

External links
- Website: www.tepco.co.jp/en/hd/responsibility/index-e.html
- Commons: Related media on Commons

The Fukushima Daiichi Nuclear Power Plant (福島第一原子力発電所, Fukushima Daiichi Genshiryoku Hatsudensho; Fukushima number 1 nuclear power plant) is a disabled nuclear power plant located on a 350-hectare (860-acre) site in the towns of Ōkuma and Futaba in Fukushima Prefecture, Japan. The plant suffered major damage from the magnitude 9.1 earthquake and tsunami that hit Japan on March 11, 2011. The chain of events caused meltdowns, radiation leaks and severely damaged several of its reactors, making them impossible to restart. The working reactors were not restarted after the events.

First commissioned in 1971, the plant consists of six boiling water reactors. These light water reactors drove electrical generators with a combined power of 4.7 GWe, making Fukushima Daiichi one of the 15 largest nuclear power stations in the world. Fukushima was the first nuclear plant to be designed, constructed, and run in conjunction with General Electric and Tokyo Electric Power Company (TEPCO). The sister nuclear plant Fukushima Daini ("number two"), 12 kilometres (7.5 mi) to the south, is also run by TEPCO. It also suffered serious damage during the tsunami, at the seawater intakes of all four units, but was successfully shut down and brought to a safe state. See the timeline of the Fukushima II nuclear accidents.

The March 2011 disaster disabled the reactor cooling systems, leading to three reactors melting down causing hydrogen explosions destroying the containment, subsequently releasing large amounts of radioactivity and triggering a 30-kilometre (19 mi) evacuation zone surrounding the plant; as of February 2025, releases of radioactivity are still ongoing. On April 20, 2011, the Japanese authorities declared the 20-kilometre (12 mi) evacuation zone a no-go area which may only be entered under government supervision. In November 2011, the first journalists were allowed to visit the plant. They described a scene of devastation in which three of the reactor buildings were destroyed; the grounds were covered with mangled trucks, crumpled water tanks and other debris left by the tsunami; and radiation levels so high that visitors were only allowed to stay for a few hours.

In April 2012, units 1–4 were shut down. Units 2–4 were shut down on April 19, while unit 1 was the last of these four units to be shut down on April 20 at midnight. In December 2013 TEPCO decided none of the undamaged units will reopen. Units 5 and 6 were shut down later in January 2014.

In April 2021, the Japanese government approved the discharge of radioactive water, which has been treated to remove radionuclides other than tritium, into the Pacific Ocean over the course of 30 years.

== Power plant information ==
Cross-section sketch of a typical BWR Mark I containment, as used in units 1 to 5. The reactor core (1) consists of fuel rods and control rods (39) which are moved in and out by the device (31). Around the pressure vessel (8), there is an outer containment (19) which is closed by a concrete plug (2). When fuel rods are moved in or out, the crane (26) will move this plug to the pool for facilities (3). Steam from the dry well (11) can move to the wet well (24) through jet nozzles (14) to condense there (18). In the spent fuel pool (5), the used fuel rods (27) are stored.

The reactors for units 1, 2, and 6 were supplied by General Electric, those for units 3 and 5 by Toshiba, and unit 4 by Hitachi. All six reactors were designed by General Electric. Architectural design for General Electric's units was done by Ebasco Services. All construction was done by Kajima. Beginning September 2010, unit 3 was fueled by a small fraction (6%) of plutonium containing mixed-oxide (MOX) fuel, rather than the low enriched uranium (LEU) used in the other reactors. Units 1–5 were built with Mark I type (light bulb torus) containment structures. The Mark I containment structure was slightly increased in volume by Japanese engineers. Unit 6 has a Mark II type (over/under) containment structure.

Unit 1 is a 460 MWe boiling water reactor (BWR-3) constructed in July 1967. It commenced commercial electrical production on March 26, 1971, and was initially scheduled for shutdown in early 2011. In February 2011, Japanese regulators granted an extension of ten years for the continued operation of the reactor. It was damaged during the 2011 Tōhoku earthquake and tsunami.

Unit 1 was designed for a peak ground acceleration of 0.18 g (1.74 m/s^{2}) and a response spectrum based on the 1952 Kern County earthquake, but rated for 0.498 g. The design basis for Units 3 and 6 were 0.45 g (4.41 m/s^{2}) and 0.46 g (4.48 m/s^{2}) respectively. All units were inspected after the 1978 Miyagi earthquake when the ground acceleration was 0.125 g (1.22 m/s^{2}) for 30 seconds, but no damage to the critical parts of the reactor was discovered. The design basis for tsunamis was 5.7 metres (18 ft 8 in).

The reactor's emergency diesel generators and DC batteries, crucial components in helping keep the reactors cool in the event of a power loss, were located in the basements of the reactor turbine buildings. The reactor design plans provided by General Electric specified placing the generators and batteries in that location, but mid-level engineers working on the construction of the plant were concerned that this made the backup power systems vulnerable to flooding. TEPCO elected to strictly follow General Electric's design in the construction of the reactors.

=== Site layout ===
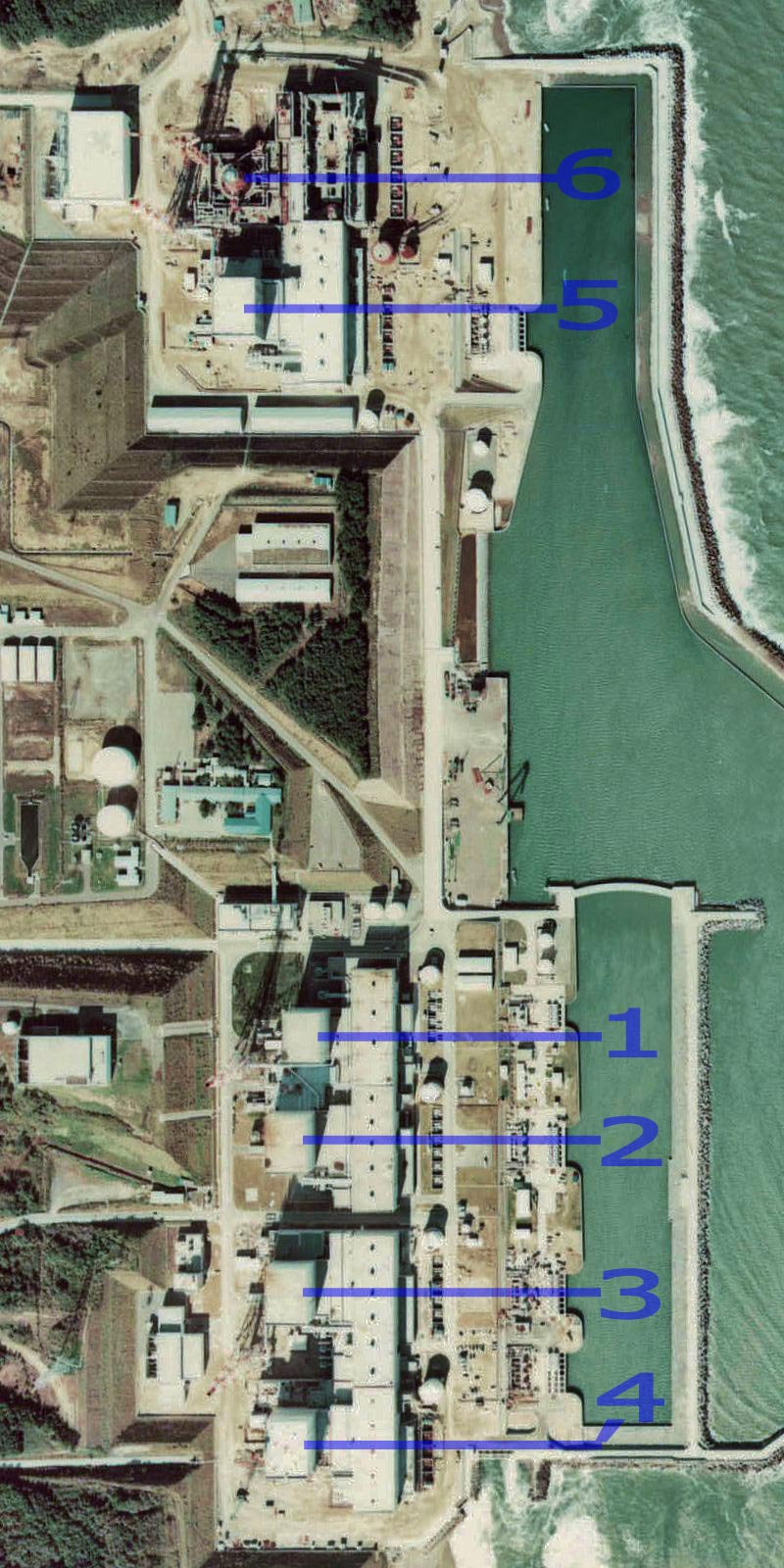
Aerial view of the plant area in 1975, showing separation between units 5 and 6, and the majority of the complex. Unit 6 is nearer to Sōma, unit 4 is nearer to Iwaki

The plant is on a bluff which was originally 35 metres (115 ft) above sea level. During construction, however, TEPCO lowered the height of the bluff by 25 metres (82 ft). One reason for lowering the bluff was to allow the base of the reactors to be constructed on solid bedrock in order to mitigate the threat posed by earthquakes. Another reason was the lowered height would keep the running costs of the seawater pumps low. TEPCO's analysis of the tsunami risk when planning the site's construction determined that the lower elevation was safe because the sea wall would provide adequate protection for the maximum tsunami assumed by the design basis. However, the lower site elevation did increase the vulnerability for a tsunami larger than anticipated in design.

The Fukushima Daiichi site is divided into two reactor groups, the leftmost group – when viewed from the ocean – contains units 4, 3, 2 and 1 going from left to right. The rightmost group – when likewise viewed from the ocean – contains the newer units 5 and 6, respectively, the positions from left to right. A set of seawalls protrude into the ocean, with the water intake in the middle and water discharge outlets on either side.

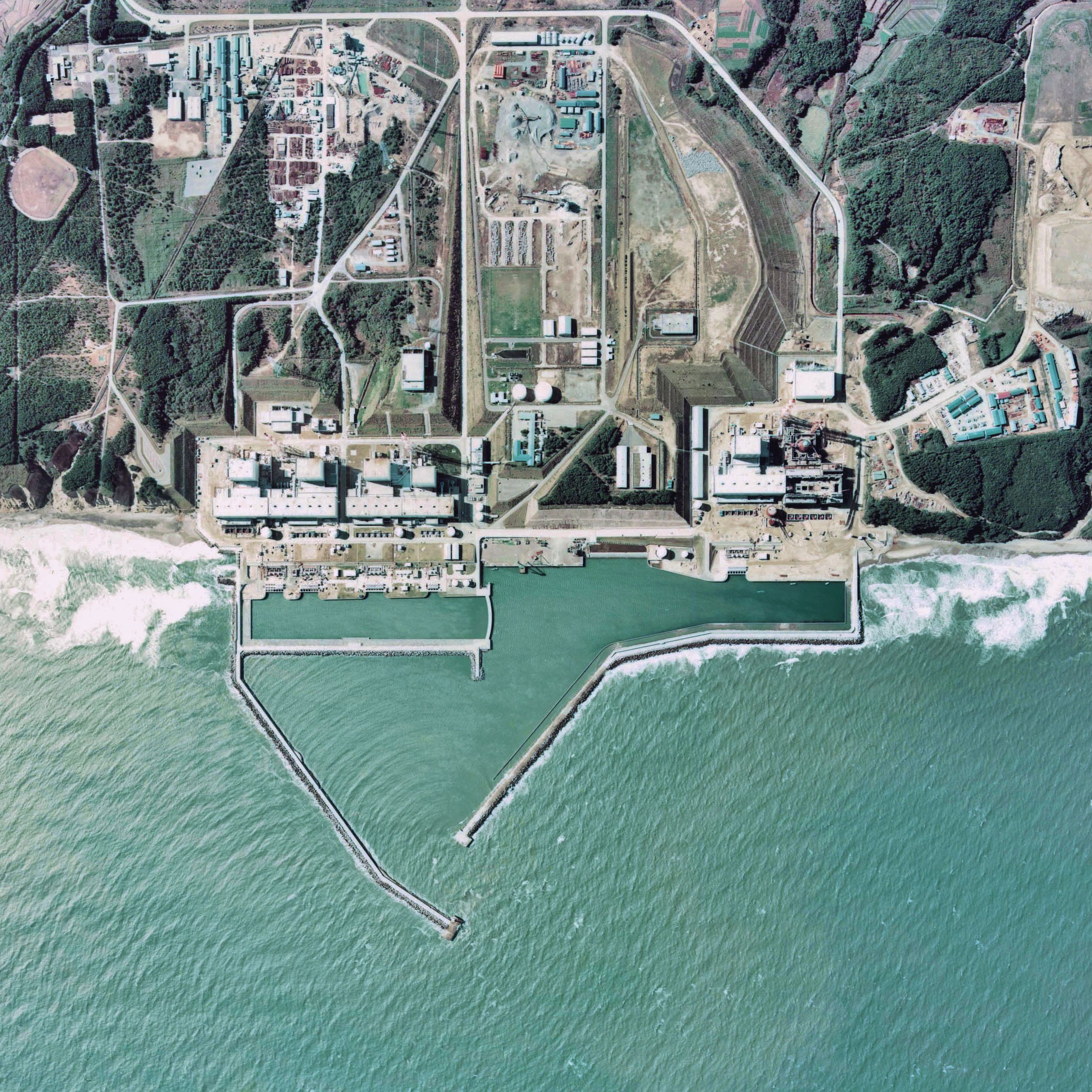
Aerial view of the Fukushima I plant area in 1975, showing sea walls and completed reactors

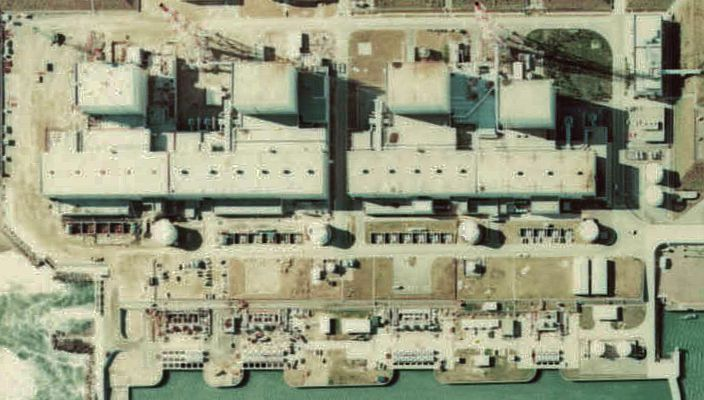
Closeup of Units 4, 3, 2 and 1

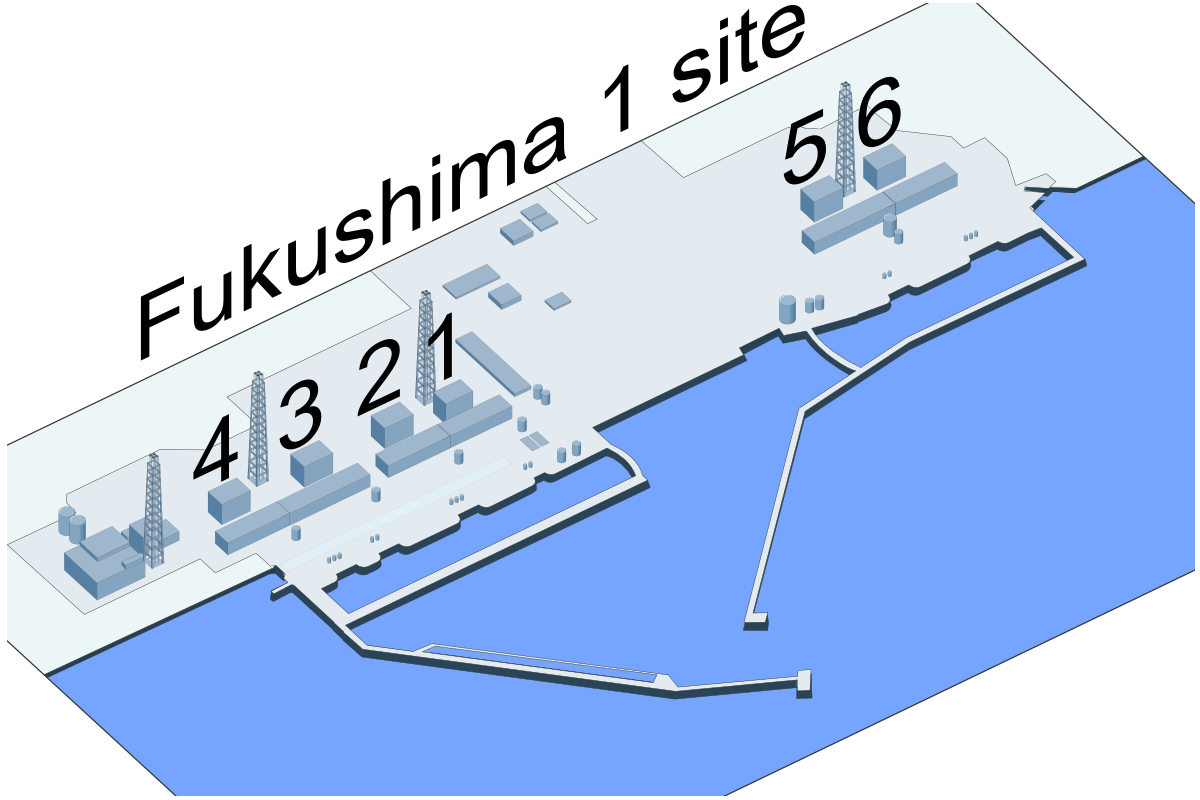
Major buildings

Illustration of post-accident state of 1–4 reactors, all but 2 display obvious damage to secondary containment

=== Reactor data ===
Units 7 and 8 were planned to start construction in April 2012 and 2013 and to come into operation in October 2016 and 2017 respectively. The project was formally canceled by TEPCO in April 2011 after local authorities questioned the fact that they were still included in the supply plan for 2011, released in March 2011, after the accidents. The company stated that the plan had been drafted before the earthquake.

Unit	Type (Containment)	Net power	Start construction	First criticality	Commercial operation	Shutdown	NSSS	A-E	Builder
1	BWR-3 (Mark I)	439 MW	July 25, 1967	October 10, 1970	March 26, 1971	May 19, 2011	General Electric	Ebasco	Kajima
2	BWR-4 (Mark I)	760 MW	June 9, 1969	May 10, 1973	July 18, 1974	May 19, 2011	General Electric	Ebasco	Kajima
3	BWR-4 (Mark I)	760 MW	December 28, 1970	September 6, 1974	March 27, 1976	May 19, 2011	Toshiba	Toshiba	Kajima
4	BWR-4 (Mark I)	760 MW	February 12, 1973	January 28, 1978	October 12, 1978	May 19, 2011	Hitachi	Hitachi	Kajima
5	BWR-4 (Mark I)	760 MW	May 22, 1972	August 26, 1977	April 18, 1978	December 17, 2013	Toshiba	Toshiba	Kajima
6	BWR-5 (Mark II)	1067 MW	October 26, 1973	March 9, 1979	October 24, 1979	December 17, 2013	General Electric	Ebasco	Kajima
7 (planned)	ABWR	1380 MW	Canceled 04/2011	Planned 10/2016					
8 (planned)	ABWR	1380 MW	Canceled 04/2011	Planned 10/2017					

=== Electrical connections ===
The Fukushima Daiichi plant is connected to the power grid by four lines, the 500 kV Futaba Line (双葉線), the two 275 kV Ōkuma Lines (大熊線) and the 66 kV Yonomori Line (夜の森線) to the Shin-Fukushima (New Fukushima) substation.

The Shin-Fukushima substation also connects to the Fukushima Daini plant by the Tomioka Line (富岡線). Its major connection to the north is the Iwaki Line (いわき幹線), which is owned by Tohoku Electric Power. It has two connections to the south-west that connect it to the Shin-Iwaki substation (新いわき).

=== Operating history ===
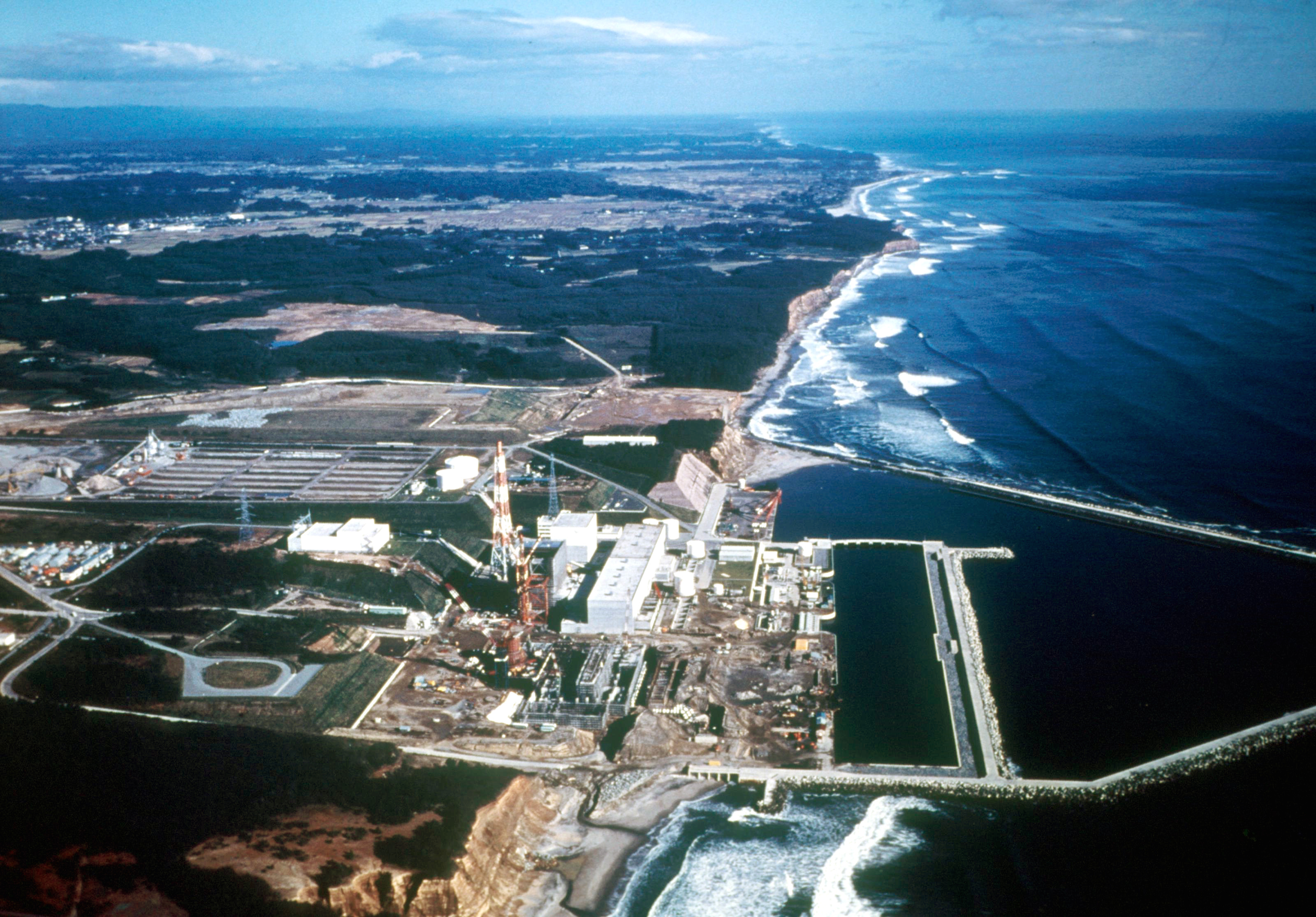
Plant still under construction, c. 1971

The plant reactors came online one at a time beginning in 1970 and the last in 1979. From the end of 2002 through 2005, the reactors were among those shut down for a time for safety checks due to the TEPCO data falsification scandal. On February 28, 2011, TEPCO submitted a report to the Japanese Nuclear and Industrial Safety Agency admitting that the company had previously submitted fake inspection and repair reports. The report revealed that TEPCO failed to inspect more than 30 technical components of the six reactors, including power boards for the reactor's temperature control valves, as well as components of cooling systems such as water pump motors and emergency power diesel generators. In 2008, the IAEA warned Japan that the Fukushima plant was built using outdated safety guidelines, and could be a "serious problem" during a large earthquake. The warning led to the building of an emergency response center in 2010, used during the response to the 2011 nuclear accident.

On April 5, 2011, TEPCO vice-president Takashi Fujimoto announced that the company was canceling plans to build units 7 and 8. On May 20 TEPCO's board of directors' officially voted to decommission units 1 through 4 of the Fukushima Daiichi nuclear power plant and to cancel plans to build units 7 and 8. It refused however to make a decision regarding units 5 and 6 of the station or units 1 to 4 of the Fukushima Daini nuclear power station until a detailed investigation is made. In December 2013 TEPCO decided to decommission the undamaged units 5 and 6; they may be used to test remote cleanup methods before use on the damaged reactors.

Electricity generation for the Fukushima I NPP by Unit in GW·h

Electricity generation for the Fukushima I

Year	Unit 1	Unit 2	Unit 3	Unit 4	Unit 5	Unit 6
1970	60.482					
1971	2024.3					
1972	2589.1					
1973	2216.8	5.949				
1974	1629.7	3670.1	284.7			
1975	0	622.1	2961.8			
1976	1563.9	4191.4	4807.1			
1977	0	49.7	2171.1		875.1	
1978	1497.6	3876.3	2753.7	3163.2	4806.7	
1979	2504.4	2976	4916.3	3917.4	3898.6	3235.6
1980	1249.5	2889	4287	4317	4282.6	6441.1
1981	1084.8	3841.8	3722.8	4667.5	4553.9	7418.6
1982	2355	5290.2	2886.8	5734.7	4061.3	6666.5
1983	3019.5	3422.7	4034	4818.2	5338.8	5387.8
1984	2669.761	3698.718	4497.326	4433.166	4691.482	5933.242
1985	1699.287	4266.285	5798.641	4409.031	4112.429	5384.802
1986	2524.683	5541.101	4234.196	4315.241	4157.361	7783.537
1987	3308.888	3851.078	3748.839	5964.048	3995.012	7789.201
1988	2794.464	4101.251	5122.991	5309.892	5952.712	5593.058
1989	1440.778	6516.393	5706.694	4232.648	4766.535	5128.362
1990	2352.405	3122.761	2919.548	4273.767	3956.549	7727.073
1991	1279.986	3853.054	4491.022	6483.384	6575.818	6948.662
1992	1794.061	4568.531	6098.742	4082.747	4841.234	5213.607
1993	2500.668	4186.704	4204.301	4206.577	4059.685	6530.932
1994	3337.532	2265.961	4202.304	6323.277	4246.206	8079.391
1995	3030.829	6396.469	5966.533	5485.662	5878.681	6850.839
1996	2298.589	5192.318	4909.655	4949.891	5666.866	6157.765
1997	3258.913	4618.869	2516.651	4556.81	4609.382	9307.735
1998	3287.231	3976.16	2632.682	5441.398	5369.912	6328.985
1999	2556.93	3158.382	5116.09	5890.548	6154.135	7960.491
2000	3706.281	5167.247	5932.485	4415.901	1647.027	7495.577
2001	487.504	5996.521	5637.317	5858.452	5905.13	7778.874
2002	3120.2	5101.018	3567.314	4687.718	6590.488	6270.918
2003	0	1601.108	2483.557	0	2723.76	4623.905
2004	0	3671.49	3969.674	4728.987	5471.325	1088.787
2005	851.328	3424.939	5103.85	1515.596	2792.561	7986.451
2006	3714.606	3219.494	4081.932	4811.409	4656.9	5321.767
2007	610.761	5879.862	4312.845	5050.607	5389.565	6833.522
2008	3036.562	5289.599	6668.839	4410.285	3930.677	8424.526
2009	2637.414	4903.293	4037.601	5462.108	5720.079	7130.99
2010	2089.015			6040.782		

== Warnings and design critique ==
In 1990, the U.S. Nuclear Regulatory Commission (NRC) ranked the failure of the emergency electricity generators and subsequent failure of the cooling systems of plants in seismically very active regions one of the most likely risks. The Japanese Nuclear and Industrial Safety Agency (NISA) cited this report in 2004. According to Jun Tateno, a former NISA scientist, TEPCO did not react to these warnings and did not respond with any measures.

Filmmaker Adam Curtis mentioned the risks of the type of boiling water reactors cooling systems such as those in Fukushima I, and claimed the risks were known since 1971 in a series of documentaries from the BBC in 1992 and advised that PWR type reactors should have been used.

Tokyo Electric Power Company (TEPCO) operated the station and was warned their seawall was insufficient to withstand a powerful tsunami, but did not increase the seawall height in response. The Onagawa Nuclear Power Plant, operated by Tohoku Electric Power, ran closer to the epicenter of the earthquake, but had much more robust seawalls of greater height and avoided a severe accident.

== Incidents and accidents prior to March 2011 ==
=== 1978 ===
Control rods fell off in reactor unit 3, causing a nuclear reaction. It took about seven and a half hours to place the rods back into proper positions. There was no record of the incident, as TEPCO had covered it up; interviews of two former workers in 2007 led to its discovery by TEPCO management.

=== February 25, 2009 ===
A manual shutdown was initiated during the middle of a start-up operation. The cause was a high pressure alarm that was triggered by the shutting of a turbine bypass valve. The reactor was at 12% of full power when the alarm occurred at 4:03 am (local time) due to a pressure increase to 7,100 kPa (1,030 psi), exceeding the regulatory limit of 6,910 kPa (1,002 psi). The reactor was reduced to 0% power, which exceeded the 5% threshold that requires event reporting, and pressure dropped back under the regulatory limit at 4:25 am. Later, at 8:49 am the control blades were completely inserted, constituting a manual reactor shutdown. An inspection then confirmed that one of the 8 bypass valves had closed and that the valve had a bad driving fluid connection. The reactor had been starting up following its 25th regular inspection, which had begun on October 18, 2008.

=== March 26, 2009 ===
Unit 3 had problems with over-insertion of control blades during outage. Repair work was being done on equipment that regulates the driving pressure for the control blades, and when a valve was opened at 2:23 pm a control blade drift alarm went off. On later inspection, it was found that several of the rods had been unintentionally inserted.

=== November 2, 2010 ===
Unit 5 had an automatic SCRAM while an operator was conducting an adjustment to the control blade insertion pattern. The SCRAM was caused by a reactor low water level alarm. The turbine tripped along with the reactor and there was no radiation injury to workers.

== Nuclear accident of March 11, 2011 ==
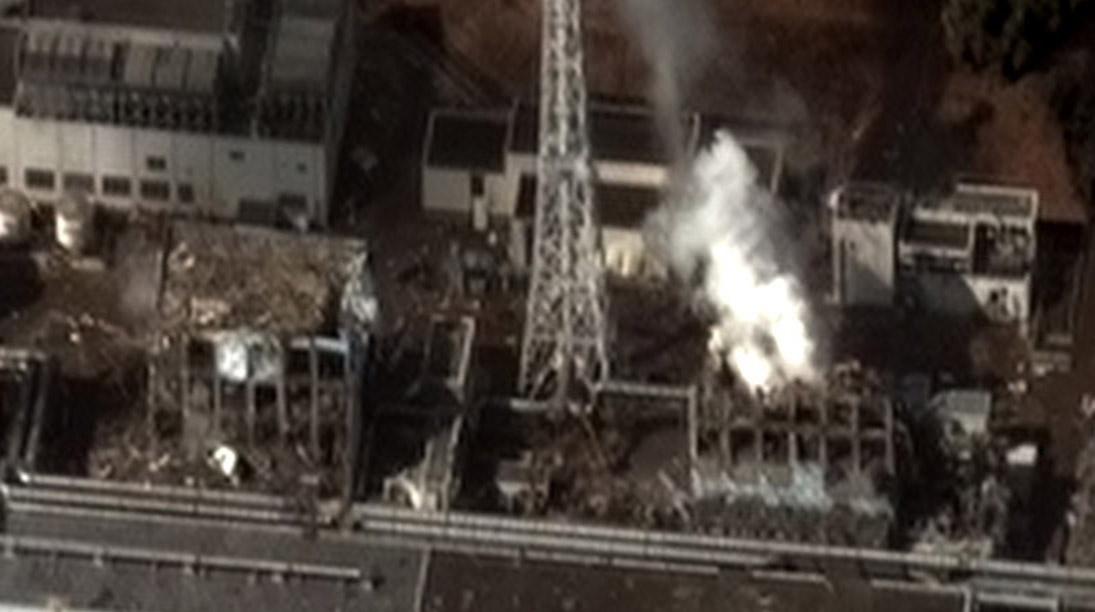
Three of the reactors at Fukushima Daiichi overheated, causing meltdowns that eventually led to explosions, which released large amounts of radioactive material into the air.

On March 11, 2011, an earthquake categorized as 9.1 M_{W} on the moment magnitude scale occurred at 2:46 pm Japan Standard Time (JST) off the northeast coast of Japan, one of the most powerful earthquakes in history. Units 4, 5 and 6 had been shut down prior to the earthquake for planned maintenance. The remaining reactors were shut down/SCRAMed automatically after the earthquake, and the remaining decay heat of the fuel was being cooled with power from emergency generators. The subsequent destructive tsunami with waves of up to 14 metres (46 ft) that over-topped the station, which had seawalls, disabled emergency generators required to cool the reactors and spent fuel pools in units 1–5. Over the following three weeks there was evidence of partial nuclear meltdowns in units 1, 2 and 3: visible explosions, suspected to be caused by hydrogen gas, in units 1 and 3; a suspected explosion in unit 2, that may have damaged the primary containment vessel; and a possible uncovering of the spent fuel pools in units 1, 3 and 4. Units 5 and 6 were reported on March 19, by the station-wide alert log updates of the IAEA, to have gradually rising spent fuel pool temperatures as they had likewise lost offsite power, though had onsite power provided by unit 6's two diesel generators which hadn't been flooded and were reconfigured to do double-duty cooling both unit 5 and 6's spent fuel pools and cores. As a precautionary measure, vents in the roofs of these two units were also made to prevent the possibility of hydrogen gas pressurization and then ignition.

Radiation releases from units 1–4 forced the evacuation of 83,000 residents from towns around the plant. The triple meltdown also caused concerns about contamination of food and water supplies, including the 2011 rice harvest, and also the health effects of radiation on workers at the plant. Scientists estimate that the accident released 18 quadrillion becquerels of caesium-137 into the Pacific Ocean, contaminating 390 square kilometres (150 sq mi) of the ocean floor.

The events at units 1, 2 and 3 have been rated at level 5 each on the International Nuclear Event Scale, and those at unit 4 as level 3 (Serious Incident) events, with the overall plant rating at level 7 (major release of radioactive material with widespread health and environmental effects requiring implementation of planned and extended countermeasures), making the Fukushima disaster and the Chernobyl disaster worldwide the only level 7 events to date as of 2024.

Japanese wheelchair basketball player Akira Toyoshima revealed that he was working as an accountant at the Fukushima Daiichi Nuclear Power Plant at the time of the earthquake, tsunami, and nuclear disaster. Toyoshima was focused on organizing a set of important and urgent documents in the main office building of the Fukushima Daiichi Nuclear Power Plant as a member of the accounting team when it happened.

=== Aftermath ===
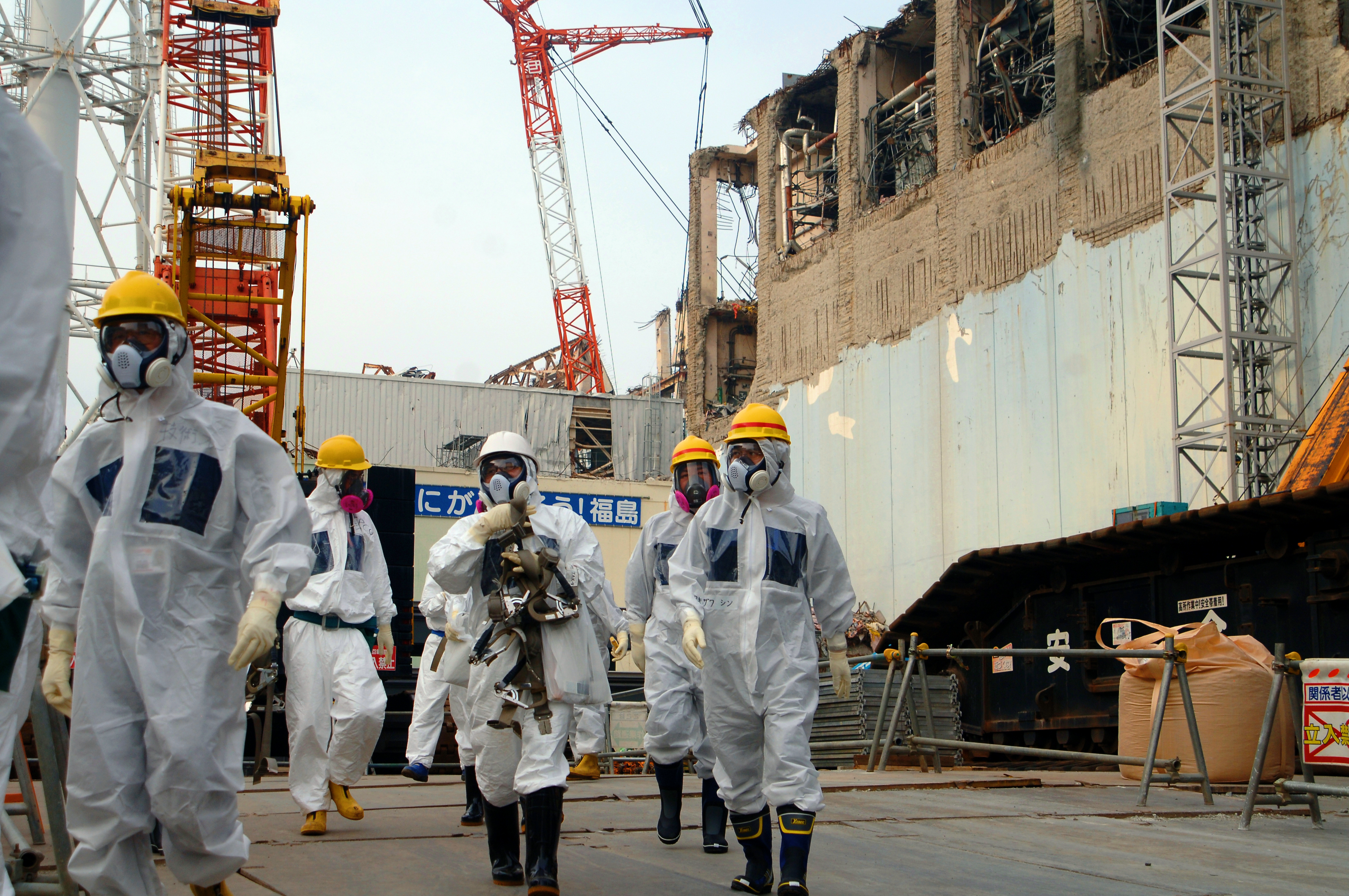
IAEA Experts at Fukushima Daiichi Nuclear Power Plant unit 4 in 2013

In April 2013, TEPCO publicly admitted radionuclide contaminated water may have leaked from the storage units, possibly contaminating the soil and water nearby. The leak was controlled and stored in containment tanks. Contaminated water continued to accumulate at the plant, and TEPCO announced plans to filter radioactive particles and discharge purified water.

In August, Japanese officials said highly radioactive water was leaking from Fukushima Daiichi into the Pacific Ocean at a rate of 270 tonnes (600 thousand pounds) per day. Japanese Prime Minister Shinzo Abe ordered government officials to step in.

By September 2019, 907 thousand tonnes (2 billion pounds) of contaminated cooling water had been collected in tall steel tanks. Large filtration systems were used to clean the water of its radioactive contaminants, but could not remove the estimated 14 grams (0.49 oz) of tritium, a radioactive isotope of hydrogen (Hydrogen-3) bonded into water molecules. TEPCO estimated the immediate site would run out of space by 2022, and planned to solve this problem by disposing of the radioactive water into the Pacific Ocean. This proposed measure was criticized by environmental groups and several Asian governments, who claimed that storage area was available in the exclusion zone around the reactor. Japan's government approved the disposing into the Pacific Ocean, beginning in 2023, over the course of an estimated 40 years.

A note in the 2020 Tokyo Olympic Games opening speech referenced the disaster and how Japan has recovered from the disaster.

== Dismantling of reactors ==
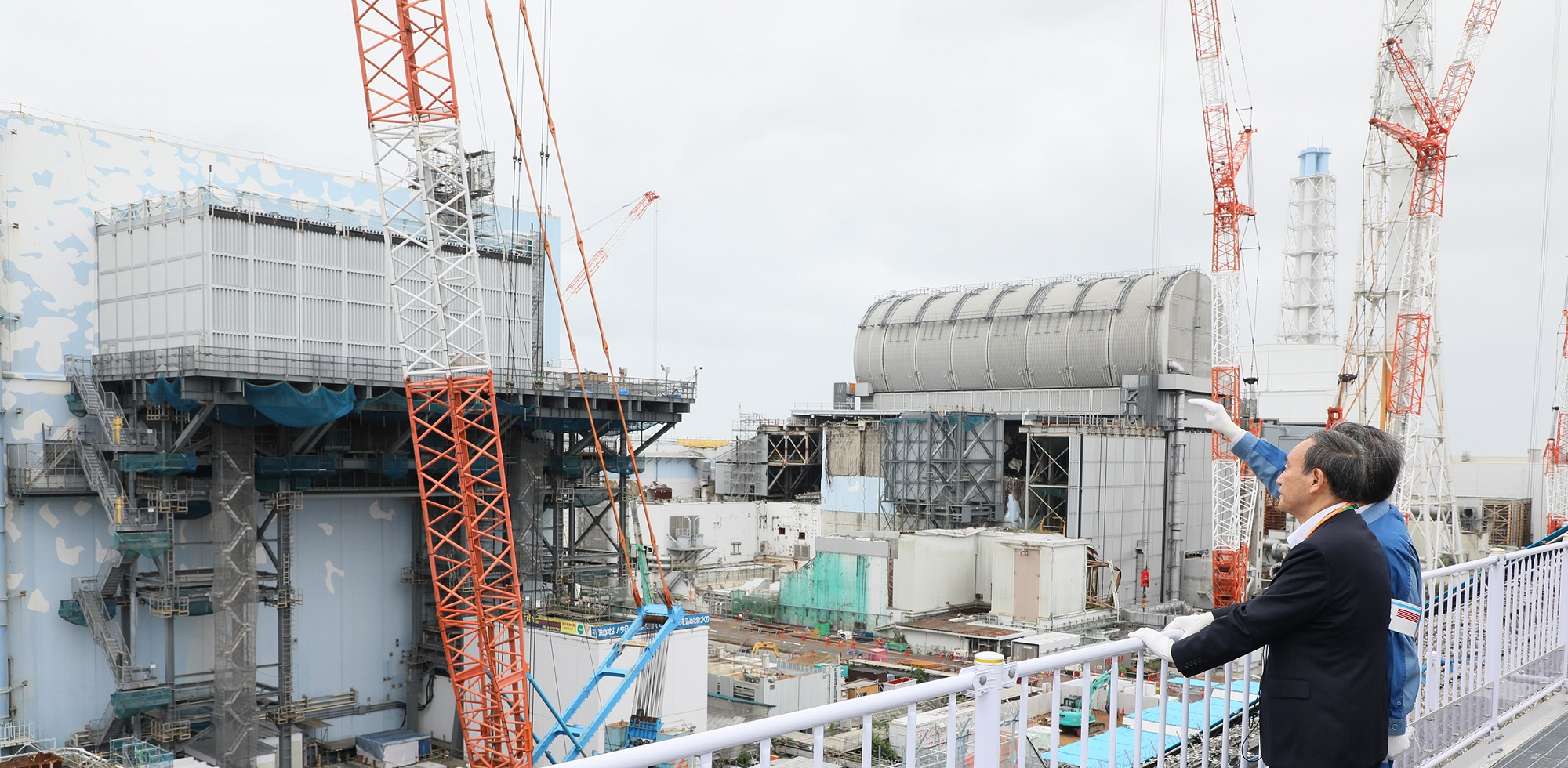
Prime Minister Yoshihide Suga inspected the Daiichi Nuclear Power Plant on September 26, 2020.

The reactors will take 30–40 years to be decommissioned. On August 1, 2013, the Japanese Industry Minister Toshimitsu Motegi approved the creation of a structure to develop the technologies and processes necessary to dismantle the four reactors damaged in the Fukushima accident.

To reduce the flow of contaminated water into the Pacific Ocean, TEPCO spent ¥34.5 billion (approximately US$324 million) to build a 1.5-kilometre-long (0.93 mi) underground wall of frozen soil around the plant, constructed by Kajima Corporation. 1,500 thirty-metre-long (ninety-eight-foot), supercooled pipes were inserted into the ground in order to freeze the surrounding groundwater and soil. The wall ultimately failed to significantly decrease the groundwater flowing into the site.

The cost of decommissioning and decontamination of the Fukushima Daiichi nuclear power plant has been estimated at $195 billion, which includes compensation payouts to victims of the disaster. The amount also includes decommissioning of Fukushima Daiichi reactors, which is estimated at $71 billion. TEPCO will shoulder $143 billion of decommissioning and decontamination, while the Ministry of Finance of Japan will provide $17 billion. Other power companies will also contribute to the cost.

On September 26, 2020, Prime Minister Yoshihide Suga visited the Daiichi Nuclear Power Plant to show that his cabinet prioritized the reconstruction of areas that were affected by natural and nuclear disasters.

The three reactors host 880 tonnes (1.9 million pounds) of highly radioactive melted nuclear fuel. As of 2024, 13 years after the accident, attempts to remove highly radioactive material from the damaged reactor were halted. A robot, dubbed Telesco attempted to remove 3 grams (0.11 oz) of the estimated 880 tonnes (1.9 million pounds) lethally radioactive molten fuel. This sample would provide critical data for the development of future decommissioning methods, as well as the necessary technology and robots, according to experts. On September 11, 2024, a robotic mission at Fukushima Daiichi restarted to collect a small sample of melted radioactive fuel from a damaged reactor. The sample will help improve future decommissioning strategies, though doubts persist about the long-term cleanup timeline. A glitch halted Telesco, the robot attempting to retrieve the sample, further delaying the mission. Concerns also remain over the impact on marine life as radioactive water is being released into the Pacific Ocean, despite government assurances that it meets safety standards.

In November 2024, TEPCO moved a small piece of melted fuel from Fukushima's reactor for radiation testing, a key step in its complex decommissioning process.

== See also ==
- GE Three
- List of boiling water reactors
- List of earthquakes in Japan
- List of nuclear power plants in Japan
- Nuclear power in Japan

2011 earthquake and tsunami accident

- Fukushima nuclear accident
- International reactions to the Fukushima nuclear accident
- Japanese reaction to the Fukushima nuclear accident
- Radiation effects from the Fukushima nuclear accident
