= Ichiban =

Ichiban is Japanese for number one and may refer to:

- "Ichiban", a song in the A–Z Series by Ash
- Ichi-Ban, an album by the Louis Hayes – Junior Cook Quintet
- Ichiban Records, an Atlanta, Georgia hip-hop record label
- Chūka Ichiban!, a Japanese anime
- Sapporo Ichiban, a brand of instant noodles produced by Sanyo Foods
