= Goshogawara Tachineputa Festival =

Summer festival in Goshogawara, Japan

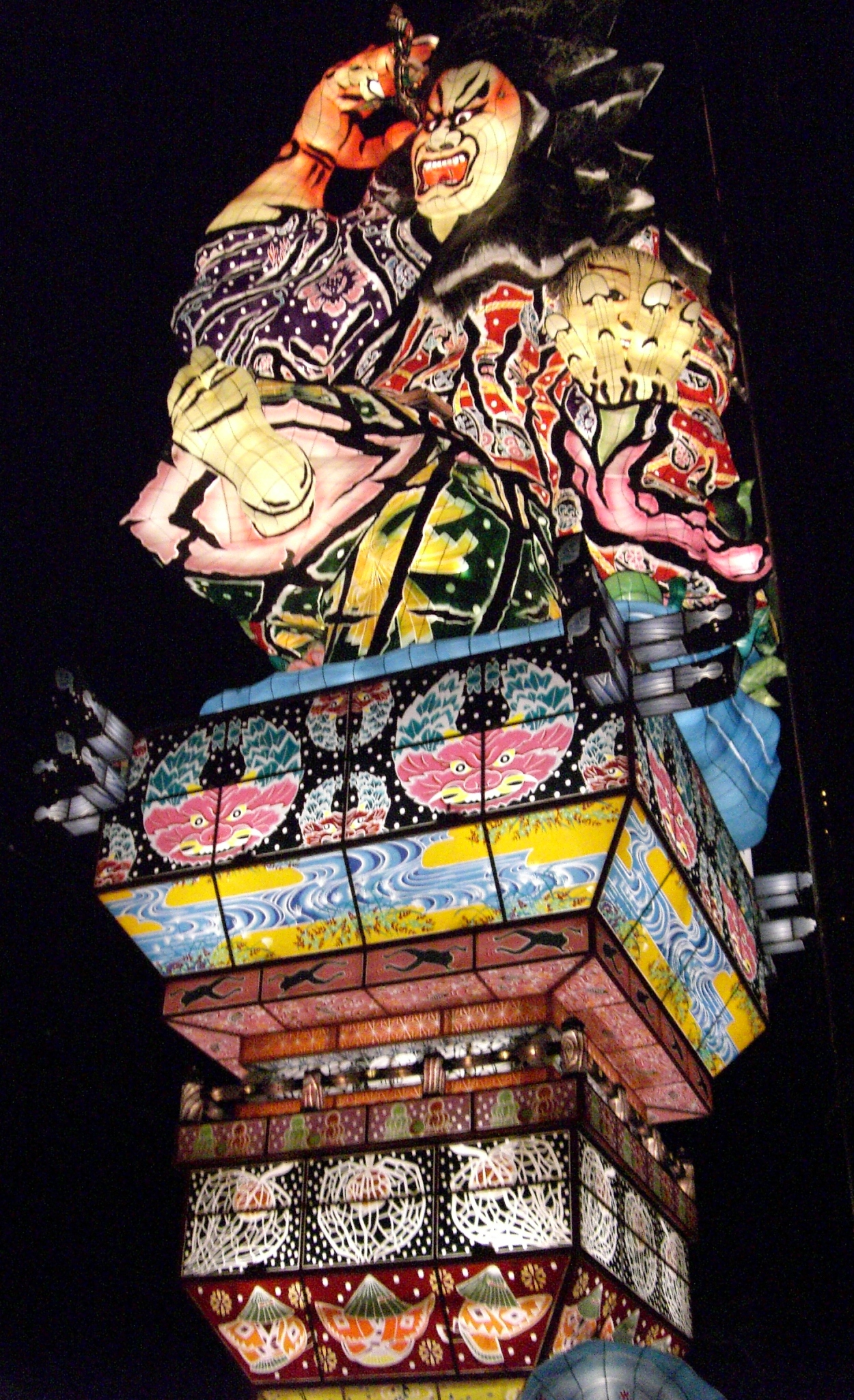
Tachineputa float

The Goshogawara Tachineputa Festival (五所川原立佞武多祭り, Goshogawara Tachineputa Matsuri) is a Japanese summer festival which takes place every August in Goshogawara, Aomori Prefecture, Japan. It is known as one of the four largest festivals in the Tsugaru region of Japan, along with the Aomori Nebuta Festival, the Hirosaki Neputa Festival, and the Kuroishi Yosare Festival. The Goshogawara Tachineputa Festival is notable for its large tachineputa floats, which are much taller than those found in the Aomori and Hirosaki Festivals. The tachineputa floats stand at 23 meters in height and weigh 19 tons. The start of the festival is marked with a fireworks show on August 3, with the parade beginning on August 4 and continuing through August 8th.

The 2020 festival was cancelled due to the COVID-19 pandemic.

== See also ==
- List of festivals in Aomori Prefecture
- Tachineputa Museum
