= Lungmen Nuclear Power Plant =

Nuclear power plant in Gungliao, New Taipei, Taiwan

Lungmen Nuclear Power Plant; 龍門核能發電廠
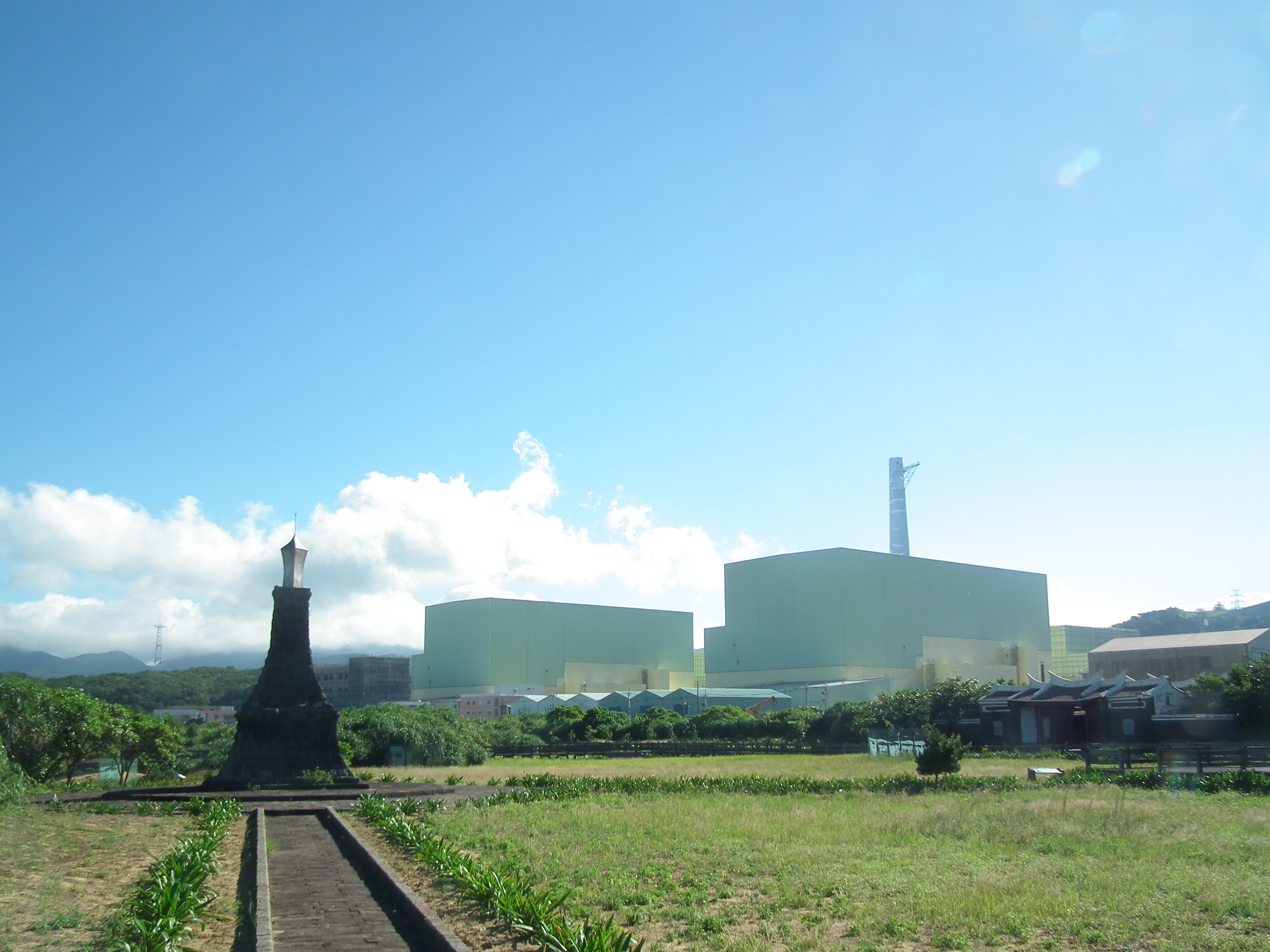
- Country: Taiwan
- Location: Gongliao District
- Coordinates: 25°02′19″N 121°55′27″E
- Status: Mothballed
- Construction began: 1999
- Commission date: N/A (Unit 1); N/A (Unit 2)
- Construction cost: NT$280 billion; (US$9.4 billion)
- Owner: Taipower
- Operator: Taipower

Nuclear power station
- Reactor type: ABWR
- Reactor supplier: General Electric

Power generation
- Units under const.: 2 x 1,350 MW
- Nameplate capacity: 2,700 MW

External links
- Commons: Related media on Commons

The Lungmen Nuclear Power Plant (Chinese: 龍門核能發電廠; pinyin: Lóngmén Hénéng Fādiànchǎng), formerly known as Gongliao and commonly as the Fourth Nuclear Power Plant (Chinese: 核四; pinyin: Hésì; lit. 'Nuke 4'), is an unfinished nuclear power plant in New Taipei City, Taiwan. It consists of two ABWRs each of 1,300 MWe net. It is owned by Taiwan Power Company (Taipower).

It was intended to be the first of these advanced Generation III reactors built outside Japan. The preceding four reactors in Japan were completed in four to five years. However, Taipower did not award the contract to a single architect/engineering firm; instead, they split the procurement among multiple vendors, complicating project management and increasing costs. In 2000, the project was canceled due to political opposition when it was approximately 10–30% complete but restarted in February 2001.

A national referendum was proposed in 2014 to decide if construction of the plant should continue, but the referendum was rejected from the ballot for contradictory and confusing language. Taipower submitted a plan to mothball Unit 1, which was by then complete, and freeze construction of Unit 2, starting in 2015. In 2018, Taipower started removing unused fuel from Unit 1 and returned the fuel to the United States. In December 2021, the proposal to continue construction of Unit 2 was narrowly rejected in a referendum. Given that Tsai Ing Wen of the ruling DPP opposes nuclear power and wishes to complete a nuclear phaseout by 2025 (one year after the 2024 Taiwanese presidential election), it is unlikely that construction will ever restart even though it is technologically feasible in principle and not without precedent to finish construction of a nuclear power plant after decades of no construction activity on a legacy construction project.

== History ==
The Fourth Nuclear Power Plant was first proposed in 1978, and Taipower selected the ABWR in 1996 after a competitive bidding process. The reactor is designed by General Electric, but is supported by Hitachi, Shimizu Corporation, Toshiba, and other American, Taiwanese, and other Chinese and international companies.

The application to start construction was submitted on October 16, 1997, and after the license was granted on March 17, 1999, construction of the plant began in 1999 and was expected to be completed in 2004. The preceding four ABWR units in Japan were completed in four to five years each. Taipower, however, did not award the contract to a single architect/engineer, but hired General Electric to build the reactors, Mitsubishi Heavy Industries to supply the turbines and the generators, and other contractors for the rest, making the project difficult to manage. Construction has been delayed by legal, regulatory and political obstacles. The delays in schedule also have increased the cost of the project, due to the inflation of the costs of raw materials.

=== Initial cancellation ===
The 921 earthquake in 1999 prompted three legislators to inspect construction progress; they cited rusty rebar and potential seawater seepage into the plant's foundation as potential issues. President Chen Shui-bian was elected along with other Democratic Progressive Party (DPP) legislators in March 2000 on an anti-nuclear platform which included stopping plant construction. DPP legislators called for a halt to the project in April 2000, which led to the suspension of construction in October 2000 by Premier Chang Chun-hsiung when it was approximately 10–30% complete, only to restart the following year. Contractors were idled for 111 days (from 27 October 2000 to 14 February 2001), which caused a 576-day delay towards commercial operation.

Taipower constructed a wharf in 2003 to accommodate delivery of heavy components, such as the reactor vessel. The wharf was beset with construction delays and may have contributed to local beach erosion, prompting further protests. Each reactor vessel delivery was greeted with activist protests and construction delays resulted in the vessels being stored longer than expected, with Unit 1's reactor vessel not installed until 2005.

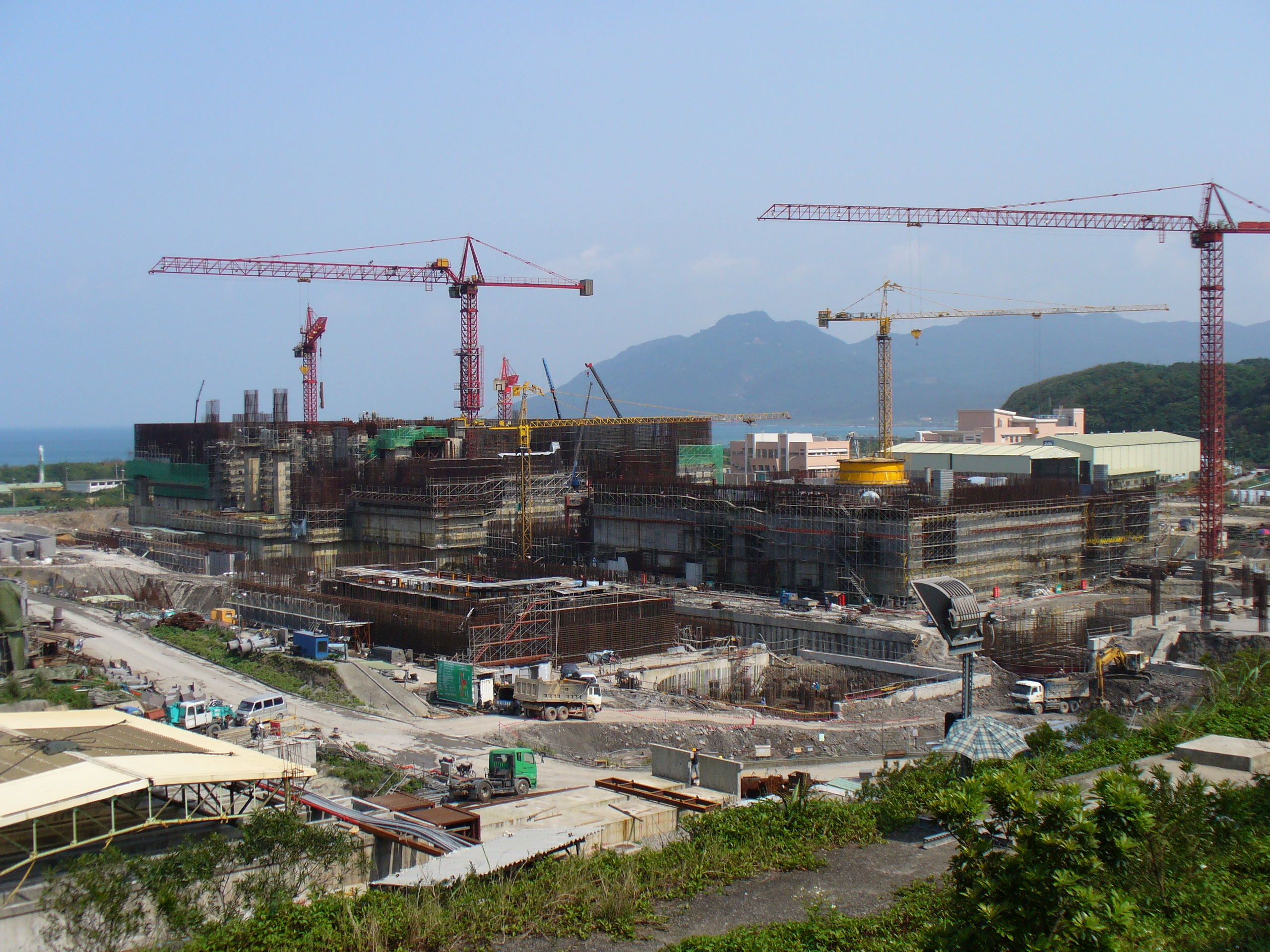
Construction of Lungmen Nuclear Power Plant

Design of the plant was carried out by Stone & Webster (S&W), but Taipower canceled its contract with S&W in 2007, leading to protracted litigation from 2007 to 2011. In 2010, aboriginal artifacts were found at the construction site, prompting calls to halt construction again.

In 2011 the Taiwan Atomic Energy Council (AEC) criticized Taipower's management of the project. Taipower was fined by the AEC twice, in 2008 and 2011, for completing design changes without first obtaining approval from the plant's designer, General Electric. Taipower later stated the changes were executed to stay on schedule, and approval was later obtained from GE for 97% of the changes.

The temporary cancellation by the Government and other project management difficulties caused significant delays, pushing the price tag of the plant to more than US$7.5 billion by 2009. As of 2014, the total price tag was close to US$10 billion, or NT$300 billion.

=== 2012 referendum attempts ===
Environmental groups called for a national referendum in April 2011, following the Fukushima Daiichi nuclear disaster. By obtaining the signatures of a certain percentage of registered voters, or by legislative action, a referendum may be referred to the national ballot for voter action. However, due to the politically sensitive nature of the Fourth Nuclear Plant issue, legislatively-referred and voter-referred referendums had failed to enter the national ballot.

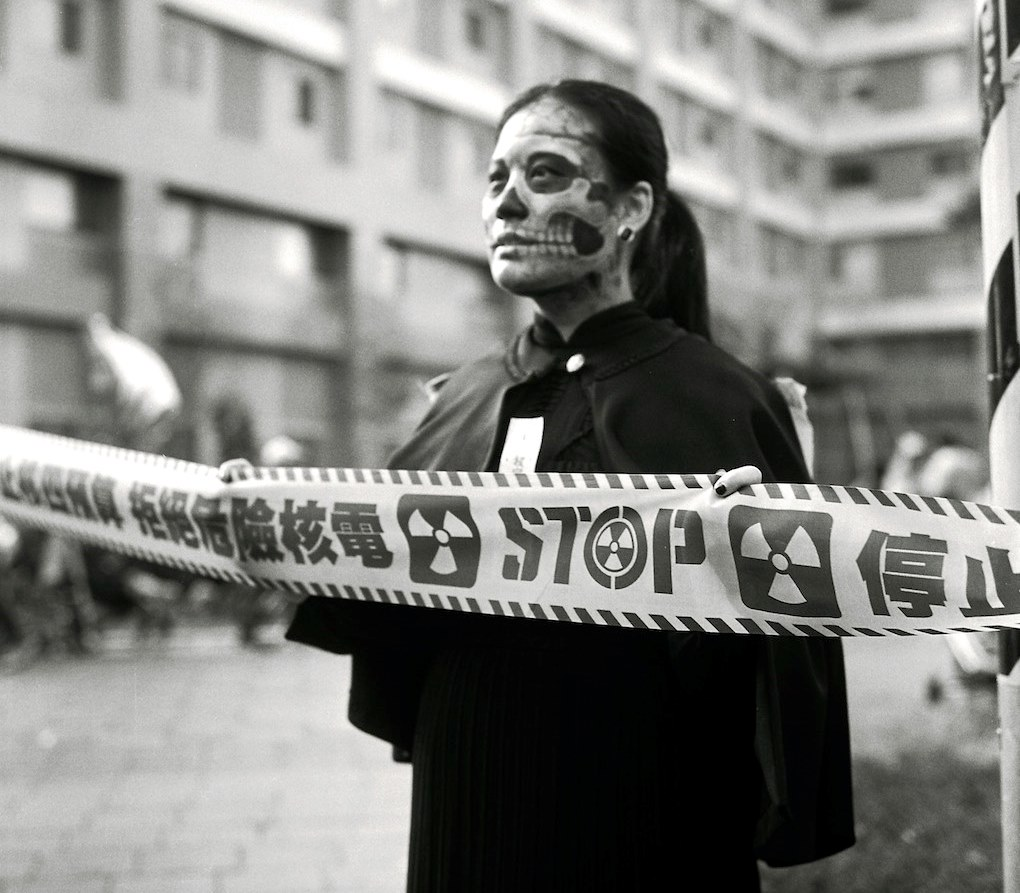
Demonstrations were held to halt construction in March 2013

Because of the controversy over the plant, in February 2013 the Kuomintang (KMT)-led government proposed that a referendum should be issued, which would allow the people of the country to decide the fate of the plant. The proposed referendum was sponsored by 32 KMT lawmakers led by Lee Ching-hua and asked "Do you agree that the construction of the Fourth Nuclear Power Plant should be halted and that it not become operational?" Referendums must have good voter turnout (greater than 50% of registered voters must participate in the referendum vote), and a majority of participating voters must vote yes in order for the referendum to become binding, meaning that poor voter turnout would ensure referendum defeat (and in the case of the Lee referendum, continued construction). The opposition DPP claimed that getting better than 50% voter turnout in a non-Presidential election year was too difficult, and barricaded the legislative chamber to prevent a vote to place the Lee referendum on the national ballot. This led to a scuffle when KMT legislators attempted to break through the barricade, and the Lee referendum was not voted on. In the following legislative session, protesters called on the government to withdraw the Lee referendum, and it was subsequently withdrawn.

Annette Lu used the local referendum process to debate the plant's fate as early as 2012. Her petition for a local referendum gathered 50,000 signatures by March 2013, but the proposed referendum was rejected by the Executive Yuan Referendum Review Committee in May 2013, ruling the issue was of national importance, and could not be decided by local referendum. She launched another local referendum in June 2013 in opposition to the KMT-authored Lee referendum. Meanwhile, Lu filed suit in 2014 in the Taipei High Administrative Court over the Executive Yuan's rejection of the earlier referendum. The court's decision is expected in August 2014. Taipower applied for the initial fuel loading of Unit 1 on December 31, 2013.

A competing referendum was launched in 2012 by National Taiwan University professor Kao Cheng-yan, initially as a local referendum and then a national one in July 2014, once sufficient signatures had been gathered. The language of the Kao referendum was formulated to require positive action: "Do you agree to allow Taiwan Power Co to insert fuel rods into the Fourth Nuclear Power Plant in New Taipei City for a test run" so poor voter turnout would result in referendum defeat, and thus create binding opposition to starting the plant.

=== Unit 1 completion and 2014 referendum ===
In April 2014, the government decided to halt construction. The first reactor was sealed after the completion of safety checks, and construction of the second reactor was halted. A final decision on whether to proceed with construction would be subject to another referendum. The ruling KMT stated the purpose of a new referendum was to have the people decide the plant's fate while weighing the consequences of not bringing a major power source on-line. Electricity prices are estimated to rise by 14–40%, and electricity rationing could be imposed as early as 2021. Completely cancelling the plant would force Taipower to book the construction budget as a total loss and force it into insolvency.

Meanwhile, also in April 2014, the opposition DPP planned to introduce special legislation to bypass the provisions of the Referendum Act, allowing a simple majority vote (with no threshold of participation) to decide the plant's fate. Premier Jiang Yi-huah cited the prior 2000 precedent when construction was interrupted by executive order which was later ruled unconstitutional as the reason why he rejected the proposed special legislation. The Executive Yuan stated the plant could start operations if the referendum on halting construction was not held, assuming safety tests were passed first. Former DPP chairman Lin Yi-hsiung went on a hunger strike for two weeks to oppose continued construction, reflecting a popular poll, which favored lowering the threshold of participation and opposed continued construction.

The proposed Kao referendum was rejected by the Executive Yuan Referendum Review Committee in August 2014, citing the language as confusing and contradictory, since the reason given for the referendum is in opposition to nuclear power, while the referendum itself asks to start a nuclear reactor, despite the referendum gathering more than 120,000 signatures. Undaunted, supporters of the Kao referendum vowed in October 2014 to initiate another referendum. That same month, Unit 1 completed the required safety tests before the start of operations. 126 systems were tested including cooling, shutdown, containment, control and power generation. Minister of Economic Affairs Chang Chia-juch said, "Passing the rigorous review illustrates the high standards of care invested in the design and construction of the facility."

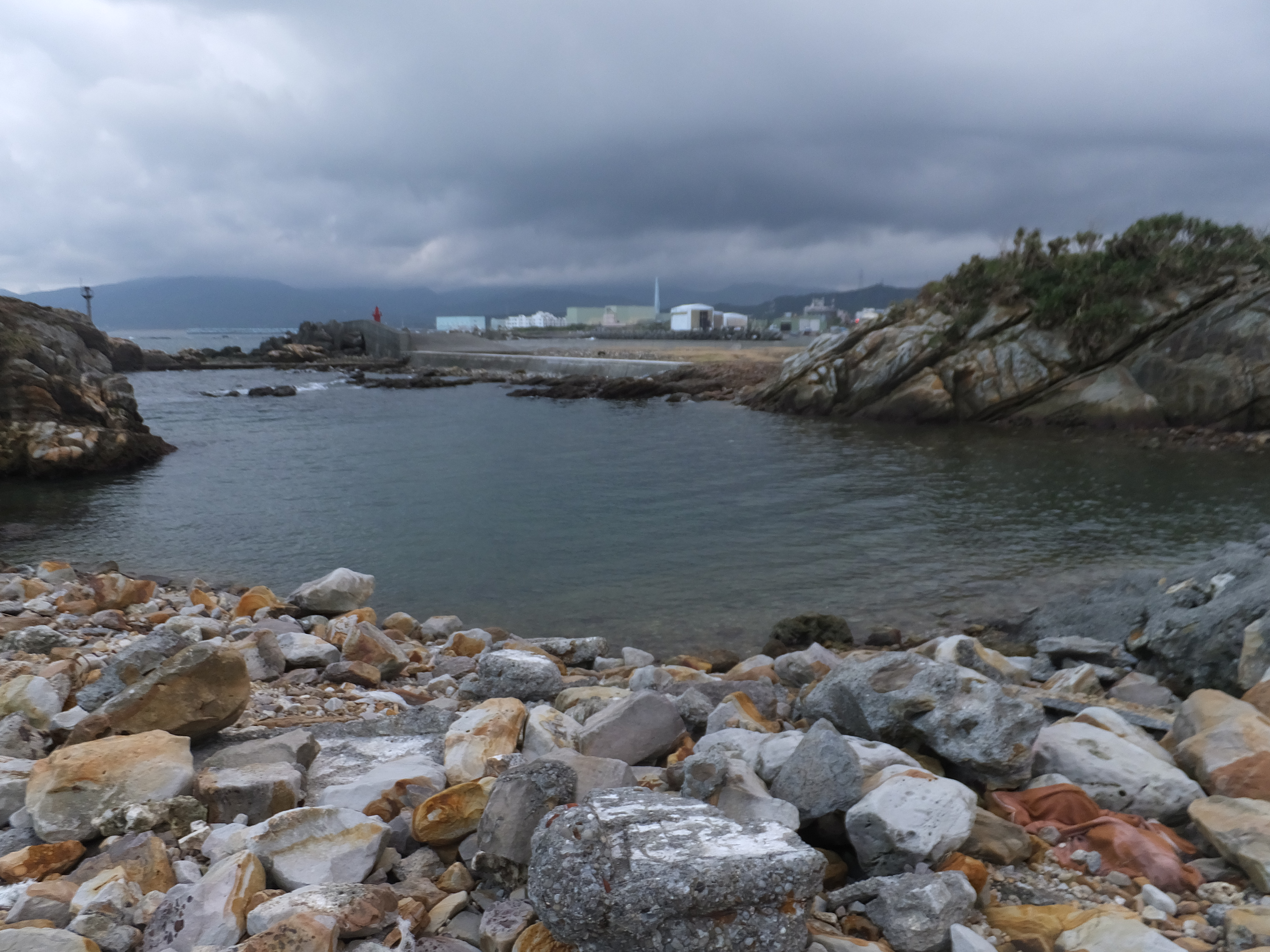
Lungmen plant, as seen from the coast along Gongliao (2015)

Past polls in Taiwan have shown more support for nuclear power among educated than uneducated people. The China Times poll taken in 2000 showed 60% support among those with higher degrees, and only 40% among those with only primary education.

=== Three-year deferment ===
The Ministry of Economic Affairs proposed in August 2014 that further construction be halted for three years until a national referendum could be held; Taipower estimated the three-year cost of sealing Unit 1 as less than NT$2 billion.

In September 2014 Taiwan Power Co. submitted its plan to the Atomic Energy Council (AEC) to mothball Unit 1 and halt construction on Unit 2 of the No. 4 nuclear power plant for three years, beginning in 2015. The plan, written in accordance with the April 2014 government directive to halt construction, underwent several revisions until its final submission in January 2015; the AEC approved Taipower's final plan in February, and it will take effect in July 2015 and run through 2017. Of the 126 systems which passed safety testing, 80 will remain in operation, 14 require periodic testing to ensure they can support their safety functions and 32 will be kept in low-humidity storage. It was estimated the cost of maintaining the mothballed reactor is 1.3 billion NT Dollars per year. With the formal entry into mothball status on July 1, Unit 1 is required to resubmit the application for initial fuel loading.

In September 2015 GE started International Court of Arbitration proceedings over withheld payments.

=== Continued freeze ===
In 2018, Taipower started shipping unused fuel rods back to the US. Taipower is required to remove all fuel rods from the plant by 2020. The ruling Democratic Progressive Party plans to shut down all nuclear plants in Taiwan by 2025. The removal of the fuel rods may mean that the plant's construction will never be restarted. Taipower stated it would take at least six years to start commercial operations at Unit 1 due to fuel removal, obsolescence of components in the ABWR NSSS, and startup testing.

In December 2021, the proposal of the re-construction of the plant was rejected, further ensuring that the construction would not be restarted in near future.

== Design ==
Lungmen Nuclear Power Plant consists of two identical ABWR units, each with a rated thermal power of 3,926 MW (1.340×10^{10} BTU/h); the core is composed of 872 GE14 fuel assemblies, and water is circulated using ten reactor internal pumps at a rate of 52.2×10^{6} kg/h (1.15×10^{8} lb/h), generating 7.637×10^{6} kg/h (1.684×10^{7} lb/h) of steam at full power.

=== Safety ===
A Generation III nuclear reactor has a 72-hour capability of passive cooling to prevent damage to its core should the plant face a total blackout after an emergency shut down. If core overheating and meltdown became unavoidable, these reactors have core catchers that will trap the molten fuel and stop the nuclear reaction (although Lungmen, as other ABWR does not have a core catcher but rely on passive cooling of the corium). Finally, a tight containment ensures that no evacuation zone is required around a Generation III nuclear power plant.

The ABWR was designed to a 0.3G earthquake acceleration standard with the Lungmen units seismic hardening increased to 0.4G.

=== Reliability ===
Some custom made power plants have lower reliability in the first few years of operation. Some parts may prove unsuitable and need replacement or modifications may be necessary. ABWR uses standardized parts to avoid this, but the 3rd and 4th units displayed low reliability (45% - 70%). It is believed this experience provided knowledge that will give better results in future units. The first two units built, Kashiwazaki Kariwa 6 & 7 fared much better than the following two, Hamaoka 5 and Shika 2.

== See also ==
- Nuclear power in Taiwan
- List of power stations in Taiwan
- Electricity sector in Taiwan
