= Advanced boiling water reactor =

Nuclear reactor design

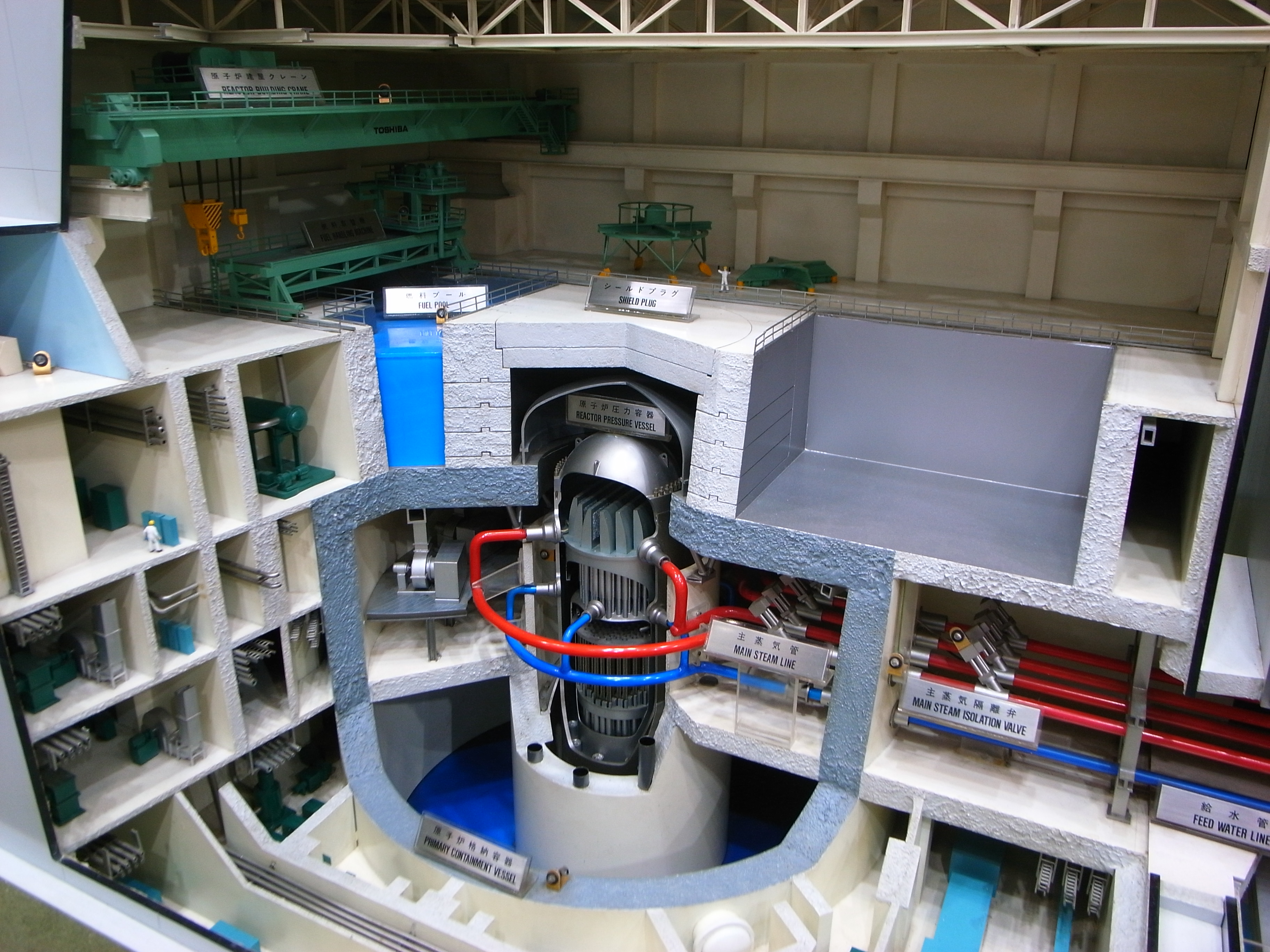
Model of the Toshiba ABWR

The advanced boiling water reactor (ABWR) is a Generation III boiling water reactor. The ABWR is currently offered by GE Vernova Hitachi Nuclear Energy (GVH) and Toshiba. The ABWR generates electrical power by using steam to power a turbine connected to a generator; the steam is boiled from water using heat generated by fission reactions within nuclear fuel. Kashiwazaki-Kariwa unit 6 is considered the first Generation III reactor in the world.

Boiling water reactors (BWRs) are the second most common form of light water reactor with a direct cycle design that uses fewer large steam supply components than the pressurized water reactor (PWR), which employs an indirect cycle. The ABWR is the present state of the art in boiling water reactors, and is the first Generation III reactor design to be fully built, with several reactors complete and operating. The first reactors were built in Japan The projects in both Taiwan and US are reported to be over-budget.

The standard ABWR plant design has a net electrical output of about 1.35 GW, generated from about 3926 MW of thermal power.

== Overview of the design ==
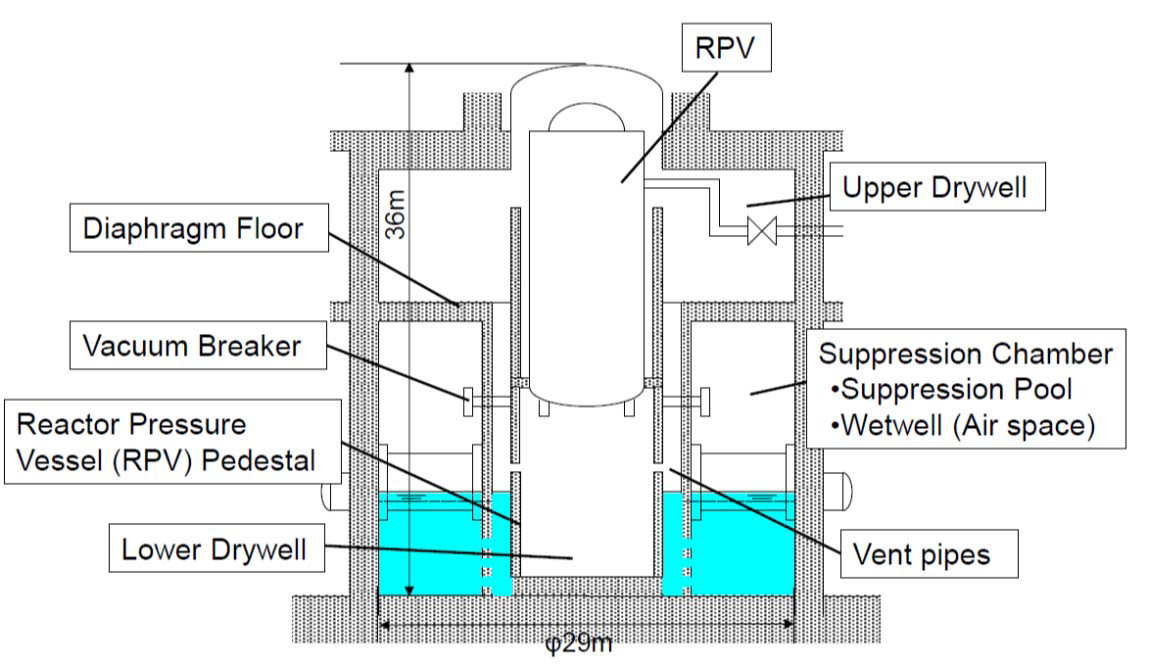
Cross section of UK ABWR design Reinforced Concrete Containment Vessel (RCCV)

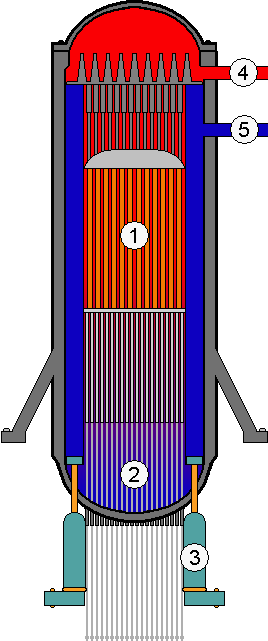
Pressure vessel from the ABWR. 1: Reactor core 2: Control rods 3: Internal Water Pump 4: Steam pipeline to the Turbine generator 5: Cooling water flow to the core

The ABWR represents an evolutionary route for the BWR family, with numerous changes and improvements to previous BWR designs.

Major areas of improvement include:

- The addition of reactor internal pumps (RIP) mounted on the bottom of the reactor pressure vessel (RPV) – 10 in total – which achieve improved performance while eliminating large recirculation pumps in containment and associated large-diameter and complex piping interfaces with the RPV (e.g. the recirculation loop found in earlier BWR models). Only the RIP motor is located outside of the RPV in the ABWR. According to the Tier 1 Design Control Document (which is the officially certified Nuclear Regulatory Commission document generally describing the design of the plant), each RIP has a nominal capacity of 6912 m^{3}/h.
- The control rod adjustment capabilities have been supplemented with the addition of an electro-hydraulic Fine Motion Control Rod Drive (FMCRD), allowing for fine position adjustment using an electrical motor, while not losing the reliability or redundancy of traditional hydraulic systems which are designed to accomplish rapid shutdown in 2.80 s from receipt of an initiating signal, or ARI (alternate rod insertion) in a greater but still insignificant time period. The FMCRD also improves defense-in-depth in the event of primary hydraulic and ARI contingencies.
- A fully digital Reactor Protection System (RPS) (with redundant digital backups as well as redundant manual backups) ensures a high level of reliability and simplification for safety condition detection and response. This system initiates rapid hydraulic insertion of control rods for shutdown (known as SCRAM by nuclear engineers) when needed. Two-out-of-four per parameter rapid shutdown logic ensures that nuisance rapid shutdowns are not triggered by single instrument failures. RPS can also trigger ARI, FMCRD rod run-in to shut down the nuclear chain reaction. The standby liquid control system (SLCS) actuation is provided as diverse logic in the unlikely event of an Anticipated Transient Without Scram.
- Fully digital reactor controls (with redundant digital backup and redundant manual (analog) backups) allow the control room to easily and rapidly control plant operations and processes. Separate redundant safety and non-safety related digital multiplexing buses allow for reliability and diversity of instrumentation and control.
  - In particular, the reactor is automated for startup (i.e., initiate the nuclear chain reaction and ascent to power) and for standard shutdown using automatic systems only. Of course, human operators remain essential to reactor control and supervision, but much of the busy-work of bringing the reactor to power and descending from power can be automated at operator discretion.
- The Emergency Core Cooling System (ECCS) has been improved in many areas, providing a very high level of defense-in-depth against accidents, contingencies, and incidents.
  - The overall system has been divided up into 3 divisions; each division is capable – by itself – of reacting to the maximally contingent Limiting Fault/Design Basis Accident (DBA) and terminating the accident prior to core uncovery, even in the event of loss of offsite power and loss of proper feedwater. Previous BWRs had 2 divisions, and uncovery (but no core damage) was predicted to occur for a short time in the event of a severe accident, prior to ECCS response.
  - Eighteen SORVs (safety overpressure relief valves), eight of which are part of the ADS (automatic depressurization system), ensure that RPV overpressure events are quickly mitigated, and that if necessary, that the reactor can be depressurized rapidly to a level where low pressure core flooder (LPCF, the high-capacity mode of the residual heat removal system, which replaces the LPCI and LPCS in previous BWR models) can be used.
  - Further, LPCF can inject against much higher RPV pressures, providing an increased level of safety in the event of intermediate-sized breaks, which could be small enough to result in slow natural depressurization but could be large enough to result in high pressure corespray/coolant injection systems' capacities for response being overwhelmed by the size of the break.
  - Though the Class 1E (safety-related) power bus is still powered by 3 highly-reliable emergency diesel generators that are safety related, an additional Plant Investment Protection power bus using a combustion gas turbine is located on-site to generate electricity to provide defense-in-depth against station blackout contingencies as well as to power important but non-safety-critical systems in the event of a loss of offsite power.
  - Though one division of the ECCS does not have high pressure flood (HPCF) capacities, there exists a steam-driven, safety-rated reactor core isolation cooling (RCIC) turbopump that is high-pressure rated and has extensive battery backup for its instrumentation and control systems, ensuring cooling is maintained even in the event of a full station blackout with failure of all 3 emergency diesel generators, the combustion gas turbine, primary battery backup, and the diesel firewater pumps.
  - There exists an extremely thick basaltic reinforced concrete pad under the RPV that will both catch and hold any heated core melt that might fall on that pad in extraordinarily contingent situations. In addition, there are several fusible links within the wall separating the wetwell from the lower drywell that flood the pad using the wetwell's water supply, ensuring cooling of that area even with the failure of standard mitigation systems.
- The containment has been significantly improved over the conventional Mark I type. Like the conventional Mark I type, it is of the pressure suppression type, designed to handle evolved steam in the event of a transient, incident, or accident by routing the steam using pipes that go into a pool of water enclosed in the wetwell (or torus in the case of the Mark I), the low temperature of which will condense the steam back into liquid water. This will keep containment pressure low. Notably, the typical ABWR containment has numerous hardened layers between the interior of the primary containment and the outer shield wall, and is cubical in shape. One major enhancement is that the reactor has a standard safe shutdown earthquake acceleration of .3G; further, it is designed to withstand a tornado with >320 mph wind speed. Seismic hardening is possible in earthquake-prone areas and has been done at the Lungmen facility in Taiwan which has been hardened up 0.4 g in any direction. The containment is inerted with nitrogen before operation to prevent fires, and can be deinerted after reactor shutdown for maintenance.
- The ABWR is designed for a lifetime of at least 60 years. The comparatively simple design of the ABWR also means that no expensive steam generators need to be replaced either, decreasing total cost of operation.
- According to GVH's Probabilistic Risk Assessment, a core damage event would occur no more often than once in six million years as the core damage frequency (CDF) of the ABWR is 1.6×10^{−7}, second in lowest CDF probability to the ESBWR.

The RPV and Nuclear Steam Supply System (NSSS) have significant improvements, such as the substitution of RIPs, eliminating conventional external recirculation piping loops and pumps in the containment that in turn drive jet pumps producing forced flow in the RPV. RIPs provide significant improvements related to reliability, performance and maintenance, including a reduction in occupational radiation exposure related to containment activities during maintenance outages. These pumps are powered by wet-rotor motors with the housings connected to the bottom of the RPV and eliminating large diameter external recirculation pipes that are possible leakage paths. The 10 internal recirculation pumps are located at the bottom of the annulus downcomer region (i.e., between the core shroud and the inside surface of the RPV). Consequently, internal recirculation pumps eliminate all of the jet pumps in the RPV, all of the large external recirculation loop pumps and piping, the isolation valves and the large diameter nozzles that penetrated the RPV and needed to suction water from and return it to the RPV. This design therefore reduces the worst leak below the core region to effectively equivalent to a 2-inch-diameter (51 mm) leak. The conventional BWR3-BWR6 product line has an analogous potential leak of 24 or more inches in diameter. A major benefit of this design is that it greatly reduces the flow capacity required of the ECCS.

The first reactors to use internal recirculation pumps were designed by ASEA-Atom (now Westinghouse Electric Company by way of mergers and buyouts, which was owned by Toshiba) and built in Sweden. These plants have operated very successfully for many years.

The internal pumps reduce the required pumping power for the same flow to about half that required with the jet pump system with external recirculation loops. Thus, in addition to the safety and cost improvements due to eliminating the piping, the overall plant thermal efficiency is increased. Eliminating the external recirculation piping also reduces occupational radiation exposure to personnel during maintenance.

An operational feature in the ABWR design is electric fine motion control rod drives, first used in the BWRs of AEG (later Kraftwerk Union AG, now AREVA). Older BWRs use a hydraulic locking piston system to move the control rods in six-inch increments. The electric fine motion control rod design greatly enhances positive actual control rod position and similarly reduces the risk of a control rod drive accident to the point that no velocity limiter is required at the base of the cruciform control rod blades.

== Certifications and approvals ==
Slightly different versions of the ABWR are offered by GE Vernova Hitachi, Hitachi-GE (the portion of GE Vernova Hitachi which operates in Japan), and Toshiba.

In 1997 the GE-Hitachi U.S. ABWR design was certified as a final design in final form by the U.S. Nuclear Regulatory Commission, meaning that its performance, efficiency, output, and safety have already been verified, making it bureaucratically easier to build it rather than a non-certified design.

In 2013, following its purchase of Horizon Nuclear Power, Hitachi began the process of generic design assessment of the Hitachi-GE ABWR with the UK Office for Nuclear Regulation. This was completed in December 2017.

In July 2016 Toshiba withdrew the U.S. design certification renewal for the ABWR because "it has become increasingly clear that energy price declines in the US prevent Toshiba from expecting additional opportunities for ABWR construction projects".

== Locations ==
The ABWR is licensed to operate in Japan, the United States and Taiwan, although most of the construction projects have been halted or shelved.

=== Japan and Taiwan ===
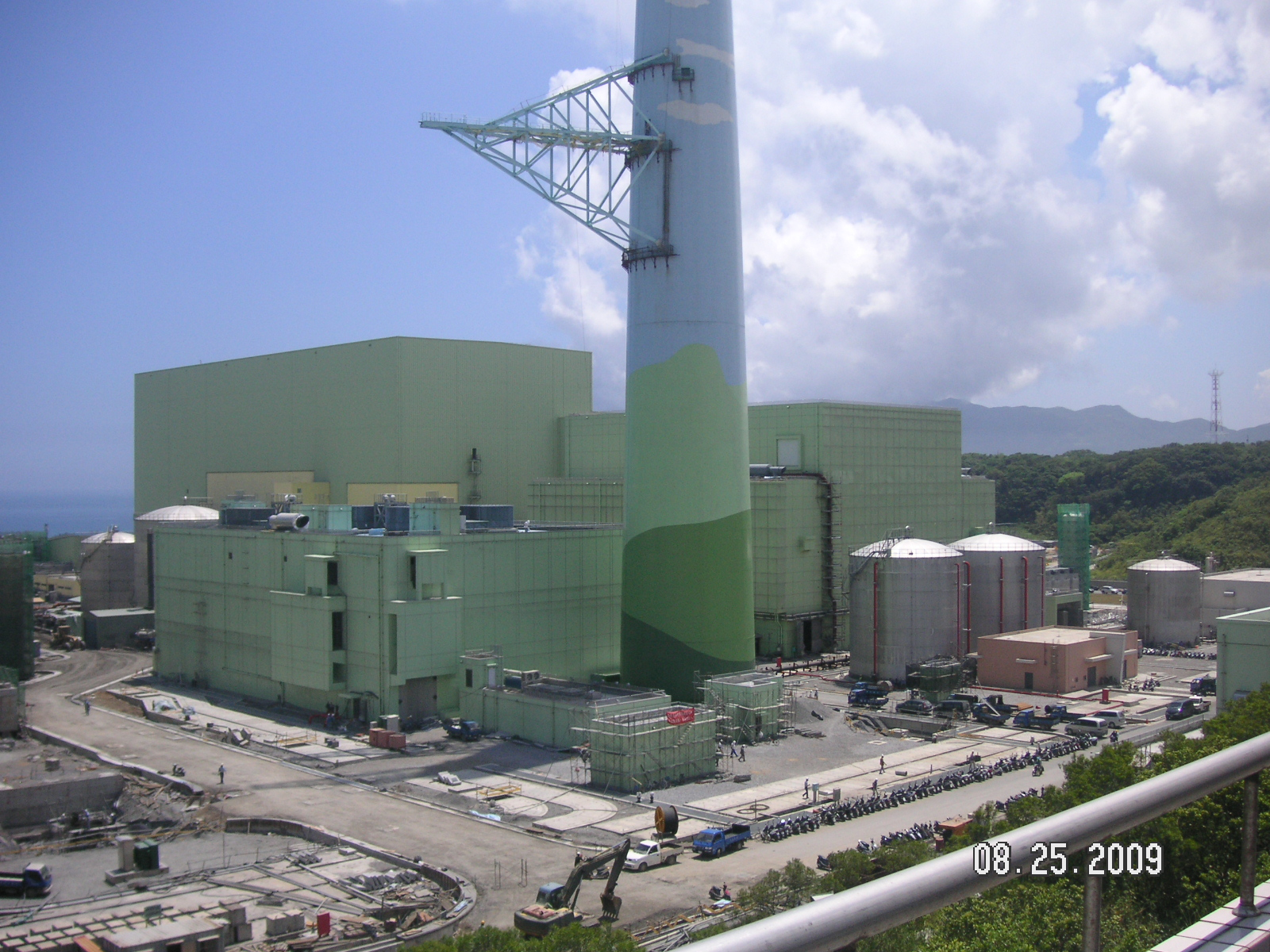
Construction of ABWR at Lungmen Nuclear Power Plant in New Taipei City, Taiwan

As of December 2006, four ABWRs were in operation in Japan: Kashiwazaki-Kariwa units 6 and 7, which opened in 1996 and 1997, Hamaoka unit 5, opened 2004 having started construction in 2000, and Shika 2 commenced commercial operations on March 15, 2006. Another two partially constructed reactors are in Lungmen in Taiwan, and one more (Shimane Nuclear Power Plant 3) in Japan. Work on Lungmen halted in 2014. Work on Shimane halted after the 2011 earthquake.

==== Kashiwazaki-Kariwa ====
It is the first installation of the plant. After the March 11, 2011 earthquake, all restarted units were shut down and safety improvements are being carried out. As of October 2017, no units have been restarted, and the earliest proposed restart date is in April 2019 (for reactors 6 and 7 that using ABWR).

==== Shika ====
The plant is currently not producing electricity in the wake of the 2011 Fukushima Daiichi nuclear disaster.

==== Hamaoka ====
On May 14, 2011, Hamaoka 5 was shut down by the request of the Japanese government.

==== Shimane ====
The Shimane 3 construction suspended in 2011.

==== Higashidōri ====
There is no firm plan for construction in Higashidōri NPP.

==== Ōma ====
In December 2014 J-Power applied for safety checks at the Oma nuclear plant, slated for startup in 2026.

=== United States ===
On June 19, 2006 NRG Energy filed a Letter of Intent with the Nuclear Regulatory Commission to build two 1358 MWe ABWRs at the South Texas Project site. On September 25, 2007, NRG Energy and CPS Energy submitted a Construction and Operations License (COL) request for these plants with the NRC. NRG Energy is a merchant generator and CPS Energy is the nation's largest municipally owned utility. The COL was approved by the NRC on February 9, 2016. Due to market conditions, these two planned units may never be built and do not have a planned construction date.

=== United Kingdom ===
Horizon Nuclear Power had plans to build Hitachi-GE ABWRs at Wylfa in Wales and Oldbury in England. Both projects were paused in March 2012 by the shareholders at the time (RWE and E-ON) to put Horizon up for sale, with Hitachi becoming the new owner. The 'Development Consent Order' for Wylfa was accepted in June 2018 and in August Bechtel were appointed as project managers. The first reactor was expected online in the mid-2020s with construction at Oldbury expected to start a few years after this. However, on January 17, 2019, Horizon Nuclear Power announced the suspension of both these projects for financial reasons.

== Reliability ==
In comparison with comparable designs, the four ABWRs in operation are often shut down due to technical problems. The International Atomic Energy Agency documents this with the 'operating factor' (the time with electricity feed-in relative to the total time since commercial operation start). The first two plants in Kashiwazaki-Kariwa (block 6 & 7) reach total life operating factors of 70%, meaning that about 30% of the time, since commissioning, they were not producing electricity. For example, in 2010 Kashiwazaki-Kariwa 6 had an operating capacity of 80.9%, and an operating capacity of 93% in 2011. However, in 2008 it did not produce any power as the installation was offline for maintenance, and therefore had an operating capacity of 0% for that year. In contrast other modern nuclear power plants like the Korean OPR-1000 or the German Konvoi show operating factors of about 90%.

The output power of the two new ABWRs at the Hamaoka and Shika power plant had to be lowered because of technical problems in the power plants steam turbine section. After throttling both power plants down, they still have a heightened downtime and show a lifetime operating factor under 50%.

Reactor block	Net output power (planned net output power)	Planned net output power	Commercial operation start	Operating Factor since commissioning start until 2011
Hamaoka 5	1212 MW	(1325 MW)	18.01.2005	46,7%
Kashiwazaki-Kariwa 6	1315 MW		07.11.1996	72%
Kashiwazaki-Kariwa 7	1315 MW		02.07.1996	68,5%
Shika 2	1108 MW	(1304 MW)	15.03.2006	47,1%

== Deployments ==
Unit	Unit	Rated Capacity	Location	Operator	Construction Started	Year Completed (First criticality)	Cost (USD)	Notes
Kashiwazaki-Kariwa 6		1356 MW	Kashiwazaki, Japan	TEPCO	1992	1996		
Kashiwazaki-Kariwa 7		1356 MW	Kashiwazaki, Japan	TEPCO	1993	1996		
Shika 2		1358 MW	Shika, Japan	Hokuriku Electric Power Company	2001	2005		
Hamaoka 5		1267 MW	Omaezaki, Japan	Chuden	2000	2005		
Shimane 3		1373 MW	Matsue, Japan	Chugoku Electric Power Company	2007			
Lungmen 1		1350 MW	Gongliao Township, Taiwan	Taiwan Power Company	1997	After 2017	$9.2 Billion	
Lungmen 2		1350 MW	Gongliao Township, Taiwan	Taiwan Power Company	1997	After 2017	$9.2 Billion	
Higashidōri (Tōhoku) 2		1385 MW	Higashidōri, Japan	Tohoku Electric Power	No firm plans			
Higashidōri (Tokyo) 1		1385 MW	Higashidōri, Japan	TEPCO	No firm plans			
Higashidōri (Tokyo) 2		1385 MW	Higashidōri, Japan	TEPCO	No firm plans			
Ōma		1383 MW	Ōma, Japan	J-Power	2010	2026		
South Texas Project 1		1358 MW	Bay City, Texas, United States	NRG Energy, TEPCO and CPS Energy			$14 billion	
South Texas Project 2		1358 MW	Bay City, Texas, United States	NRG Energy, TEPCO and CPS Energy			$14 billion	

== Further development ==
=== ABWR-II ===
A number of design variants have been considered, with power outputs varying from 600 to 1800 MWe. The most developed design variant is the ABWR-II, started in 1991, an enlarged 1718 MWe ABWR, intended to make nuclear power generation more competitive in the late 2010s. None of these designs have been deployed.

Comparison between ABWR and ABWR-II
	ABWR-II	ABWR
Electric Power (MWe)	1700	1356
Reactor thermal power (MWt)	4960	3926
Maximum core flow rate (t/hr)	62100	57900
Active core height (m)	3.71	3.71
Fuel bundle pitch (mm)	233.0	154.9
Number of Control Rod Drives	197	205
Number of fuel bundles	424	872
Volumetric power (kW/l)	58.1	50.6
Power ratio (kW/kg)	26.1	26.1

The new designs hoped to achieve 20% reductions in operating costs, 30% reduction in capital costs, and tight planned construction schedule of 30 months. The design would allow for more flexibility in choices of nuclear fuels.

=== Economic Simplified Boiling Water Reactor ===
Economic Simplified Boiling Water Reactor (ESBWR) is a passively safe generation III+ reactor design derived from its predecessor, the Simplified Boiling Water Reactor (SBWR) and from the Advanced Boiling Water Reactor (ABWR) based on previous Boiling Water Reactor.

=== Highly Innovative ABWR (HI-ABWR) ===
Hitachi-GE Nuclear Energy tries to develop derivative Highly Innovative ABWR (HI-ABWR).

=== iBR ===
As Toshiba planned to develop boiling-water reactor, Toshiba intends to introduce intelligence and inexpensive BWR (iBR) as next generation of BWR.

== See also ==
- Nuclear power
- Nuclear safety in the U.S.
- Economics of new nuclear power plants
- Pressurized water reactor
- Reduced moderation water reactor
- Advanced Heavy Water Reactor

=== Other Gen III+ designs ===
- EPR
- AP1000
- ESBWR
- US-APWR
- ACR
- Framatom Kerena
