= Higashidōri Nuclear Power Plant =

Building in Aomori Prefecture, Japan

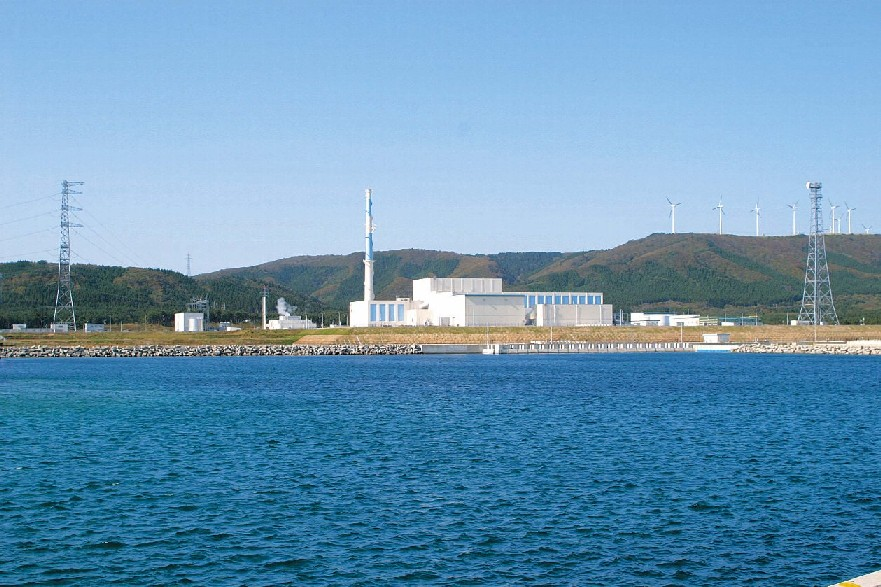
- Country: Japan
- Coordinates: 41°11′17″N 141°23′25″E
- Status: Out of service for 14 years, 10 months
- Construction began: November 7, 2000
- Commission date: December 8, 2005
- Operators: Tōhoku Electric Power Company; Tokyo Electric Power Company

Power generation
- Units operational: 1 × 1,100 MW
- Units planned: 3 × 1,385 MW
- Nameplate capacity: 1,100 MW
- Capacity factor: 0%
- Annual net output: 0 GW·h

External links
- Website: www.tohoku-epco.co.jp/genshi/higashi/
- Commons: Related media on Commons

The Higashidōri Nuclear Power Plant (東通原子力発電所, Higashidōri genshiryoku hatsudensho; Higashidōri NPP) is located in the village of Higashidōri in northeastern Aomori Prefecture, on the Shimokita Peninsula, facing the Pacific Ocean. The plant has not generated electricity since Japan's 2011 nationwide nuclear shutdown in the aftermath of the Fukushima Daiichi nuclear disaster.

The plant is unique in Japan in that it is two adjoining sites, one run by one company, the Tōhoku Electric Power Company and the other run by the Tokyo Electric Power Company. The reactors are all of Toshiba design.

Construction of Tohoku Electric's Higashidori Unit 1 began in November 2000 and was completed in December 2005. The design was based on Tohoku Electric's Onagawa Nuclear Power Plant Unit 3, with improvements to the reactor vessel to allow for greater ease in inspection and maintenance. A separate building, apart from the containment structure, is dedicated specifically for the heat exchanger system based on seawater to provide primary coolant for the reactor.

== Earthquake safety ==
On 24 October 2011 a research group under professor Mitsuhisa Watanabe of Toyo University published a report that raised questions about the seismic safety of the plant-site. A number of faults are present under the complex and in this study it is unclear whether these faults might be active, as some experts noted recently in the NISA safety-screening process. In the study, the researchers said that certain characteristics are typical for the existence of active faults under the plant site, when they analyzed the surveys conducted by the two utilities for constructing the reactors there. Tohoku Electric and TEPCO, denied that there were active faults, and said that the faults were shaped by the swelling of water-bearing strata. Professor emeritus from Hiroshima University, who took part in the analysis, criticized the utilities for this denial. The new report might have an effect on the decision whether to resume operations of the reactor, and could also affect the earthquake-proof safety screenings of other nuclear plants.

On 20 December 2012 a panel of the Japanese Nuclear Regulatory Authority determined that two geologic faults under the nuclear plant were geological active: one fault called F-3 running vertically through the southern part of the plant's grounds close by the reactor 1 and another fault called F-9, that is running parallel with F-3.

Although Tohoku Electric Power claimed that the deformations inside the geological layers were the result of the swelling of clay minerals after they were exposed to water, Kunihiko Shimazaki, commissioner of the Nuclear Regulation Authority and head of the panel, said at the meeting that any argument that the faults were not active was totally unacceptable.

In the application for permission to construct the No. 1 reactor at the Higashidori plant in 1996, Tohoku Electric Power Co. reported that there would be no active faults under the plant's premises. In another report submitted to the government in 2008 in response to the 2006 revision to the government's seismic-resistance design screening guidelines, the company asserted "There are no active faults in the neighborhood within 5 kilometers (from the Higashidori plant)." According to Shimazaki, chairman of the team of experts, the old sketches (of layers studied by Tohoku Electric) lacked credibility.

On 18 February 2012 the NRA-panel of experts presented their draft report on the fault complex at the premises of the nuclear reactor site. Their conclusions:

- two faults, named "F-3" and "F-9," did produce several strike-slip thrusts within the past 110,000 years or so
- the activity from the eight other F-type faults within the nuclear plant were "linked systematically."
- an evaluation of the "F-1"-fault, that runs under the water-intake facility of the nuclear power plant was needed, because geological changes might have occurred in a period 120.000 to 130.000 years ago.

These conclusions could cause an extra examination of the seismic resistance of the reactor buildings and re-enforcing them.

On 14 February 2013 Tohoku Electric Power Co. made a request to the government to raise the electric power rates, while the company thought that the No. 1 reactor could be restarted around July 2015. At the presentation of the report, Tohoku Electric Power opposed these findings, and argued that water influx had caused the swelling of the geological layers, and it would start their own investigations the next day. The NRA-panel saw no grounds for this reasoning, they did not want to wait and planned to finalize the report with other experts.

== Reactors run by Tohoku Electric Company ==
The Unit 1 was commissioned on March 9, 2005, and then began commercial operation on December 12, 2005. The site area is 3,580,000 m^{2} (885 acres).

Unit	Type	First Criticality	Electric Power
Tōhoku Higashidori - 1	BWR	March 9, 2005	1100 MW
Tōhoku Higashidori - 2 (planned)	ABWR	construction start scheduled for 2016	1385 MW

== Reactors run by Tokyo Electric Company ==
Tepco began construction of its Higashidori-1 unit on January 25, 2011, after approval by METI. The total area of the site is 4.5 square kilometres (1.7 sq mi).

Unit	Type	First Criticality	Electric Power
Tokyo Higashidori - 1	ABWR	construction deferred, schedule to be defined	1385 MW
Tokyo Higashidori - 2 (planned)	ABWR	schedule to be defined	1385 MW

== Events ==
Although the plant was in maintenance shutdown during the 2011 Tohoku earthquake and tsunami, the 7 April aftershock caused the loss of all external power and the plant had to switch to backup power to supply cooling to the spent fuel pool where the reactor's fuel rods were being stored. There were no accidents.

== See also ==
- List of nuclear power plants in Japan
