= List of nuclear power plants in Japan =

The following is a list of Japanese nuclear power plants. After the Fukushima Daiichi nuclear disaster, all 17 major plants were shut down. As of 2022, only 6 out of 17 major nuclear power plants operate in the country, operated by the Kyushu Electric Power (Kyuden), Shikoku Electric Power Company (Yonden) and Kansai Electric Power Company (Kanden).

identifier
Plant pending restart approval
Pending restart with government approval
Plant operating with limited capacity (some reactors pending restart approval)
Plant operating at full operational capacity
Plant shut down indefinitely
Parts of plant shut down for maintenance or refuelling

Nuclear power station	Photo	Location	Coordinates	Status	Units	References
Fukushima Daiichi Nuclear Power Plant		Ōkuma	37°25′17″N 141°01′57″E	Facility damaged beyond repair during the 2011 Great Tohoku Earthquake.	6 (all in decommissioning phase)	
Fukushima Daini Nuclear Power Plant		Naraha	37°19′10″N 141°01′16″E	Facility rendered inoperable due to seawater deluge caused by the 2011 Great Tohoku Earthquake.	4 (all in decommissioning phase)	
Genkai Nuclear Power Plant		Genkai	33°30′56″N 129°50′14″E	Units 3 and 4 in operation. Units 1 and 2 are permanently shut down.	4 (2 in decommissioning phase)	
Hamaoka Nuclear Power Plant		Omaezaki	34°37′25″N 138°08′33″E	Facility indefinitely shut down due to unsafe seismic conditions.	5	
Higashidōri Nuclear Power Plant		Higashidōri	41°11′17″N 141°23′25″E	Facility currently shut down pending restart following the 2011 Great Tohoku Earthquake.	2	
Ikata Nuclear Power Plant		Ikata	33°29′27″N 132°18′41″E	Unit 3 in operation.	3 (1 in decommissioning phase)	
Kashiwazaki-Kariwa Nuclear Power Plant		Kashiwazaki	37°25′42″N 138°36′06″E	Unit 6 in operation. Units 7 ready for restart however there is no specified solution for units 1-5.	7 (largest nuclear generating station in the world by net electrical power rating)	
Mihama Nuclear Power Plant		Mihama	35°42′09″N 135°57′48″E	Unit 3 in operation	3	
Ōi Nuclear Power Plant		Ōi	35°32′26″N 135°39′07″E	Units 3 and 4 are in operation. Units 1 and 2 are permanently shut down.	4 (2 in decommissioning phase)	
Onagawa Nuclear Power Plant		Onagawa	38°24′04″N 141°29′59″E	Unit 2 in operation.	3	
Sendai Nuclear Power Plant		Satsumasendai	31°50′01″N 130°11′23″E	All units are in operation.	2	
Shika Nuclear Power Plant		Shika	37°03′40″N 136°43′35″E	Plant under consideration for decommissioning due to the presence of fault lines underneath the reactors.	2	
Shimane Nuclear Power Plant		Matsue	35°32′18″N 132°59′57″E	Facility currently shut down pending restart following the 2011 Great Tohoku Earthquake, construction on unit 3 halted.	3	
Takahama Nuclear Power Plant		Takahama	35°31′20″N 135°30′17″E	Units 1, 3, and 4 are in operation. Unit 2 was restarted September 15, 2023, and plans to restart commercial operations in October 2023.	4	
Tōkai Nuclear Power Plant		Tōkai	36°27′59″N 140°36′24″E	The facility has been decommissioned. The oldest nuclear power plant in Japan.	2 (1 decommissioned, 1 shut down)	
Tomari Nuclear Power Plant		Tomari, Shiribeshi Subprefecture	43°02′10″N 140°30′45″E	Facility currently shut down pending restart following the 2011 Great Tohoku Earthquake.	3	
Tsuruga Nuclear Power Plant		Tsuruga	35°40′22″N 136°04′38″E	Due to seismic conditions the plant remains shut down following the 2011 Great Tohoku Earthquake.	2 (1 decommissioned, 2 under construction)	
