= South Texas Nuclear Generating Station =

Nuclear power plant in Matagorda County, Texas

South Texas Project (STP) Electric Generating Station
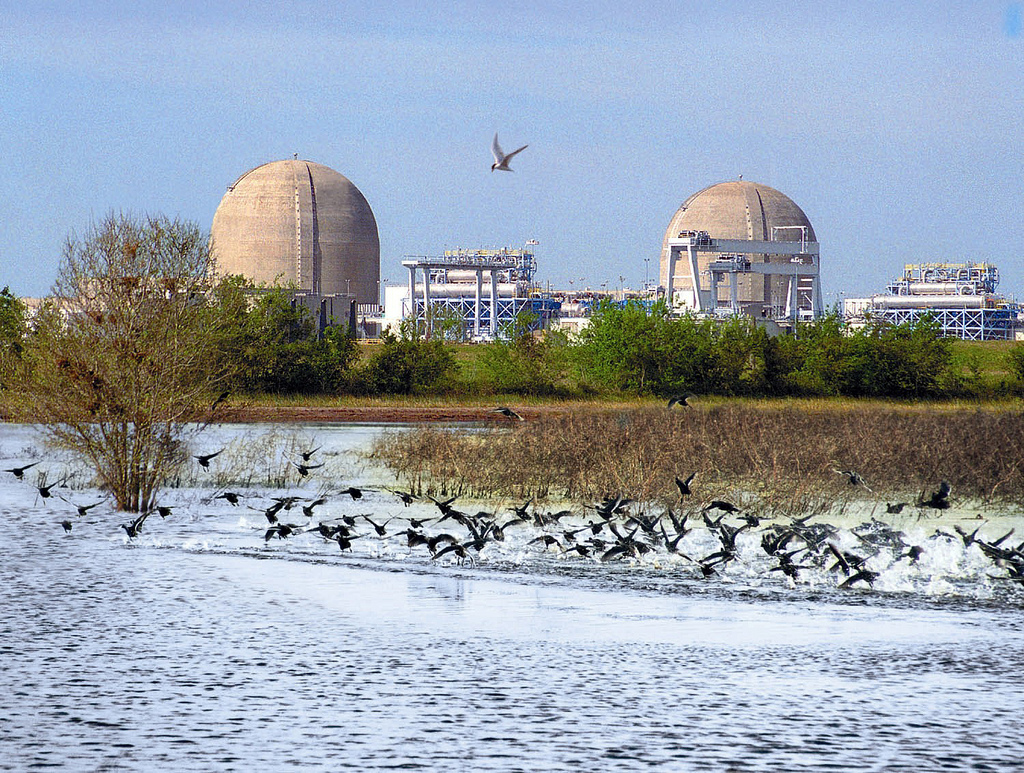
- South Texas Project, Units 1 & 2 (NRC image)
- Official name: South Texas Project Electric Generating Station
- Country: United States
- Location: Matagorda County, near Bay City, Texas
- Coordinates: 28°47′44″N 96°2′56″W
- Status: Operational
- Construction began: December 22, 1975
- Commission date: Unit 1: August 25, 1988; Unit 2: June 19, 1989
- Construction cost: Units 1–2: $12.55 billion (USD 2010) or $17.6 billion in 2024 dollars
- Owners: Constellation Energy (44%); City of San Antonio (40%); City of Austin (16%)
- Operator: STP Nuclear Operating Company (STPNOC)

Nuclear power station
- Reactor type: PWR
- Reactor supplier: Westinghouse
- Cooling source: Main Cooling Reservoir (7,000 acres (2,800 ha), up to 202,600 acre-feet (249,900,000 m^{3}) of cooling water storage, filled by pumping water from the Colorado River)
- Thermal capacity: 2 × 3853 MW_{th}

Power generation
- Units operational: 2 × 1280 MW
- Make and model: WH 4-loop (DRYAMB)
- Units cancelled: 2 × 1350 MW ABWR
- Nameplate capacity: 2560 MW
- Capacity factor: 97.16% (Unit 1, 2017-2019); 98.75% (Unit 2, 2017-2019); 85.6% (Unit 1, lifetime); 85.1% (Unit 2, lifetime)
- Annual net output: 21,920 GWh (2022)

External links
- Website: www.stpnoc.com
- Commons: Related media on Commons

The South Texas Project Electric Generating Station (also known as STP, STPEGS, South Texas Project), is a nuclear power station southwest of Bay City, Texas, United States. STP occupies a 12,200-acre (4,900 ha) site west of the Colorado River about 90 miles (140 km) southwest of Houston. It consists of two Westinghouse Pressurized Water Reactors and is cooled by a 7,000-acre (2,800 ha) reservoir, which eliminates the need for cooling towers.

== History ==
=== 1971–1994 ===
On December 6, 1971, Houston Lighting & Power Co. (HL&P), the City of Austin, the City of San Antonio, and the Central Power and Light Co. (CPL) initiated a feasibility study of constructing a jointly owned nuclear plant. The initial cost estimate for the plant was $974 million (equivalent to approximately $5,700,741,167 in 2015 dollars).

By mid-1973, HL&P and CPL had chosen Bay City as the site for the project and San Antonio had signed on as a partner in the project. Brown and Root was selected as the architect and construction company. On November 17, 1973, voters in Austin narrowly approved their city's participation and the city signed onto the project on December 1. Austin held several more referendums through the years on whether to stay in the project or not.

An application for plant construction permits was submitted to the Atomic Energy Commission, now the Nuclear Regulatory Commission (NRC), in May 1974 and the NRC issued the permits on December 22, 1975. Construction started on December 22, 1975.

By 1978, the South Texas Project was two years behind schedule and had substantial cost overruns. A new management team had been put in place by HL&P in late 1978 to deal with the cost overruns, schedule delays and other challenges. However, events at Three Mile Island in March 1979 had a substantial impact on the nuclear industry including STNP. The new team again moved forward with developing a new budget and schedule. Brown and Root revised their completion schedule to June 1989 and the cost estimate to $4.4–$4.8 billion. HL&P executives consulted with its own project manager and concluded that Brown and Root was not making satisfactory progress and a decision was reached to terminate their role as architect/engineer but retain them as constructor. Brown and Root was relieved as architect/engineer in September 1981 and Bechtel Corporation contracted to replace them. Less than two months later, Brown and Root withdrew as the construction contractor and Ebasco Constructors was hired to replace them in February 1982 as constructor.

Austin voters authorized the city council on November 3, 1981, to sell the city's 16 percent interest in the STP. No buyers were found.

Unit 1 reached initial criticality on March 8, 1988, and went into commercial operation on August 25. Unit 2 reached initial criticality on March 12, 1989, and went into commercial operation on June 19.

In February 1993, both units had to be taken offline to resolve issues with the steam-driven auxiliary feedwater pumps. They were not back in service until March (Unit 1) and May (Unit 2) of 1994. The history of STNP is somewhat unusual since most nuclear plants that were in the early stages of engineering construction at the time of the Three Mile Island event were never completed.

=== 2006–present ===
On June 19, 2006, NRG Energy filed a letter of intent with the NRC to build two 1,358-MWe advanced boiling water reactors (ABWRs) at the South Texas Nuclear Project site. South Texas Nuclear Project Partners CPS Energy and Austin Energy were not involved in the initial letter of intent and development plans.

On September 24, 2007, NRG Energy filed an application with the NRC to build two Toshiba ABWRs at the South Texas Nuclear Project site. It was the first application for a nuclear reactor submitted to the NRC since 1979. The proposed expansion would generate an additional 2700 MW of electrical generating capacity, which would double the capacity of the site. The total estimated cost of constructing the two reactors is $10 billion, or $13 billion with financing, according to Steve Bartley, interim general manager at CPS Energy.

In October 2009, main contractor Toshiba had informed CPS Energy that the cost would be "substantially greater," possibly up to $4 billion more. As a result of the escalating cost estimates for units 3 and 4, in 2010 CPS Energy reached an agreement with NRG Energy to reduce CPS's stake in the new units from 50% to 7.625%. To that point, CPS Energy had invested $370 million in the expanded plant. CPS Energy's withdrawal from the project put the expansion into jeopardy.

In October 2010, the South Texas Project announced that the Tokyo Electric Power Company (TEPCO) had entered into an agreement with Nuclear Innovation North America (a joint venture between the reactor manufacturer, Toshiba, and plant partner NRG Energy) which was the largest of the two stakeholders in the proposed reactors, to purchase an initial 9.2375% stake in the expansion for $125 million, and $30 million for an option to purchase an additional stake in the new units for $125 million more (resulting in approximately 18% ownership by TEPCO, or 500 MW of generation capacity). The agreement was made conditional upon STNP securing construction loan guarantees from the United States Department of Energy.

On 19 April 2011, NRG announced in a conference call with shareholders, that they had decided to abandon the permitting process on the two new units due to the ongoing expense of planning and slow permitting process. Anti-nuclear campaigners alleged that the financial situation of new partner TEPCO, combined with the ongoing Fukushima nuclear accident were also key factors in the decision. NRG has written off its investment of $331 million in the project.

Despite the April 2011 NRG announcement of the reactor's cancellation, the NRC continued the combined licensing process for the new reactors in October 2011. It was unclear at the time why the reactor license application was proceeding. During early 2015 some pre-construction activities were performed on site and initial NRC documents listed the original targeted commercial operational dates as March 2015 for unit 3 and a year later for the other unit. On February 9, 2016, the NRC approved the combined license. Due to market conditions, no construction events occurred at that time. The two planned units do not currently have a planned construction date.

On February 15, 2021, during a major power outage that impacted much of the state of Texas, an automatic reactor trip shut South Texas Nuclear Generation Station Unit 1 due to low steam generator levels. According to a Nuclear Regulatory Commission report, the low steam generator levels were due to loss of feedwater pumps 11 and 13. However, Unit 2 and both units at the Comanche Peak Nuclear Power Plant remained online during the power outage.

== Electricity production ==
Generation (MWh) of South Texas Project Electric Generating Station
| Year | Jan | Feb | Mar | Apr | May | Jun | Jul | Aug | Sep | Oct | Nov | Dec | Total |
|---|---|---|---|---|---|---|---|---|---|---|---|---|---|
| 2001 | 1,886,321 | 1,525,367 | 1,023,965 | 1,693,902 | 1,749,601 | 1,803,826 | 1,862,368 | 1,861,391 | 1,784,413 | 948,097 | 1,821,433 | 1,879,914 | 19,840,598 |
| 2002 | 1,877,631 | 1,694,952 | 1,874,294 | 1,802,364 | 1,853,569 | 1,651,816 | 1,804,722 | 1,863,231 | 1,809,080 | 961,912 | 648,839 | 1,207,192 | 19,049,602 |
| 2003 | 993,000 | 858,234 | 1,167,859 | 906,020 | 926,323 | 897,961 | 924,414 | 1,550,300 | 1,826,511 | 1,901,587 | 1,835,032 | 1,901,300 | 15,688,541 |
| 2004 | 1,794,208 | 1,783,984 | 1,866,066 | 967,940 | 1,898,881 | 1,833,986 | 1,888,035 | 1,886,885 | 1,832,462 | 1,898,705 | 1,846,256 | 1,874,559 | 21,371,967 |
| 2005 | 1,910,104 | 1,425,909 | 1,145,000 | 1,347,849 | 1,899,476 | 1,827,979 | 1,882,165 | 1,865,460 | 1,793,374 | 961,783 | 1,812,505 | 1,917,689 | 19,789,293 |
| 2006 | 1,918,500 | 1,734,226 | 1,916,180 | 1,848,924 | 1,902,066 | 1,835,603 | 1,894,140 | 1,889,118 | 1,754,581 | 949,107 | 1,751,295 | 1,974,529 | 21,368,269 |
| 2007 | 1,978,523 | 1,769,752 | 1,631,719 | 1,020,990 | 1,997,207 | 1,913,083 | 1,974,291 | 1,945,127 | 1,911,186 | 1,994,784 | 1,951,698 | 2,020,923 | 22,109,283 |
| 2008 | 2,027,749 | 1,894,252 | 1,857,380 | 1,059,644 | 1,996,808 | 1,911,071 | 1,970,008 | 1,968,743 | 1,883,018 | 1,091,075 | 1,804,680 | 2,028,321 | 21,492,749 |
| 2009 | 2,026,109 | 1,816,781 | 2,001,913 | 1,933,642 | 1,976,442 | 1,893,260 | 1,945,400 | 1,945,673 | 1,491,904 | 987,917 | 1,314,044 | 2,023,063 | 21,356,148 |
| 2010 | 1,901,689 | 1,616,544 | 1,878,021 | 959,782 | 1,894,264 | 1,905,405 | 1,965,866 | 1,889,669 | 1,908,067 | 2,000,442 | 1,180,689 | 2,026,343 | 21,126,781 |
| 2011 | 2,019,203 | 1,831,865 | 2,010,915 | 1,022,733 | 1,722,511 | 1,919,280 | 1,972,583 | 1,862,971 | 1,922,238 | 1,926,927 | 1,161,050 | 993,620 | 20,365,896 |
| 2012 | 1,000,676 | 932,122 | 954,597 | 1,191,768 | 1,996,956 | 1,916,509 | 1,972,364 | 1,968,957 | 1,917,986 | 1,618,514 | 1,046,510 | 2,027,134 | 18,544,093 |
| 2013 | 1,129,541 | 907,783 | 1,001,457 | 1,214,363 | 1,800,887 | 1,909,913 | 1,972,700 | 1,929,852 | 1,755,607 | 1,457,708 | 1,482,475 | 1,265,570 | 17,827,856 |
| 2014 | 1,996,545 | 1,803,728 | 1,467,789 | 949,590 | 965,031 | 1,819,148 | 1,938,482 | 1,937,255 | 1,886,353 | 1,964,871 | 1,929,852 | 1,993,023 | 20,651,667 |
| 2015 | 1,994,899 | 1,798,046 | 1,876,998 | 944,816 | 1,633,328 | 1,873,563 | 1,924,005 | 1,921,588 | 1,870,805 | 1,474,997 | 931,979 | 1,155,529 | 19,400,553 |
| 2016 | 1,867,890 | 1,853,605 | 1,971,083 | 1,899,518 | 1,791,929 | 1,869,512 | 1,921,476 | 1,921,320 | 1,863,053 | 1,199,327 | 1,551,143 | 1,984,447 | 21,694,303 |
| 2017 | 1,982,755 | 1,781,424 | 1,496,196 | 941,003 | 1,947,349 | 1,872,796 | 1,915,879 | 1,922,021 | 1,874,558 | 1,951,826 | 1,911,553 | 1,984,116 | 21,581,476 |
| 2018 | 1,990,840 | 1,791,895 | 1,716,130 | 1,026,669 | 1,948,056 | 1,862,498 | 1,926,877 | 1,926,702 | 1,862,974 | 1,104,073 | 1,542,275 | 1,988,643 | 20,687,632 |
| 2019 | 1,989,139 | 1,794,419 | 1,977,848 | 1,907,580 | 1,952,400 | 1,865,069 | 1,923,822 | 1,916,348 | 1,861,164 | 1,076,425 | 1,746,675 | 1,982,408 | 21,993,297 |
| 2020 | 1,981,132 | 1,854,898 | 1,386,851 | 1,267,605 | 1,965,407 | 1,887,512 | 1,941,500 | 1,925,033 | 1,879,619 | 1,963,043 | 1,910,507 | 1,995,650 | 21,958,757 |
| 2021 | 1,991,790 | 1,680,259 | 1,600,163 | 1,269,956 | 1,955,134 | 1,730,291 | 1,933,495 | 1,927,320 | 1,879,819 | 1,211,341 | 1,688,551 | 1,986,885 | 20,855,004 |
| 2022 | 1,996,621 | 1,804,682 | 1,990,353 | 1,908,367 | 1,953,488 | 1,870,425 | 1,924,485 | 1,927,102 | 1,859,877 | 1,164,373 | 1,533,211 | 1,986,901 | 21,919,885 |
| 2023 | 1,981,393 | 1,794,205 | 1,496,119 | 1,181,761 | 1,941,365 | 1,862,343 | 1,911,690 | 1,904,511 | 1,853,615 | 1,953,564 | 1,917,848 | 1,988,730 | 21,787,144 |
| 2024 | 1,634,136 | 1,833,846 | 1,517,587 | 913,191 | 1,292,316 | 1,802,590 | 1,651,534 | 1,855,827 | 1,856,921 | 1,073,194 | 1,511,616 | 1,983,705 | 18,926,463 |
| 2025 | 1,991,656 | 1,785,799 | 1,972,669 | 1,882,851 | 1,946,961 | 1,882,350 | 1,936,186 | 1,926,075 | 1,875,692 | 1,055,129 | 1,535,515 | 1,991,243 | 21,782,126 |
| 2026 | 1,992,167 | 1,798,528 | 1,523,801 | 1,124,932 | 1,955,615 | 1,532,076 | 1,923,266 | 1,918,004 | | | | | -- |

== 1985 whistleblowing case ==
Nuclear whistleblower Ronald J. Goldstein was a supervisor employed by EBASCO, which was a major contractor for the construction of the South Texas plants. In the summer of 1985, Goldstein identified safety problems to SAFETEAM, an internal compliance program established by EBASCO and Houston Lighting, including noncompliance with safety procedures, the failure to issue safety compliance reports, and quality control violations affecting the safety of the plant.

SAFETEAM was promoted as an independent safe haven for employees to voice their safety concerns. The two companies did not inform their employees that they did not believe complaints reported to SAFETEAM had any legal protection. After he filed his report to SAFETEAM, Goldstein was fired. Subsequently, Goldstein filed suit under federal nuclear whistleblower statutes.

The U.S. Department of Labor ruled that his submissions to SAFETEAM were protected and his dismissal was invalid, a finding upheld by Labor Secretary Lynn Martin. The ruling was appealed and overturned by the Fifth Circuit Court of Appeals, which ruled that private programs offered no protection to whistleblowers. After Goldstein lost his case, Congress amended the federal nuclear whistleblower law to provide protection for reports made to internal systems and prevent retaliation against whistleblowers.

== Ownership ==
The STPEGS reactors are operated by the STP Nuclear Operating Company (STPNOC). Ownership is divided among Constellation Energy at 44 percent, San Antonio municipal utility CPS Energy at 40 percent and Austin Energy at 16 percent.

== Surrounding population ==
The Nuclear Regulatory Commission defines two emergency planning zones around nuclear power plants: a plume exposure pathway zone with a radius of 10 miles (16 km), concerned primarily with exposure to, and inhalation of, airborne radioactive contamination, and an ingestion pathway zone of about 50 miles (80 km), concerned primarily with ingestion of food and liquid contaminated by radioactivity.

In 2010, the population within 50 miles (80 km) of the station was 254,049, an increase of 10.2 percent since 2000; the population within 10 miles (16 km) was 5,651, a 2.4 percent decrease. Cities within 50 miles include Lake Jackson (40 miles to the city center) and Bay City.

== Seismic risk ==
The Nuclear Regulatory Commission's estimate of the risk each year of an earthquake intense enough to cause core damage to the reactor at South Texas was 1 in 158,730, according to an NRC study published in August 2010.

== Reactor data ==
The South Texas Generating Station consists of two operational reactors. A two reactor expansion (Unit 3 and Unit 4) was planned but later cancelled.

| Reactor unit | Reactor plant type | Capacity (MW) | | Construction started | Electricity grid connection | Commercial operation | Current license expiration |
| Reactor unit | Reactor plant type | Net | Gross | Construction started | Electricity grid connection | Commercial operation | Current license expiration |
|---|---|---|---|---|---|---|---|
| South Texas-1 | Westinghouse 4-loop PWR | 1280 | 1354 | 22 December 1975 | 30 March 1988 | 25 August 1988 | 20 August 2047 |
| South Texas-2 | Westinghouse 4-loop PWR | 1280 | 1354 | 22 December 1975 | 11 April 1989 | 19 June 1989 | 15 December 2048 |
| South Texas-3 (cancelled) | ABWR | 1350 | 1400 | License terminated (2018) | | | |
| South Texas-4 (cancelled) | ABWR | 1350 | 1400 | License terminated (2018) | | | |

== See also ==
- List of largest power stations in the United States
- Largest nuclear power plants in the United States
- List of power stations in Texas

== Sources ==
- "Milestones". South Texas Project Nuclear Operating Company. Retrieved Jul. 14, 2005.
- "CenterPoint Energy Historical Timeline". CenterPoint Energy. Retrieved Jul. 14, 2005.
