= Shimane Nuclear Power Plant =

Nuclear power plant in Matsue, Japan

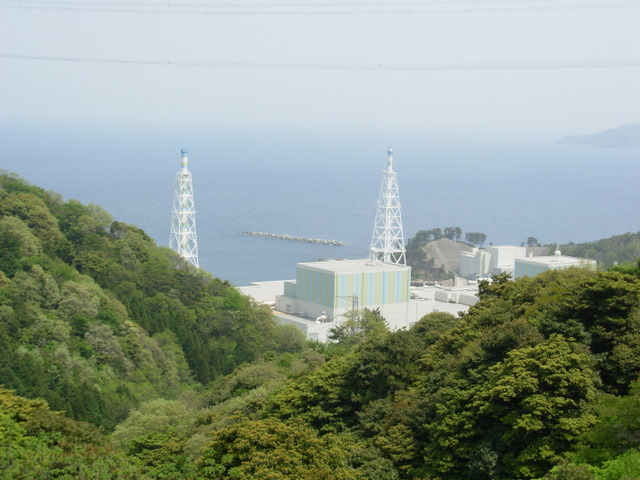
- Shimane NPP
- Country: Japan
- Coordinates: 35°32′18″N 132°59′57″E
- Status: Suspended, pending reactivation as of 2023
- Construction began: July 2, 1970
- Commission date: March 29, 1974
- Operator: Chugoku Electric Power Company

Nuclear power station
- Reactor type: BWR
- Cooling source: Sea of Japan

Power generation
- Units operational: 1 x 820 MW
- Units under const.: 1 × 1,373 MW
- Units decommissioned: 1 x 460 MW
- Nameplate capacity: 820 MW
- Capacity factor: 0
- Annual net output: 0 GW·h

External links
- Website: www.energia.co.jp/atom/shimane_menu.html
- Commons: Related media on Commons

The Shimane Nuclear Power Plant (島根原子力発電所, Shimane genshiryoku hatsudensho; Shimane NPP) is a nuclear power plant located in Kashima in the city of Matsue in Shimane Prefecture. It is owned and operated by Chūgoku Electric Power Company.

The plant was once said to be the closest nuclear power plant to a prefecture capital. However, on 31 March 2005, the area of Kashima merged with Matsue, making it part of the prefecture capital.

New Scientist magazine has reported that, in June 2006, a previously unknown geological fault was identified close to the plant, but it was expected to be years before the plant was strengthened.

The power plant covers an area of 1.92 square kilometres (470 acres).

== Reactors on site ==
Name	Reactor type	Commission date	Power rating	Comments
Shimane-1	BWR	29 March 1974	460 MW	To be decommissioned
Shimane-2	BWR	10 February 1989	820 MW	Restarted on 7 December 2024
Shimane-3	ABWR	Under construction	1373 MW	Commissioning due in March 2012, but construction suspended in 2011. METI approved the restart of construction in September 2012.

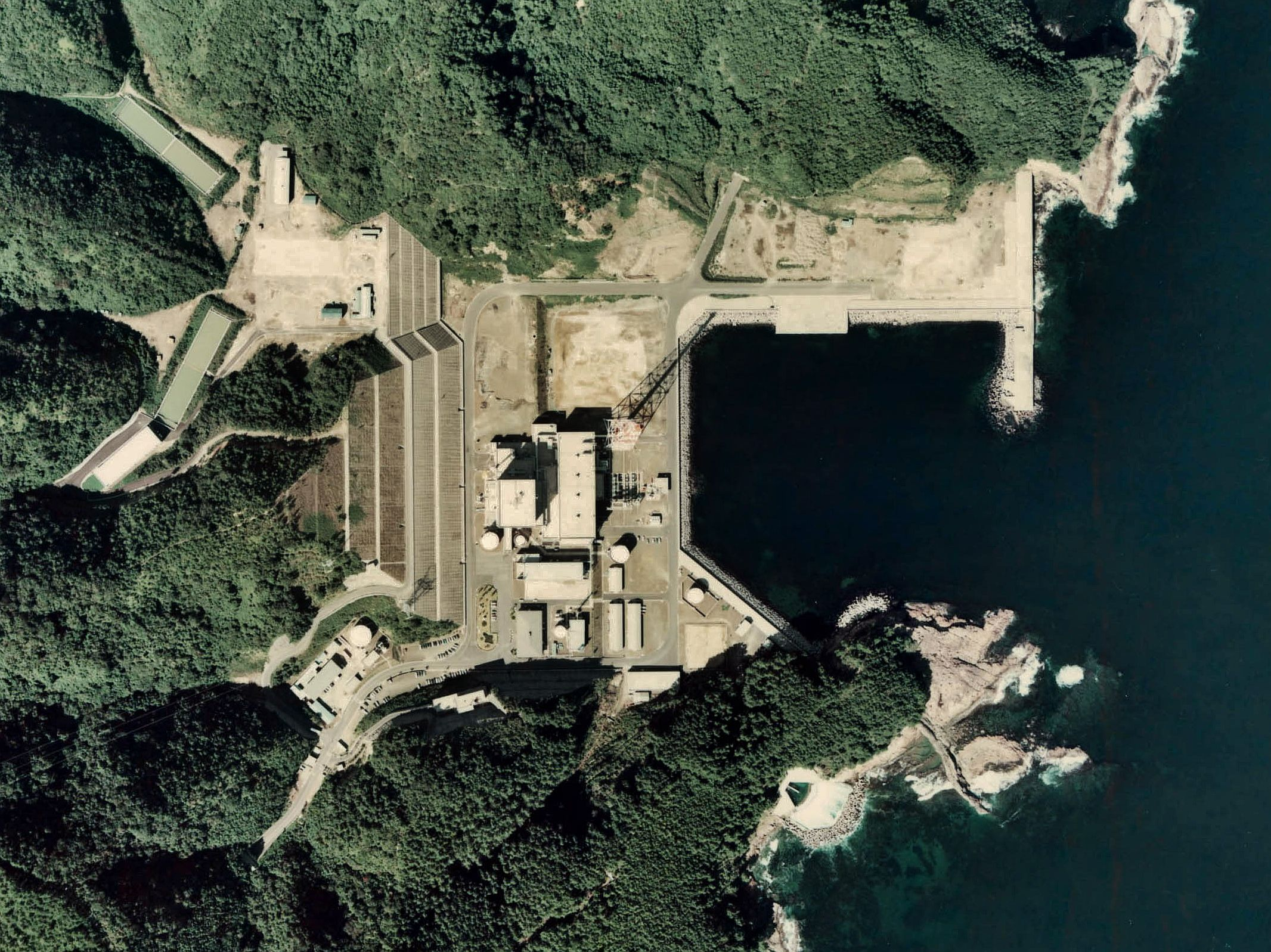
Aerial view, 1976, image: Ministry of Land, Infrastructure, Transport and Tourism of Japan

== See also ==
- List of nuclear power plants in Japan
