= Kashiwazaki-Kariwa Nuclear Power Plant =

Nuclear power plant in Niigata Prefecture, Japan

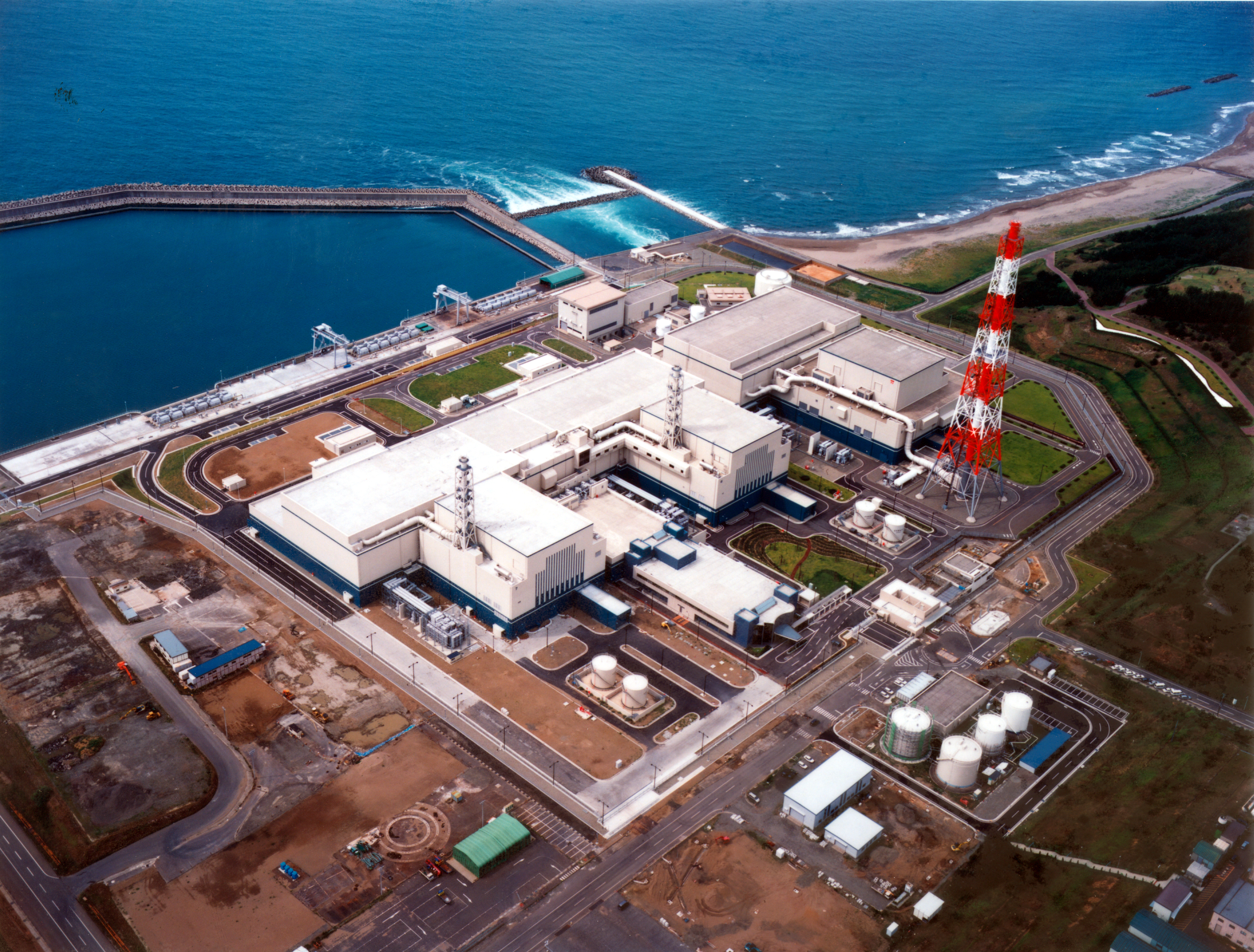
- Aerial view, units 5, 6, and 7
- Country: Japan
- Location: Kashiwazaki-Kariwa region
- Coordinates: 37°25′42″N 138°36′06″E
- Status: Operational (Only Unit 6 is online, all other units offline)
- Construction began: June 5, 1980
- Commission date: September 18, 1985
- Owner: TEPCO
- Operator: Tokyo Electric Power Company
- Cooling source: Sea of Japan

Power generation
- Units operational: 5 × 1,067 MW; 2 × 1,315 MW
- Nameplate capacity: 7,965 MW
- Capacity factor: 0%
- Annual net output: 0 GW·h

External links
- Website: www.tepco.co.jp/nu/kk-np/index-j.html
- Commons: Related media on Commons

The Kashiwazaki-Kariwa Nuclear Power Plant (柏崎刈羽原子力発電所, Kashiwazaki-Kariwa genshiryoku-hatsudensho; Kashiwazaki-Kariwa NPP) is a large nuclear power plant on a 4.2-square-kilometer (1,000-acre) site spanning the towns of Kashiwazaki and Kariwa in Niigata Prefecture, Japan, on the coast of the Sea of Japan. It is the first nuclear power plant in the world to use an advanced boiling water reactor. The plant is owned and operated by Tokyo Electric Power Company (TEPCO), and it is the largest nuclear generating station in the world by net electrical power rating.

On 16 July 2007, the Chūetsu offshore earthquake took place, with its epicenter located only 19 km (12 mi) from the plant. The earthquake registered M_{w} 6.6, ranking it among the strongest earthquakes to occur in the immediate range of a nuclear power plant. This shook the plant beyond design basis and initiated an extended shutdown for inspection, which indicated that greater earthquake-proofing was needed before the operation could be resumed. The plant was completely shut down for 21 months following the earthquake. Unit 7 was restarted after seismic upgrades on 19 May 2009, followed later by units 1, 5, and 6. (Units 2, 3, and 4 were not restarted by the time of the March 2011 earthquake.)

The four restarted and operating units at the plant were not affected by the 11 March 2011 earthquake, but thereupon all units were shut down to carry out safety improvements. TEPCO regained permission to restart units 6 and 7 from the Nuclear Regulation Authority (NRA) in 2017. In December 2023, the NRA approved the reloading of fuel at the plant, citing improvements in the safety management system. TEPCO first restarted Unit 6 in January 2026 only to take it offline twice due to an alarm and later a repairs, and was subsequently restarted, entering commercial operations on 16 April 2026.

== Reactors ==
There are seven reactor units spread across the campus coast line. Numbering starts with the southern-most unit, Unit 1, then north through Unit 4. There is a large green space between Unit 4 and Unit 7. Number continues northward with Unit 7, Unit 6, and Unit 5.

Reactor attributes
	KK – 1	KK – 2	KK – 3	KK – 4	KK – 5	KK – 6	KK – 7
Reactor Type	Boiling Water	Boiling Water	Boiling Water	Boiling Water	Boiling Water	Advanced Boiling Water	Advanced Boiling Water
Net Power (MW)	1,067	1,067	1,067	1,067	1,067	1,315	1,315
Gross Power (MW)	1,100	1,100	1,100	1,100	1,100	1,356	1,356
Start of Construction	5 June 1980	18 November 1985	7 March 1989	5 March 1990	20 June 1985	3 November 1992	1 July 1993
First Criticality	12 December 1984	30 November 1989	19 October 1992	1 November 1993	20 July 1989	18 December 1995	1 November 1996
Commission date	18 September 1985	28 September 1990	11 August 1993	11 August 1994	10 April 1990	7 November 1996	2 July 1997
Installation Costs (1,000 yen/kW)	330	360	310	310	420	310	280
Reactor/NSSS Supplier	Toshiba	Toshiba	Toshiba	Hitachi	Hitachi	Hitachi/ Toshiba/GE	Hitachi/ Toshiba/GE
Status	Offline	Offline	Offline	Offline	Offline	Online	Offline

The power installation costs for units at this site well reflect the general trend in costs of nuclear plants. Capital costs increased through the 1980s but have become cheaper in modern times. The last two units were the first Advanced Boiling Water Reactors (ABWRs) ever built.

=== Performance ===
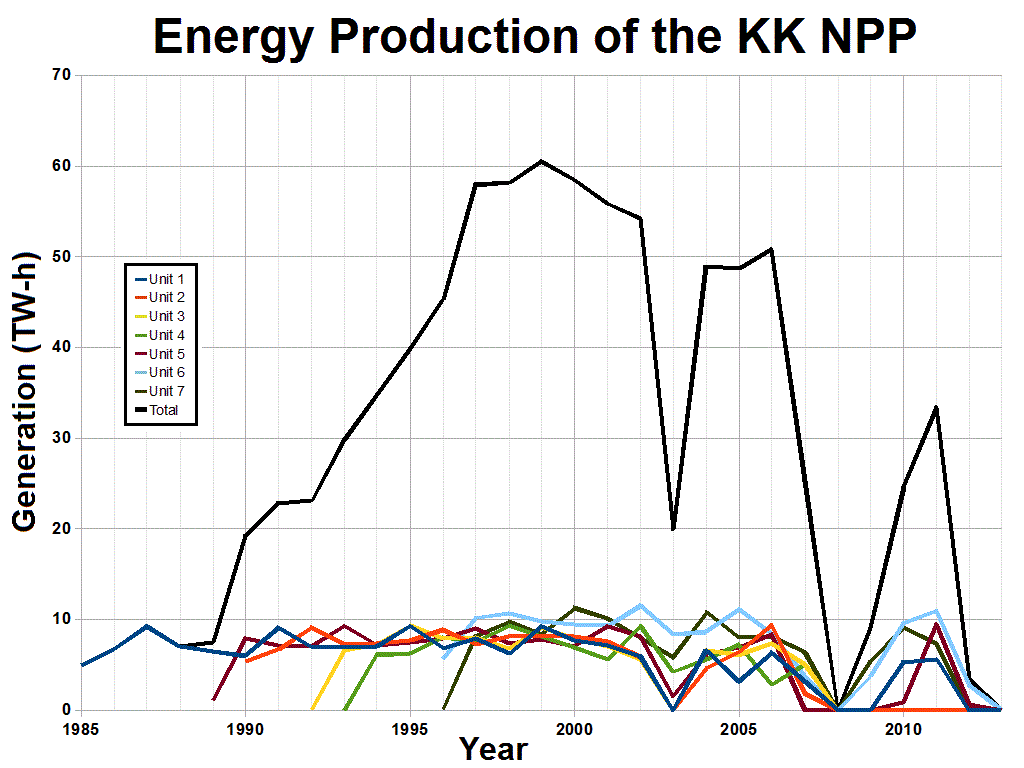
Despite frequent changes in performance year to year due to routine outages, the entire plant operated at almost continuous power output until the plant-wide events of the 2000s.

Operating a single large plant comprising this many reactors has several economic advantages. One such benefit is the limited impact of single-reactor refueling outages during the replacement cycle; one dormant reactor makes minimal impact on the plant's net power production. A smooth transition was seen in the power production history of the plant up through the time the last two units were built. Currently, however, there are no active reactors at the Kashiwazaki-Kariwa plant. TEPCO has outlined plans to restart Reactor 6 and Reactor 7 and is awaiting approval from the government and citizens before the reactors are permitted to restart.

Generation by unit and total (TWh)
Year	Unit 1	Unit 2	Unit 3	Unit 4	Unit 5	Unit 6	Unit 7	Total
1985	4.960							4.960
1986	6.704							6.704
1987	9.195							9.195
1988	6.960							6.960
1989	6.442				1.041			7.484
1990	5.987	5.386			7.911			19.284
1991	9.032	6.642			7.093			22.767
1992	6.958	9.047	0.053		6.977			23.035
1993	6.874	7.213	6.488	0.012	9.238			29.825
1994	7.020	7.291	7.264	6.040	7.155			34.771
1995	9.235	7.697	9.254	6.182	7.508			39.877
1996	6.814	8.811	7.922	8.068	7.906	5.663	0.058	45.242
1997	7.900	7.284	8.016	7.517	8.919	10.161	8.128	57.926
1998	6.176	8.142	6.748	9.259	7.353	10.702	9.716	58.095
1999	9.199	8.209	9.028	8.142	7.772	9.710	8.445	60.505
2000	7.715	8.140	7.945	6.919	7.043	9.412	11.240	58.413
2001	7.071	7.595	6.986	5.591	9.199	9.270	10.078	55.790
2002	5.906	5.866	5.576	9.240	8.191	11.504	7.990	54.273
2003	0.000	0.000	0.000	4.186	1.503	8.401	5.778	19.869
2004	6.497	4.660	6.550	5.624	6.135	8.635	10.805	48.906
2005	3.126	6.388	6.062	7.192	6.853	11.126	7.977	48.725
2006	6.299	9.331	7.331	2.817	8.400	8.447	8.166	50.792
2007	3.165	1.830	5.054	5.061	0.0	3.758	6.358	25.226
2008	0.0	0.0	0.0	0.0	0.0	0.0	0.0	0.0
2009	0.0	0.0	0.0	0.0	0.0	3.654	5.366	9.02
2010	5.291	0.0	0.0	0.0	0.780	9.522	9.034	24.627
2011	5.606	0.0	0.0	0.0	9.402	10.960	7.349	33.317
2012	0.0	0.0	0.0	0.0	0.0	0.0	0.0	0.0
2013	0.0	0.0	0.0	0.0	0.0	0.0	0.0	0.0
2014	0.0	0.0	0.0	0.0	0.0	0.0	0.0	0.0
2015	0.0	0.0	0.0	0.0	0.0	0.0	0.0	0.0
2016	0.0	0.0	0.0	0.0	0.0	0.0	0.0	0.0
2017	0.0	0.0	0.0	0.0	0.0	0.0	0.0	0.0
2018	0.0	0.0	0.0	0.0	0.0	0.0	0.0	0.0
2019	0.0	0.0	0.0	0.0	0.0	0.0	0.0	0.0
2020	0.0	0.0	0.0	0.0	0.0	0.0	0.0	0.0
2021	0.0	0.0	0.0	0.0	0.0	0.0	0.0	0.0

=== Partial shutdowns ===
In February 1991, Unit 2 was automatically shut down following a sudden drop in oil pressure inside the steam turbine.

On 18 July 1997, radioactive steam leaked from a gauge within Unit 7 of the Kashiwazaki-Kariwa plant. In May, a burst tube had delayed trial runs at the plant, and earlier in July smoke had been found coming from plant machinery.

In January 1998, Unit 1 was shut down after increasing radiation levels in the steam driving the turbine triggered alarms. The levels were reportedly 270 times the expected operating level.

Reactors at the plant were shut down one by one following the 2002 discovery that TEPCO had deliberately falsified data surrounding safety inspections. The first reactor was taken offline 9 September 2002, and the final reactor was taken offline 27 January 2003. The newest units, the more inherently safe ABWRs, were taken back online the quickest and suffered the smallest effect. Units 1, 2, and 3, on the other hand, generated no electricity during the fiscal year of 2003.

=== Complete shutdowns ===
Units 1–4 were completely shut down in 2008. Only Unit 1 was temporarily restarted in 2010–2011. Unit 5 was temporarily restarted between 2010 and 2012 after a shut down in 2007. Following the Fukushima disaster in 2011, Unit 1 was shut down again in 2012 along with units 5–7. As of May 2022, the plant remains idle.

The plant's 6,000 staff continued to work during the long shutdown. TEPCO restarted Unit 6 in January 2026.

== Fuel ==
All reactors continue to use low-enriched uranium as the nuclear fuel; however, there have been plans drafted by TEPCO to use MOX fuel in some of the reactors by the permission of the Japanese Atomic Energy Commission (JAEC). A public referendum in the Kariwa village in 2001 voted 53% against use of the new fuel. After the 2002 TEPCO data fabrication scandals, the president at the time, Nobuya Minami, announced that plans to use the MOX fuel at the KK plant would be suspended indefinitely.

== Earthquakes ==
=== Pre-existing earthquake resistance measures ===
Sand at the sites was removed and the reactor was built on firm ground. Adjacent soil was backfilled. Basements of the reactor buildings extend several levels down (maximum of 42 m below grade). These underground elements stabilize the reactor buildings, making them less likely to suffer sway due to resonance vibrations during an earthquake. As with other Japanese power plants, reactors at the plant were built according to earthquake-resistance standards, which are regulated by law and the JAEC.

In 2006 safety standards for earthquake resistance in Japan's nuclear plants were modified and tightened. After the 2007 earthquake suspicions arose that another fault line may be closer to the plant than originally thought, possibly running straight through the site.

=== 2007 Chūetsu offshore earthquake ===
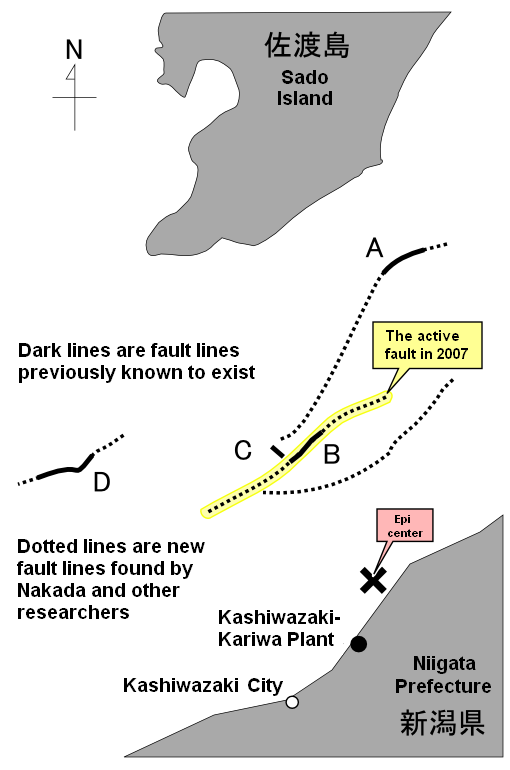
The offshore fault lines near the plant. Some faults were discovered through research after the major earthquake while some were known before.

The KK plant was 19 kilometers away from the epicenter of the magnitude 6.6 2007 Chūetsu offshore earthquake, which took place 10:13 a.m., 16 July 2007. Peak ground acceleration of 6.8 m/s^{2} (0.69 g) was recorded in Unit 1 in the east–west direction, above the design specification for safe shutdown of 4.5 m/s^{2}, and well above the rapid restart specification for key equipment in the plant of 2.73 m/s^{2}. Units 5 and 6 also recorded shaking over this limit. Shaking of 20.58 m/s^{2} was recorded in the turbine building of Unit 3.

Those nearby saw black smoke which was later confirmed to be an electric transformer that had caught fire at Unit 3. The fire was put out by noon on the day of the quake, about 2 hours after it started. The 3-story transformer building was extensively charred.

Reactor units 3, 4, and 7 all automatically powered down safely in response to the quake. Unit 2 was in startup mode and not online. Units 1, 5, and 6 were already shut down for inspection at the time. TEPCO was ready to restart some of the units as of the next day, but the trade ministry ordered the plant to remain idle until additional safety checks could be completed. On Wednesday, 18 July, the mayor of Kashiwazaki ordered operations at the plant to be halted until its safety could be confirmed. The Nikkei reported that government safety checks could delay the restart for over a year, without stating the source of the information. For comparison, in 2005, a reactor at the Onagawa Nuclear Power Plant was closed for five months following an earthquake.

==== IAEA inspections ====
The International Atomic Energy Agency (IAEA) offered to inspect the plant, which was initially declined. The governor of Niigata prefecture then sent a petition to Shinzo Abe. On Sunday, 22 July 2007, the Nuclear and Industrial Safety Agency (NISA) announced that it would allow inspectors from the United Nations to review the damage.

A team from the IAEA carried out a four-day inspection, as investigations by Japan's Nuclear and Industrial Safety Agency (NISA), Nuclear Safety Commission (NSC) and the Tokyo Electric Power Company (TEPCO) continued. The team of the IAEA confirmed that the plant had "shut down safely" and that "damage appears less than expected". On 19 August, the IAEA reported that, for safety-related and nuclear components, "no visible significant damage has been found" although "nonsafety related structures, systems and components were affected by significant damage".

The official report issued by the IAEA stated that the plant "behaved in a safe manner" after a 4-day inspection. Other observations were:

- "Safety related structures, systems and components of the plant seem to be in a general condition, much better than might be expected for such a strong earthquake, and there is no visible significant damage"
- Conservatisms introduced in the construction of the plant compensated for the magnitude of the earthquake being so much greater than planned for.

Recommendations included:

- A re-evaluation of the seismic safety.
- Detailed geophysical investigations

External inspections of the plant were planned to be completed by the end of July 2008. The schedule was confirmed on 10 July 2008 by the site superintendent, Akio Takahashi. On 15 July, Akira Amari said his ministry was also continuing their own tests. An IAEA workshop in June 2008 recognized that the earthquake exceeded the "seismic input" used in the design in that plant, and that regulations played a critical role in keeping the plant safe. However, TEPCO determined that significant upgrades were required to cope with the improved understanding of the seismic environment and possible shaking effects at the plant site.

The IAEA sent a team for a follow-up visit in January 2008. They concluded that much high-quality inspection work had been undertaken and noted the likely improvements to nuclear seismic design worldwide that may result from this process. An additional visit from an IAEA team of 10 experts occurred in December 2008, noting that the "unexpectedly large ground motions" were now well understood and could be protected against, and further confirming the safe performance of the plant during the quake.

==== Radioactivity releases ====
Initially, it was thought that some water (estimated to be about 1.5 L) from the spent fuel pool leaked into the Sea of Japan as a result of the quake. Later, more detailed reports confirmed a number of releases, though most of them were far less active than common natural radiation sources. According to the NISA, this was the first time a release of radioactive material happened as a result of an earthquake.

- 0.6 litres of slightly radioactive water leaked from the third floor of the Unit 6 reactor building, which contained 280 becquerels of radioactivity. (For reference, a household smoke detector typically contains 37,000 becquerels (1.0 μCi) of radioactivity, and a living adult human typically has around 8000 Bq of naturally occurring radioactivity inside their body).
- 0.9 litres of slightly radioactive water leaked from the inner third floor of the Unit 6 reactor building, containing 16,000 Bq of radioactivity.
- From unit 6, 1.3 cubic meters of water from the spent fuel pool leaked through a drainage pipe and ultimately into the Sea of Japan. The water contained 80 Bq/L, totaling 90,000 Bq in the release. For comparison, an Onsen located in Misasa, Tottori, Japan uses water with a large concentration of radon, which gives it a radioactivity of 9300 Bq/L. The leaked water from the plant did not pose a health risk even before being diluted. Towels were used to mop up the water.
- On Wednesday, 18 July 2007, at Unit 7, radioactive iodine was found leaking from an exhaust pipe by a government inspector, the leak began between Tuesday and Wednesday and was confirmed to have stopped by Thursday night. The amount of iodine released was estimated at 12 million Bq and the total amount of particulate radioactivity released into the air was about 402,000,000 Bq. This was said to have been one 10 millionth of the legal limit. It is estimated that this caused an unintentional dose of 0.0002 nanosieverts (nSv), per person distributed among around 10 million people. The limit for dose to the public from the operations of a nuclear plant in Japan in one year is 1100 nSv, and, for comparison, natural background radiation worldwide for humans is on average around 2,400,000 nSv/year (2.4 mSv/year). In regards to the cause, Yasuhisa Shiozaki said "This is an error of not implementing the manual," because the vent should have been closed.

==== Other problems ====
About 400 drums containing low-level nuclear waste stored at the plant were knocked over by the aftershocks, 40 losing their lids. Company officials reported on 17 July that traces of the radioactive materials cobalt-60, iodine, and chromium-51 had been released into the atmosphere, presumably from the containers losing their lids.

Criticisms of the company's response to the event included the time it took the company to report events and the certainty with which they were able to locate the source of various problems. TEPCO's president made a comment the site was a "mess" after visiting post-quake. While the reported amount of leaked radioactivity remained far below what poses a danger to the public, details changed multiple times in the few days after the quake and attracted significant media attention. After the quake, TEPCO was supposedly investigating 50 separate cases of "malfunctioning and trouble", a number that was changed to 63 cases later. Even the radioactivity sensors around the site encountered trouble, the reading from these devices are normally available online, giving the public a direct measure of ambient radioactivity around the site, but due to damage sustained during the earthquake, stopped reporting on the website. The company published an apology on that page, and data from the devices covering the off-line period was released later, showing no artificial abnormalities (note that the readings naturally fluctuate depending on whether it's raining or snowing and a host of other factors).

TEPCO's president maintained that fears of a leak of radioactive material were unfounded (since the amount leaked into the ocean was a billionth of the legal limit), but many international reporters expressed distrust of the company that has a history of cover-up controversies. The IAEA's Mohamed ElBaradei encouraged full transparency throughout the investigation of the accident so that lessons learned could be applied to nuclear plants elsewhere.

==== Impact ====
News of the earthquake, combined with the fact that replacement power sources (such as oil and gas) are at record highs, caused TEPCOs stock to plummet 7.5%, the largest drop in seven years, which amounted to around US$4.4 billion lost in stock capitalization. This made the event even more costly to the company than the 2002 data falsification scandal. Additionally, TEPCO warned that the plant closure could cause a power shortage during the summer months. Trade minister Akira Amari requested that business users cut electricity use, and in August TEPCO was forced to reduce electricity supplies for industrial uses, the first time it had to resort to such measures in 17 years.

Reports of the leak caused thousands of cancellations at resorts and hotels along the Sea of Japan coast, even as far as Murakami, Niigata (140 km northeast) and Sado Island. Inn owners have said that rumors have been more damaging than direct effects of the earthquake.

The shutdown forced TEPCO to run natural gas plants in place of this plant, not only increasing Japan's demand for the fuel and increasing the price internationally, but also increasing carbon dioxide output such that Japan will have difficulty meeting the Kyoto Protocol.

==== Restart ====
After 16 months of comprehensive component-based assessment and upgrades on all seven reactors, this phase of post-earthquake response was almost complete, with Reactor 7 fully upgraded to cope with the seismic environment. On 8 November 2008, fuel loading in reactor Unit 7 started, preparatory to a period of system safety tests on that reactor. On 19 February 2009 TEPCO applied to the local governance to restart Unit 7 after having obtained approval from the national government and regulators. Local government agreement for restart was granted in May and electrical grid power was supplied from Unit 7 at 20% power on 19 May. The reactor was raised to 100% power on 5 June 2009 as part of a series of restart tests.

Unit 6 restarted on 26 August 2009 and reconnected to the grid on 31 August.

Unit 1 restarted on 31 May 2010 after loading with fuel (along with Unit 5) earlier in the year, and was generating grid power by 6 June 2010.

Unit 5 recommenced grid generation on 26 November 2010, in the same week that fuel loading for Unit 3 started.

Units 2, 3, and 4 were not restarted.

=== 2011 Tōhoku earthquake and Fukushima I nuclear accident ===
The reactors were shut down indefinitely following the 2011 Tōhoku earthquake and tsunami and the ensuing Fukushima Daiichi nuclear disaster. Plans to restart units 6 and 7 were delayed after problems developed with the intruder detection system. On 21 April, TEPCO announced a plan to build up the seawall to a height of 15 m (49.2 ft) above sea level and spanning more than 800 m (2,624 ft) in length for units 1–4, and more than 500 m (1,640 ft) for units 5–7 by June 2013. The height of a potential tsunami was assumed to be 3.3 m. Also, plans were made to rebuild the radioactive overflow storage pool to be completed by September 2012.

=== 2011–2012: Survey on tsunamis in the past ===
On 10 November 2011, TEPCO announced a survey for signs of past tsunamis in this area. With drills, soil samples were to be taken of sediment layers dating from the year 1600 back to 7000 years ago, at nine locations around the plant at the coast of central Japan. This survey, the first that TEPCO ever conducted on this subject, did start on 15 November 2011, and was planned to be completed in April 2012, and was done to examine the possibility of higher tsunamis than had been expected at the time the plant was designed and built.

On 26 April 2012, TEPCO said that it would recalculate the risks of earthquakes and tsunamis. This was done after reports, as published by four prefectures around the nuclear Plant, re-estimated the risks of potential earthquakes in the region:

- Tottori Prefecture: a 220 kilometer long fault might trigger an 8.15 magnitude earthquake
- Shimane Prefecture: 8.01 magnitude
- Ishikawa Prefecture: 7.99 magnitude

The calculated earthquake magnitudes are almost three times stronger than all the calculations done by TEPCO regarding the safety assessments for the plant. These were based on a magnitude 7.85 quake caused by a 131 kilometer long fault near Sado Island in Niigata and a 3.3 meter-high tsunami. To endure this, an embankment was under construction to resist tsunami waves up to 15 meters high. The recalculation could have consequences for the stress tests and safety assessments for the plant.

After the planned revision of the safety standards in July 2013, some faults under the reactors were considered as geologically active. This was found by Japanese news agency Kyodo News on 23 January 2013 in papers and other material published by TEPCO. Under the new regulations, geologic faults would be considered to be active if they had moved within the last 400,000 years, instead of the less stringent standard of 120 000 years, as was formerly accepted.

Two faults, named "Alpha" and "Beta," are present under Reactors 1 and 2. Other faults are situated under Reactor 3 and Reactor 5, as well as underneath the building of Reactor 4. Under the new regulations, the beta-fault could be classified as active because it moved a ground layer including volcanic ash around 240,000 years ago. The outcome of the study might trigger a second survey by the newly installed Japanese regulator NRA. In January 2013, studies were conducted or planned on geological faults around six Japanese reactor sites. The Kashiwazaki-Kariwa plant would be number seven.

== Current status ==
=== TEPCO security lapses ===
In 2017, TEPCO contemplated a restart of the plant from 2019 to 2021.

Kashiwazaki-Kariwa is one of the 44 nuclear power plants in Japan that have been rendered inactive in the years following the Fukushima Daiichi Accident. By October 2020, the Japanese government had inspected the plant, and by January 2020, TEPCO had completed its improvements on Unit 7. The company outlined plans to restart the reactor as early as the end of the Japanese 2022 fiscal year (31 March 2022). However, the Nuclear Regulation Authority released a report in April 2021 indicating that there were serious security infractions and enacted an order that postponed the restart indefinitely.

Following the April 2021 NRA report, TEPCO admitted that its intruder detection system was left broken in order to reduce costs and confirmed that an unauthorized personnel member used a colleague's ID card to access the plant's central control room in September 2020. In response, TEPCO plans to implement anti-terrorism measures, install an intrusion detection system, and hire an additional 30 guards to protect nuclear material at the facility. The power company intends to invest ¥20 Billion (US$165.4 million) on these security measures from 31 March 2023 to 31 March 2028.

According to a report from TEPCO, the NRA began Additional Inspection (Phase II) to monitor the new security measures at the plant. In April 2022, it was confirmed that the security flaws revealed in the NRA's April 2022 report were limited to Kashiwazaki-Kariwa and not indicative of a widespread issue throughout the company's culture. TEPCO is planning on moving nearly 40% of their nuclear division employees to Niigata Prefecture in preparation of its plans to restart Reactor 7 and begin rebuilding trust in the citizens, but the future of Kashiwazaki-Kariwa is still uncertain. As of 26 May 2022, the local government has yet to move forward with approval for TEPCO to set forth their plans to restart. According to a 2021 survey by Niigata Nippo, just over half of Niigata prefecture residents oppose a nuclear restart.

=== Regulatory approvals and delays for Kashiwazaki-Kariwa Units 7 restart ===
In October 2022, Japanese Prime Minister Kishida Fumio unveiled a new strategy for Japan's nuclear power plants regarding new construction projects and license extensions. Included in this strategy, is a plan to restart units at the Kashiwazaki-Kariwa Nuclear Power Plant by the summer months of 2023. Although, the feasibility of this timelime have been questioned by journalists given the number of safety issues that have come to light at the plant in the last few years. Most of these issues relate to security discrepancies such as a worker who forgot his ID, borrowed his colleagues card to enter crucial areas. A government inspection of Unit 7 in October 2020 concluded that the majority of construction had been finished by January the following year. TEPCO felt that it is doing everything in its power to meet NRA guidelines.

In late 2023, the national regulator lifted the operational ban on the plant, allowing it to begin applying for permits from local governments to reopen.

On Monday, 8 April 2024, Japan's Nuclear Regulation Authority approved plans submitted by TEPCO to fuel reactor No. 7. TEPCO announced it would begin fueling reactor 7 starting around 4pm on 14 April, a process which typically takes about two weeks. Operation of reactor 7 would still require completion of additional inspections and would require the approval of the Niigate Prefecture Governor. It was reported that Reactor 7 is scheduled to restart operation in October 2024 "under a base-case scenario". However, as of Feb 2025, due to the delay in completion of anti-terrorist measures at the site, the plant is scheduled to resume operations in 2029.

=== 2025 authorization to resume operations ===
In December 2025 the Niigata prefecture assembly voted on the restarting of reactors 6 and 7.

On 22 December 2025, Japan approved Tokyo Electric Power Company (TEPCO) to restart the Kashiwazaki-Kariwa nuclear site as the world's largest nuclear power plant.

Reactor number 6 was restarted on 21 January 2026. Within hours it was paused during the resumption of operation, after an alarm was triggered. Investigations commenced.

Reactor number 6 has been restarted on 9 February 2026. TEPCO stated that they will continue to slowly increase the pressure in the reactor and start power generation and transmission on 16 February, after which they will halt generation on 20 February to inspect the reactor and following equipment for abnormalities. Full commercial operation is said to start 18 March after inspections pass.

== See also ==
- Katsuhiko Ishibashi
- Pacific Ring of Fire
- List of nuclear power plants in Japan
