= Shika Nuclear Power Plant =

Nuclear power plant in Japan

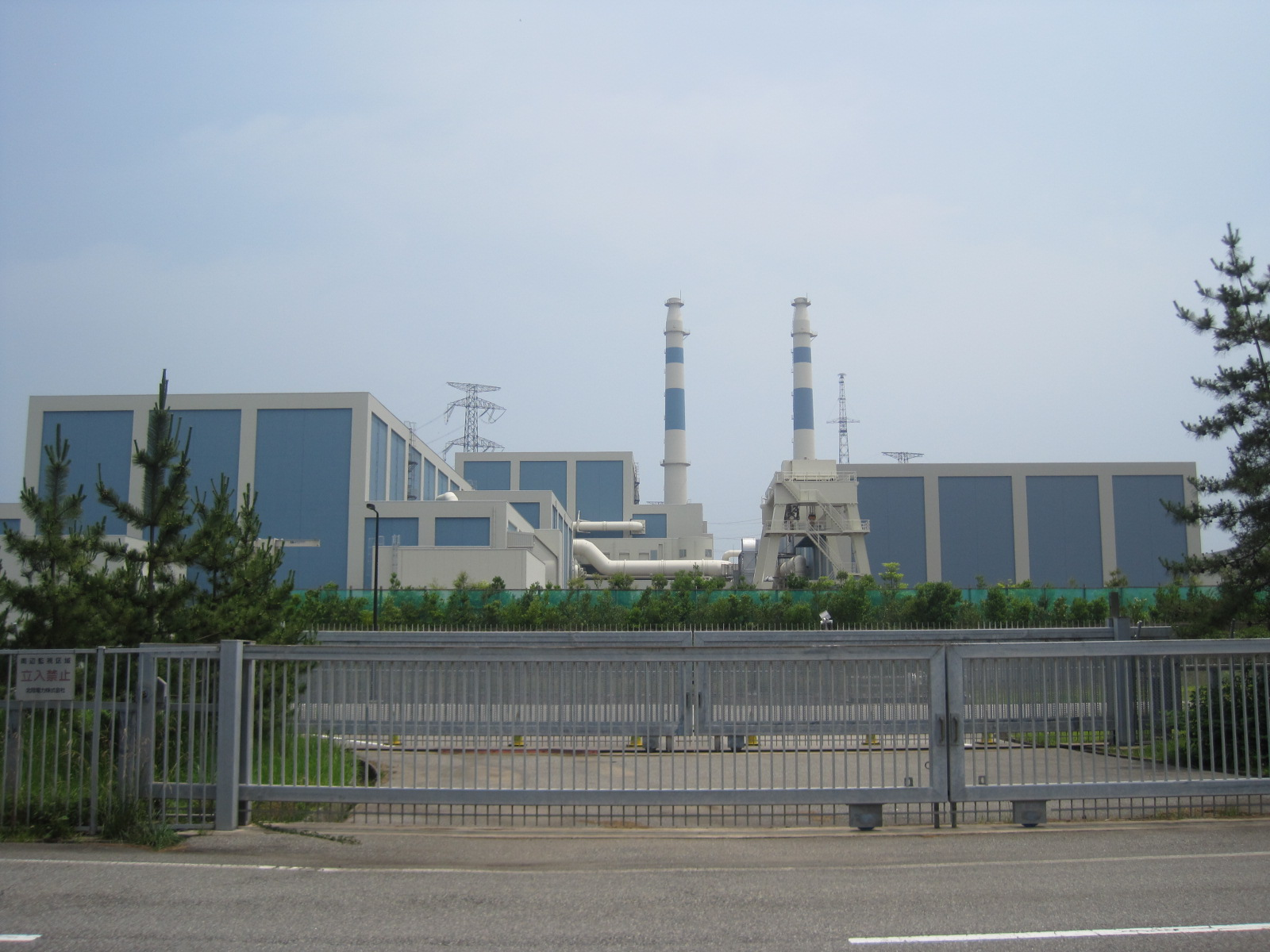
- Country: Japan
- Coordinates: 37°03′40″N 136°43′35″E
- Status: Out of service
- Construction began: July 1, 1989
- Commission date: July 30, 1993
- Operator: Hokuriku Electric Power Company

Nuclear power station
- Reactor type: 1 x BWR; 1 x ABWR
- Cooling source: Sea of Japan

Power generation
- Units operational: 1 x 540 MW; 1 x 1206 MW
- Nameplate capacity: 1746 MW
- Capacity factor: 0
- Annual net output: 0 GW·h

External links
- Website: www.rikuden.co.jp/atomic/
- Commons: Related media on Commons

The Shika Nuclear Power Plant (志賀原子力発電所, Shika genshiryoku hatsudensho; Shika NPP) is a nuclear power plant located in the town of Shika, Ishikawa, Japan. It is owned and operated by the Hokuriku Electric Power Company. It consists of two units with a total capacity of 1.746 GW on a site that is 1.6 km^{2} (395 acres). Both units were put in a temporary shutdown in the wake of the 2011 Fukushima Daiichi nuclear disaster and received safety upgrades to comply with stricter regulatory requirements. As of 2023, Hokuriku aims to restart the plant in 2026.

The Hokuriku Technology Museum on nuclear power is located next to the plant site.

== History ==
=== Construction ===
Construction of the first unit was started on July 1, 1989, and finished in three years. The reactor reached its first criticality on November 20, 1992, and went into commercial operation on July 30, 1993. Construction of the second unit was started on August 20, 2001, and finished in three years. The reactor reached its first criticality on May 26, 2005, and went into commercial operation on March 15, 2006. Both units used boiling water reactors from Hitachi.

=== Operation ===
Unit 1 supplied an average of 3600 GWh of electricity to the grid yearly during the first ten years of operation with a peak production of 4432 GWh in 1997.

=== The 1999 incident and cover-up ===
On June 18, 1999, during an inspection, an emergency control rod insertion was to be performed on Unit 1. One rod was to be inserted into the reactor, however, three control rods fell by accident. For the next 15 minutes, the reactor was in a critical state, an unintended self-sustaining nuclear fission chain reaction. This incident was covered up by the operator, and was not revealed until March 15, 2007.

Unit 1 was subsequently shut down from March 2007 to March 2009, during judicial and bureaucratic evaluation. In April 2007 the event had been provisionally categorized as an INES level-2 incident. A lower court had ordered the entire plant to be shut down, but that decision was later overturned by Nagoya's high court. The utility put in a request to the Ishikawa prefectural government and the town of Shika for the restart of unit 1. The unit returned to power on May 11, 2009, and resumed commercial operation on May 13.

Unit 2 reached a peak yearly electricity production of 9279 GWh in 2010.

=== Temporary shutdown ===
Following the 2011 Fukushima nuclear accident, the plant was temporarily shut down in March 2011 to make changes in order to comply with new regulatory requirements.

Construction of a reinforced concrete wall that should shield the reactors against a possible tsunami was started in October 2011. The wall was designed 4 meters high and 700 meters long, 11 meters above sea level. This was done to comply with extra governmental instructions ordered after the Fukushima accident. Next to this a new drainage gate was installed to minimize damage to plant facilities in case seawater would be able to climb over the wall and would submerge the plant. Other emergency safety measures included the installing of an extra pump to cool the reactors with seawater and an extra power source to operate a valve for venting steam out of reactors. Construction was expected to be completed by the end of March 2013.

After finishing the safety upgrades, permission for the restart of unit 2 from the Nuclear Regulation Authority (NRA) was first sought in August 2014. The NRA safety review was however delayed considerably over the determination of whether there are active geological faults underneath the site, which lasted until March 2023, when it was concluded that there are no such faults. Following these results, Hokuriku Electric submitted an application with a plan to restart unit 2 in early 2026. Unit 1 is to follow soon afterwards. Earlier, the NRA had reached a unanimous decision not to seek further opinion from experts who raised concerns of the faults being active.

=== 2024 Noto earthquake ===
In January 2024 the plant was closest to a magnitude 7.6 earthquake in Ishikawa Prefecture, and survived the event with no major damage. Some water from a spent fuel pool spilled over during the earthquake.

Following the Noto earthquake, the operator said the cooling pool water level "has not changed significantly" after the spillage of more than 400 litres at Units 1 and 2, and that it "did not impact radiation levels outside".

The plant's transformers were also damaged by the quake, leaving it "unable to receive electricity from outside".

On 10 January, a second oil leak "in several gutters surrounding the main transformer of the No. 2 reactor" was reported, as well a second "oil slick measuring about 100 meters by 30 meters" on the sea in front of the power plant. "In addition to the loss of the two external power sources [...] some 23,400 litres of oil leaked when transformers for both the No. 1 and 2 reactors were damaged," the Mainichi reported. Following the incident, the plant's former construction site manager has claimed the plant should be decommissioned.

On 17 April, NHK reported that a section of the No. 1 reactor control system had been dislodged by the quake, and that the Nuclear Regulation Authority chairperson instructed the operator for constructural improvements.

Evacuation plans have since been questioned, with the majority of the Ishikawa prefecture designated routes for resident to flee the 30-km radius were cut off, leaving communities isolated.

=== Lawsuit ===
On 13 May 2024, Kanazawa District Court held a hearing on a case, in which the plaintiffs are seeking the plant's decommission.

== Reactors on site ==
Unit	Type	Commission date	Electric Power	Thermal Power	Maker
Shika – 1	BWR-5	July 30, 1993	540 MW	1,593 MW	Hitachi
Shika – 2	ABWR	March 15, 2006	1,358 MW	3,926 MW	Hitachi

== See also ==
- List of nuclear power plants in Japan
