= Chugoku Electric Power Company =

Japanese electric utility company

The Chugoku Electric Power Company, Incorporated 中国電力株式会社
- Type: Public KK (TYO: 9504)
- Industry: Energy
- Headquarters: Hiroshima, Hiroshima, Japan
- Area served: Chūgoku region of Japan
- Revenue: ¥1,038,443 million (2010, consolidated)
- Operating income: ¥81,515 million (2010, consolidated)
- Net income: ¥31,001 million (2010, consolidated)
- Total assets: ¥2,781,990 million (2010, consolidated)
- Total equity: ¥679,685 million (2010, consolidated)
- Number of employees: 14,146 (2010, consolidated)
- Website: www.energia.co.jp

The Chugoku Electric Power Company, Incorporated (Japanese: 中国電力株式会社, Chūgoku Denryoku Kabushiki-gaisha), trading as EnerGia (Japanese: エネルギア, Enerugia) (Latin for "energy") is an electric utility with its exclusive operational area of Chūgoku region of Japan. It is the sixth largest by electricity sales among Japan's ten regional power utilities. It operates the Shimane Nuclear Power Plant.

In 1982, Chugoku Electric Power Company proposed building a nuclear power plant near the island of Iwaishima, but many residents opposed the idea, and the island's fishing cooperative voted overwhelmingly against the plans. In January 1983, almost 400 islanders staged a protest march, which was the first of more than 1,000 protests the islanders carried out. Since the Fukushima nuclear disaster in March 2011 there has been wider opposition to construction plans for the plant.

In December 2024, Chugoku Electric Power announced to restart its Shimane nuclear power station in western Japan which has been shuttered since 2011.

To restart the Shimane reactor, Chugoku Electric would need a total investment of almost $6 billion.

In September 2026, Chugoku Electric announced ¥149 billion in transition financing from eight financial institutions, guaranteed by the GX Promotion Organization. The funds were designated for safety upgrades at Unit 3 of the Shimane Nuclear Power Plant and refurbishment of a hydroelectric plant in Shimane Prefecture.

== See also ==
- Ashes to Honey
- Anti-nuclear movement in Japan
