= Onagawa Nuclear Power Plant =

Nuclear power plant in Japan

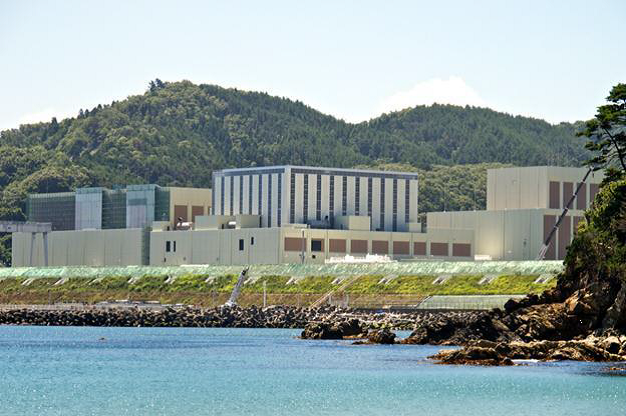
- The Onagawa Nuclear Power Plant
- Country: Japan
- Coordinates: 38°24′04″N 141°29′59″E
- Status: Operatonal (Unit 2 only)
- Construction began: July 8, 1980
- Commission date: June 1, 1984
- Decommission date: 2018 (unit 1)
- Operator: Tohoku Electric Power Company

Nuclear power station
- Reactor type: BWR

Power generation
- Units operational: 1 x 524 MW; 2 x 825 MW
- Nameplate capacity: 2,174 MW
- Capacity factor: 0%
- Annual net output: 0 GW·h

External links
- Website: www.tohoku-epco.co.jp/genshi/onagawa/index.html, English version
- Commons: Related media on Commons

The Onagawa Nuclear Power Plant (女川原子力発電所, Onagawa genshiryoku hatsudensho; Onagawa NPP) is a nuclear power plant located on a 1,730,000 m^{2} (432 acres) site in Onagawa in the Oshika District and Ishinomaki city, Miyagi Prefecture, Japan. It is managed by the Tohoku Electric Power Company. It was the most quickly constructed nuclear power plant in the world.

All the reactors were constructed by Toshiba. The Onagawa-3 unit was used as a prototype for the Higashidori Nuclear Power Plant.

The plant had been shut down after the 2011 Tōhoku earthquake and tsunami. The Onagawa nuclear power plant was the closest nuclear power plant to the epicenter, and facing the Pacific Ocean on Japan's north-east coast, experienced very high levels of ground shaking – among the strongest of any plant affected by the earthquake – and some flooding from the tsunami that followed. All three reactors at the power plant successfully withstood the earthquake and tsunami without accident.

Following an IAEA inspection in 2012, the agency stated that "The structural elements of the NPS (nuclear power station) were remarkably undamaged given the magnitude of ground motion experienced and the duration and size of this great earthquake". More recently, Tohoku Electric reported that the third floor of No. 2 reactor building lost about 70% of its structural rigidity and the first floors lost 25%, compared to when they were built, and was planning to reinforce the structures for increased quake resistance. In 2013 the station operators sent an application request to restart unit 2 at Onagawa to the Japanese Nuclear Regulation Authority (NRA). Reactor 2 finally restarted on October 29 2024.

== Reactors ==
Unit	Type	Start construction	First criticality	Commercial operation	Electric Power	Comments
Onagawa – 1	BWR	8 July 1980	18 October 1983	1 June 1984	524 MW	To be decommissioned
Onagawa – 2	BWR	12 April 1991	2 November 1994	28 July 1995	825 MW	Restart 29 October 2024 after Fukushima shutdown
Onagawa – 3	BWR	23 January 1998	26 April 2001	30 January 2002	825 MW	Restart pending

It was announced in 2018, that Onagawa Unit 1 which has been idled since 2011 will be decommissioned. Tohoku Electric resumed operations of the Onagawa Unit 2 reactor in 2024 following significant safety improvements.

== Environmental impact ==
The plant conforms fully to ISO 14001, a set of international environmental management standards. The plant's waste heat water leaves 7 degrees Celsius higher than it came in and is released 10 meters under the surface of the water, in order to reduce adverse effects on the environment.

== History ==
=== 2005 Miyagi earthquake ===
The Onagawa Nuclear Power Plant was affected by the 2005 Miyagi earthquake and recorded vibrations above what the plant was designed for. Analysis after the event, however, found no damage to the reactor systems. Some people reported seeing smoke come from the plant after the earthquake and reported it, thinking that it indicated an accident, but the smoke was actually produced by the backup diesel generators.

=== 2011 Tōhoku earthquake ===
The estimated tsunami heights before making landfall, from destroyed buoy gauges. Alternatively, from a 25 March 2011 report made by the Port and Airport Research Institute (PARI), which determined tsunami height by visiting the port areas, the Fishery port of Onagawa experienced 15 m (50 ft), the highest of all surveyed areas.

The Onagawa Nuclear Power Plant was the closest nuclear power plant to the epicenter of the 2011 Tōhoku earthquake, less than half the distance of the stricken Fukushima I power plant. The town of Onagawa to the northeast of the plant was largely destroyed by the tsunami which followed the earthquake, but the plant's 14 meters (46 ft) high seawall was tall and robust enough to prevent the power plant from experiencing severe flooding. Yanosuke Hirai, who died in 1986, is cited as the only person on the entire power station construction project to push for the 14.8-meter breakwater. Although many of his colleagues regarded 12 meters as sufficient, Hirai's authority eventually prevailed, and Tōhoku Electric spent the extra money to build the 14.8m tsunami wall. Another of Hirai's proposals also helped ensure the safety of the plant during the tsunami: expecting the sea to draw back before a tsunami, he made sure the plant's water intake cooling system pipes were designed so it could still draw water for cooling the reactors.

All safety systems functioned as designed, the reactors automatically shut down without damage, and no reactor damage occurred. A fire broke out in the turbine hall, which is sited separately from the plant's reactor in a building housing the electricity-generating turbine, but was soon extinguished.

Following the tsunami, two to three hundred residents of the town who lost their homes to the tsunami took refuge in the Onagawa nuclear plant's gymnasium, as the reactor complex was the only safe area in the vicinity to evacuate to, with the reactor operators supplying food and blankets to the needy. At the time Reuters suggested that the Onagawa nuclear power plant may demonstrate that it is possible for nuclear facilities to withstand the greatest natural disasters, and to retain public trust. The plant was shut down following the earthquake and tsunami, in accordance with standard legally mandated procedure after such an event, but despite the IAEA finding that the plant had survived the quake remarkably undamaged, the three units remained in cold shutdown until 2024 when reactor 2 was restarted. Whereas the mishaps at Fukushima I radically changed public opinion on safety and risks, Tohoku Electric seems to have preserved much of its pre-disaster goodwill in the area of Onagawa. While the tsunami was more than 13m high at both Fukushima I and the Onagawa power plant, the largest difference between them, apart from the reactor safety systems being designed some twenty years apart, was that the Fukushima I seawall was built to a height of just 5.7m, while the Onagawa power plant seawall was nearly 14 m (46 ft) high and thus successfully blocked the majority of the tsunami from causing severe flood damage. It was this tsunami that has been determined to be solely responsible for precipitating the loss of cooling and ultimately the Fukushima disaster at Fukushima I which had a much shorter sea wall of 5.7 m (19 ft). In response to the high tsunami, Onagawa power plant's seawall was later built up to a height of 17 m (56 ft).

On 13 March 2011, two days after the earthquake and tsunami, levels of radiation on site reached 21μSv/hour, a level at which Tohoku Electric Power Company were mandated to declare a state of emergency, and they did so at 12:50, declaring the lowest-level such state. Within 10 minutes the level had dropped to 10μSv/hour. The Japanese authorities believe the temporarily heightened values were due to radiation from the Fukushima I nuclear accidents and not from the Onagawa plant. On 13 March, 20:45 UTC, the IAEA announced that radiation levels at the Onagawa plant had returned to normal background levels.

An 7 April 2011 aftershock damaged 2 of the 3 power lines connecting to the plant, but it did not damage any of the backup cooling systems, which remained undamaged and unneeded, including the ESWS, the ECCS and the back up diesel generators.

=== 2013–2024 reactor restart requests ===
In 2013 the owners of the station, Tohoku Electric Power Company, sent a restart request to the Nuclear Regulation Authority (NRA) for Onagawa 2. They can only be restarted after passing an assessment by the Nuclear Regulatory Agency, which in turn is waiting on completion of construction of newly-required safety measures. The utility company expected to complete construction by March 2019, and planned to restart Onagawa 2 by fiscal year 2020.

In November 2019 the NRA gave approval for Onagawa 2 to be restarted subject to local approvals, consultation and further anti-disaster work. The reactor was expected to be restarted in 2021 following upgrade work.

In 2020 it was confirmed that Onagawa 2 met Japanese safety requirements again. It finally came back online in October 2024.

In contrast, Onagawa 1 has been slated for decommissioning, the tenth operable reactor to do so since the Fukushima Daiichi nuclear disaster. Costs of bringing Onagawa 1 to the standards set by the Nuclear Regulation Authority and subsequent maintenance are considered too expensive and time-consuming in comparison to the other two units. Further complicating the issue, a new rule was set by the NRA in the wake of the Fukushima disaster which limits the operational life of nuclear reactors to 40 years. Onagawa 1 has operated since 1984, and therefore would only be able to operate a few more years even if it were approved to restart.

== See also ==
- Nuclear power in Japan
- List of boiling water reactors
- List of nuclear power plants in Japan
