= Tohoku Electric Power =

Japanese electric utility company

Tohoku Electric Power Co., Inc. 東北電力株式会社

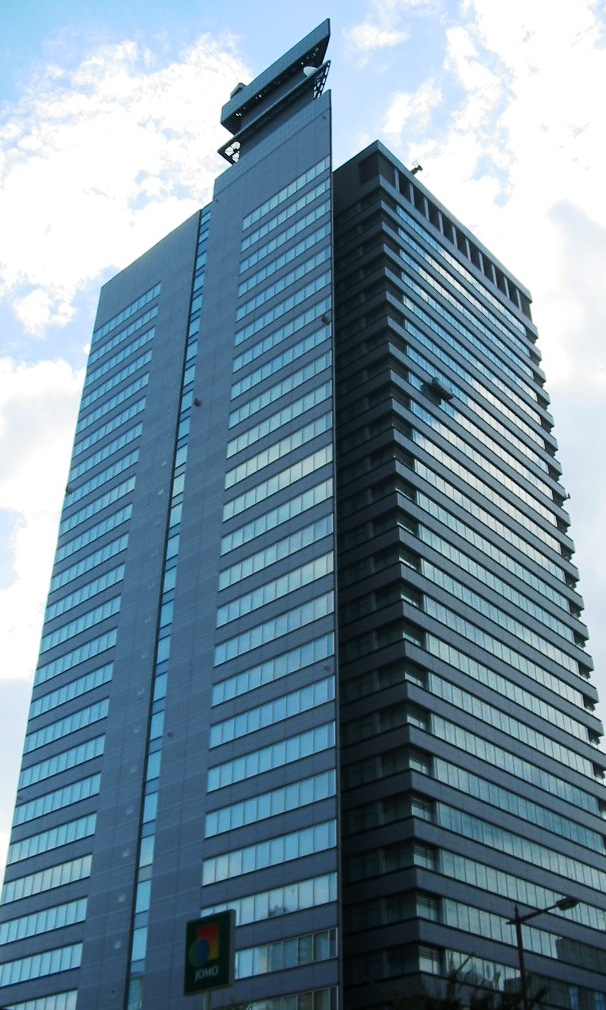
- Tohoku Electric Power headquarters in Aoba-ku, Sendai
- Company type: Public KK
- Traded as: TYO: 9506; OSE: 9506
- Industry: Electric utility
- Founded: May 1, 1955
- Headquarters: Aoba-ku, Sendai, Miyagi, Japan
- Area served: Aomori, Akita, Iwate, Yamagata, Miyagi, Fukushima, Niigata
- Key people: Keiichi Makuta, Chairman; Hiroaki Takahashi, President
- Products: Electricity generation and transmission
- Revenue: JP¥1,708,732 million (FY 2010)
- Operating income: ▲JP¥114,644 million (FY 2010)
- Net income: ▼JP¥-33,707 million (FY 2010)
- Total assets: ▲JP¥4,028,861 million (FY 2010)
- Total equity: ▼JP¥876,488 million (FY 2010)
- Number of employees: 12,484 (2010)
- Website: www.Tohoku-EPCO.co.jp

Tohoku Electric Power Co., Inc. (東北電力株式会社, Tōhoku Denryoku Kabushiki Gaisha) is an electric utility, servicing 7.6 million individual and corporate customers in six prefectures in Tōhoku region plus Niigata Prefecture. It provides electricity at 100 V, 50 Hz, though some areas use 60 Hz.

Tohoku Electric Power is the fourth-largest electric utility in Japan in terms of revenue, behind TEPCO, KEPCO and Chubu Electric Power.

== Shareholders ==
- Nippon Life Insurance Company 3.9%
- Japan Trustee Services Bank 3.8%
- The Master Trust Bank of Japan 3.6%

== Accidents ==
On 11 March 2011, several nuclear reactors in Japan were badly damaged by the 2011 Tōhoku earthquake and tsunami. In the Onagawa Nuclear Power Plant a fire broke out in the turbine section of the plant.

In order to make up for the loss of electricity from the damaged reactor plant, Tohoku announced it would restart a mothballed natural gas power plant. The liquefied natural gas and oil-fired No. 1 unit at the Higashi Niigata plant in Niigata prefecture has a 350-megawatt capacity and could be in operation by early June 2011.

== See also ==
- Energy in Japan
- Nuclear power in Japan
