= Russian Vietnamese =

Russian Vietnamese or Vietnamese Russian may refer to:

- Russia-Vietnam relations
- Vietnamese people in Russia
