= YokosoNews =

Presentation
- Hosted by: Katsuyuki "Katz" Ueno (上野 勝之)
- Genre: Public outreach
- Language: English

Publication
- Original release: April 2010

YokosoNews is a live video streaming site in English dedicated to Japanese culture, lifestyle and entertainment.

== 2011 Tōhoku earthquake and tsunami ==
During the aftermath of 2011 Tōhoku earthquake and tsunami, YokosoNews interrupted its regular schedule and dedicated its broadcast to the latest news on the earthquake and developing nuclear accidents.

They provided real time translations of both breaking news from major Japanese media outlets as well as the press conferences held by the government and its agencies, TEPCO and others. Starting in mid-April, YokosoNews began to provide weekly disaster updates.
