= Ryōkichi Sagane =

Japanese nuclear physicist (1905–1969)

- 嵯峨根 遼吉
- Born: 27 November 1905; Bunkyō-ku, Tokyo, Japan
- Died: 16 April 1969 (aged 63)
- Education: Tokyo Imperial University
- Known for: Cyclotron research; recipient of the Nagasaki letter; development of nuclear power in Japan; the "Sagane Magnet"
- Father: Hantaro Nagaoka
- Scientific career
- Fields: Nuclear physics
- Institutions: Tokyo Imperial University; University of California, Berkeley; Japan Atomic Energy Research Institute (JAERI); Japan Atomic Power Company (JAPCO)

Ryōkichi Sagane (嵯峨根 遼吉, 27 November 1905 – 16 April 1969) was a Japanese nuclear physicist who played a prominent role in the development of nuclear power generation in Japan. In 1945 he was the recipient of a letter written by American physicists working on the Manhattan Project, which was dropped over Japan during the atomic bombing of Nagasaki.

== Early life and education ==
Sagane was born on 27 November 1905 in Bunkyō-ku, Tokyo, the fifth son of the distinguished physicist Hantaro Nagaoka. In 1926 he entered the Department of Physics at Tokyo Imperial University, and in 1929 he joined the university's graduate school, working in the laboratory of Shōji Nishikawa, who was then conducting X-ray crystal analysis.

== Research at Berkeley and wartime work ==
In August 1935, Sagane joined a team at the Radiation Laboratory of the University of California, Berkeley, in the United States, working on the cyclotron designed by Ernest O. Lawrence. During his time there he became acquainted with a number of American scientists, including Luis W. Alvarez, Edwin M. McMillan, Arthur Snell, William Brobeck and Bernard Kinsey, many of whom would later work on the Manhattan Project.

Sagane returned to Japan in February 1938 and continued his work with a smaller cyclotron there. During the Second World War he was involved in military research and, in what became known as the Suzuki report, suggested to military personnel the possibility of building an atomic bomb.

== The Nagasaki letter ==
In August 1945 the United States dropped atomic bombs on Hiroshima and Nagasaki. During the Nagasaki bombing on 9 August, a radiosonde was dropped from an observation aircraft with an attached letter addressed to Sagane from three anonymous American scientists. The senders were later identified as Luis Alvarez, Philip Morrison and Robert Serber, all of whom had worked on the Manhattan Project and who had known Sagane from his years at Berkeley. The letter asked Sagane to use his influence as a nuclear physicist to persuade the Japanese leadership to stop the war.

=== Text of the letter ===
Headquarters
Atomic Bomb Command
August 9, 1945

To: Prof. R. Sagane
From: Three of your former scientific colleagues during your stay in the United States.

We are sending this as a personal message to urge that you use your influence as a reputable nuclear physicist, to convince the Japanese General Staff of the terrible consequences which will be suffered by your people if you continue in this war.

You have known for several years that an atomic bomb could be built if a nation were willing to pay the enormous cost of preparing the necessary material. Now that you have seen that we have constructed the production plants, there can be no doubt in your mind that all the output of these factories, working 24 hours a day, will be exploded on your homeland.

Within the space of three weeks, we have proof-fired one bomb in the American desert, exploded one in Hiroshima, and fired the third this morning.

We implore you to confirm these facts to your leaders, and to do your utmost to stop the destruction and waste of life which can only result in the total annihilation of all your cities, if continued. As scientists, we deplore the use to which a beautiful discovery has been put, but we can assure you that unless Japan surrenders at once, this rain of atomic bombs will increase manyfold in fury.

=== Discovery and delivery ===
The letter was discovered by a Japanese naval officer, Kenzō Mashiko, but it was not delivered to Sagane until October 1945, after the war had ended.

== Post-war career and nuclear power in Japan ==
In 1949 Sagane returned to Berkeley, where he invented a spiral orbit magnetic spectrometer that was used for muon experiments. The device became known as the "Sagane Magnet".

In 1956 he was appointed Director of the Japan Atomic Energy Research Institute (JAERI). His most important achievement at JAERI was the introduction of an experimental light-water power reactor, the Japan Power Demonstration Reactor (JPDR), a 12.5 MWe boiling water reactor manufactured by General Electric of the United States.

In 1960 Sagane was elected chairman of the Special Committee for Nuclear Fusion, and in May 1966 he became vice-president of the Japan Atomic Power Company (JAPCO).
