= Russia–Vietnam relations =

- Russia: Vietnam

Diplomatic mission
- Russian embassy, Hanoi: Vietnamese embassy, Moscow

Russia–Vietnam relations (Russian: Российско-вьетнамские отношения, romanized: Rossiysko-v'yetnamskiye otnosheniya, Vietnamese: Quan hệ Nga – Việt) date back formally to 30 January 1950, when the Union of Soviet Socialist Republics established relations with Democratic Republic of Vietnam. The Soviet Union was one of the first countries in the world to recognize and formally establish diplomatic relations with Vietnam, laying the foundations for strong and cooperative friendship between the two countries.

== History ==
=== Early years ===
The first Vietnamese appeared in the USSR in the early 1920s. These were students from Comintern universities, mainly from the Communist University of the Toilers of the East. About 70 Vietnamese passed through this system of communist education in Soviet Russia. Ho Chi Minh studied in Moscow in the 1920s, along with other members of the Indochinese Communist Party.

The Soviet Union was the second country, after the newly established People's Republic of China, to diplomatically recognize the Democratic Republic of Vietnam during the First Indochina War in January 1950. The Soviet Union pressured the Viet Minh delegation to accept partition as a compromise solution to the conflict at the 1954 Geneva Conference. Later, in 1964, Soviet Premier Alexei Kosygin visited Hanoi to try to dissuade Lê Duẩn against escalating the Vietnam War against South Vietnam and the United States. Nevertheless, the USSR was traditionally one of Vietnam's strongest allies and offered crucial military aid to North Vietnam during the war. Aid included air-defense equipment such as radar and surface-to-air missiles. It also included pilot training and aircraft, such as "some all-weather MIG fighters" and several IL-28 light bombers.

During the Sino-Soviet split, Vietnam initially sought to balance relations with China on one hand and the USSR on the other. Vietnamese leadership was divided over which of the countries to support. The pro-Soviet group led by Lê Duẩn eventually developed momentum, especially as China sought to improve its relations with the United States, which Vietnamese leadership viewed as a betrayal of the China-Vietnam relationship. Vietnam's increasing closeness with the USSR in turn alarmed Chinese leadership, which feared encirclement by the USSR. This contributed to China's decision to invade Vietnam, beginning the 1979 Sino-Vietnamese War.

Vietnam joined the Council for Mutual Economic Assistance on June 28, 1978. Soviet military aid to Vietnam increased from $75-$125 million in 1977 to $600-$800 million in 1978. On November 3, 1978, Vietnam and the Soviet Union signed a formal military alliance. The Soviet Union supported Vietnam's invasion of Cambodia, launched in December 1978.

The Soviet Union, although it did not take direct military action, provided intelligence and equipment support for Vietnam during the 1979 Sino-Vietnamese War. The Soviets deployed troops at the Sino-Soviet border as an act of showing support to Vietnam, as well as tying up Chinese troops. The Soviet Pacific Fleet also deployed 15 ships to the Vietnamese coast to relay Chinese battlefield communications to Vietnamese forces.

=== Vietnam and Russia ===
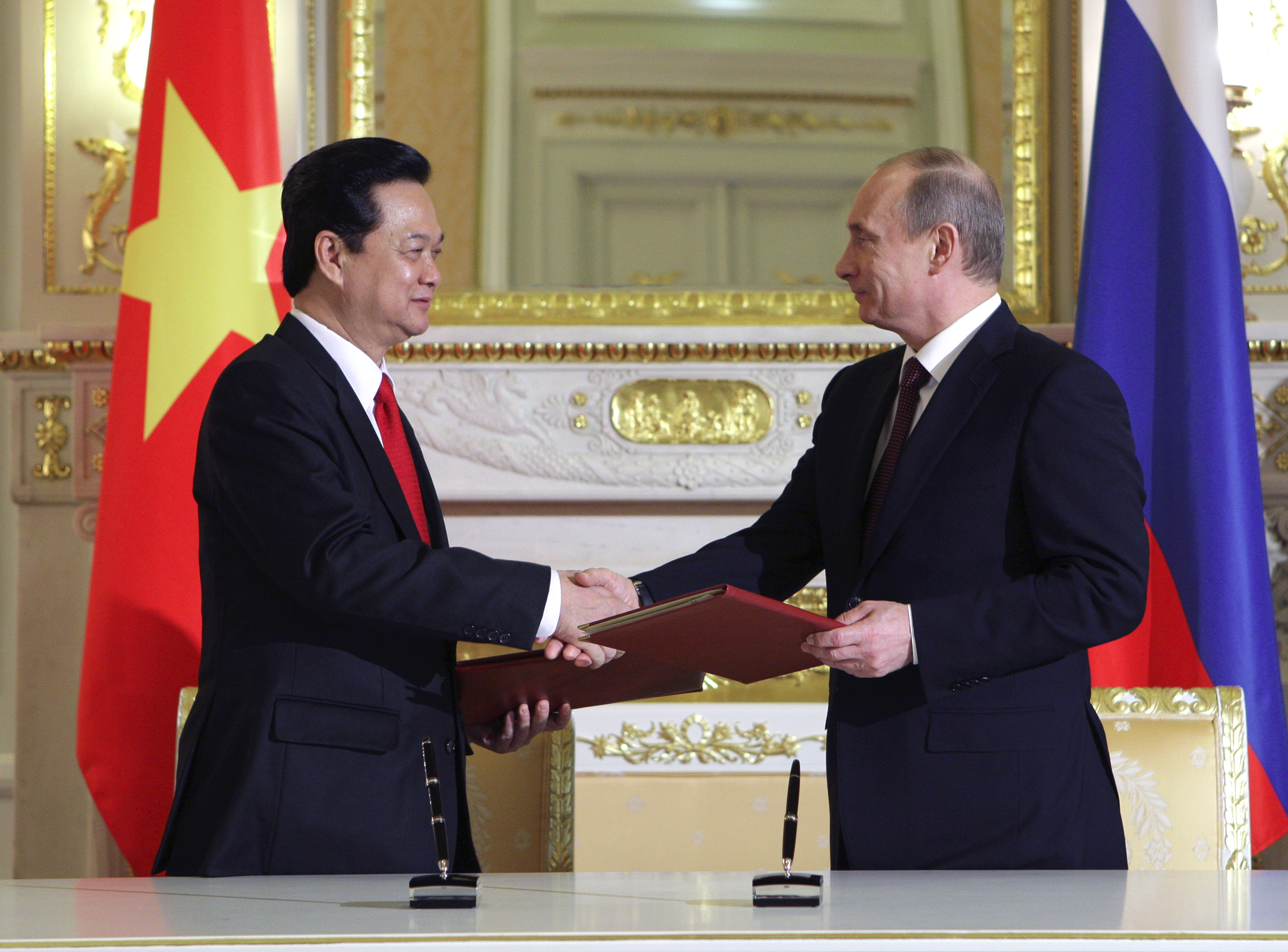
Prime Ministers Nguyễn Tấn Dũng of Vietnam and Vladimir Putin of Russia, December 2009

After the dissolution of the Soviet Union in 1991, friendly relations were established between Vietnam and the Russian Federation, the USSR's main successor state. Nearly 5% of the official count of the Vietnamese population in Russia is composed of students with Russian government scholarships. In January 2001, to commemorate the 50th anniversary of Soviet-Vietnam ties, Russian president Vladimir Putin made an official visit to Hanoi, where he was received by Vietnamese president Trần Đức Lương. Bilateral trade amounted to $550 million in 2001; Russian exports to Vietnam included machinery and steel, while Vietnam sold textiles and rice. The two countries also maintained relations in the energy sector, with joint venture Vietsovpetro pumping crude oil from the Bạch Hổ oil field.

After the Vietnam War ended in 1975, the Soviet Union became a benefactor to the country during the 1980s until the USSR collapsed in 1991, leaving Vietnam with a weakened ideological, economic and military ally. In rhetoric, Vietnam officially remains one of the world's last communist countries – the communist hammer-and-sickle flag can still be seen – but it has embraced a "socialist-oriented market economy" along with Asian and Western investment over the past two decades.

Sergey Lavrov, Foreign Minister of Russia, visited Vietnam in July 2009. "Relations between the two countries have developed positively," Lavrov said. "We are convinced that the bilateral cooperation will be at a high level."

Since 2022, at the Kremlin's request, Vietnam has deported several Russian citizens living in Vietnam because they criticized the Russian invasion of Ukraine. Several public opinion brigades' pages on Facebook, originally established to disseminate propaganda for the Communist Party of Vietnam, circulated disinformation in support of the invasion.

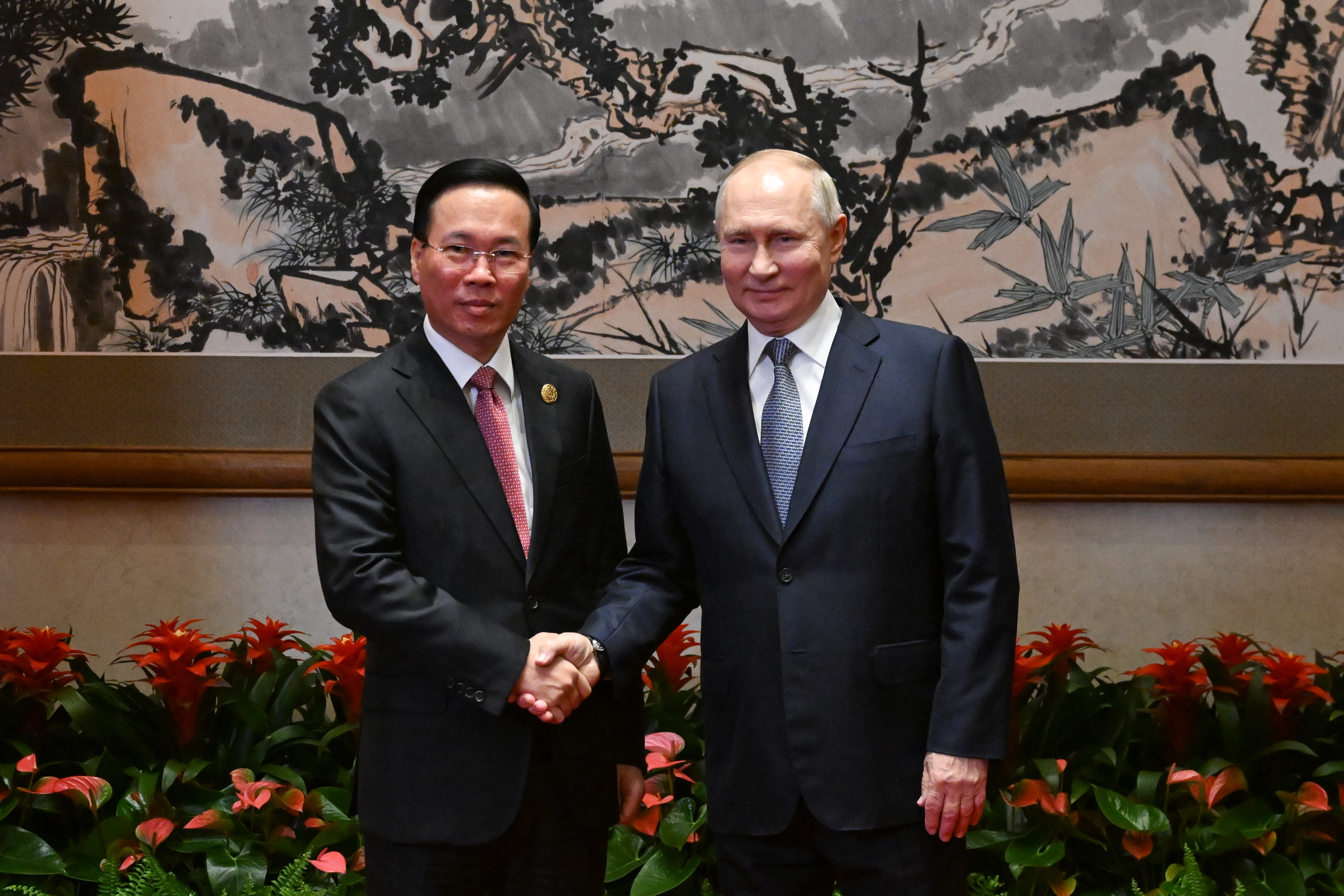
Vietnamese President Võ Văn Thưởng with Russian President Putin, 17 October 2023

In July 2022, Sergey Lavrov met with Vietnamese Foreign Minister Bùi Thanh Sơn in Hanoi. Lavrov called Vietnam a "key partner" of Russia in ASEAN.

In March 2022 and February 2023, Vietnam abstained from UN votes to condemn the Russian invasion of Ukraine. The Vietnamese government told reporters not to say "invasion", and to minimize coverage of the war in Ukraine.

Between 21–23 May 2023, deputy chairman of Russia's Security Council, Dmitry Medvedev, visited Hanoi and met with Vietnam's Communist Party chief Nguyễn Phú Trọng. They discussed the strengthening of ties between Russia and Vietnam and the current international situation.

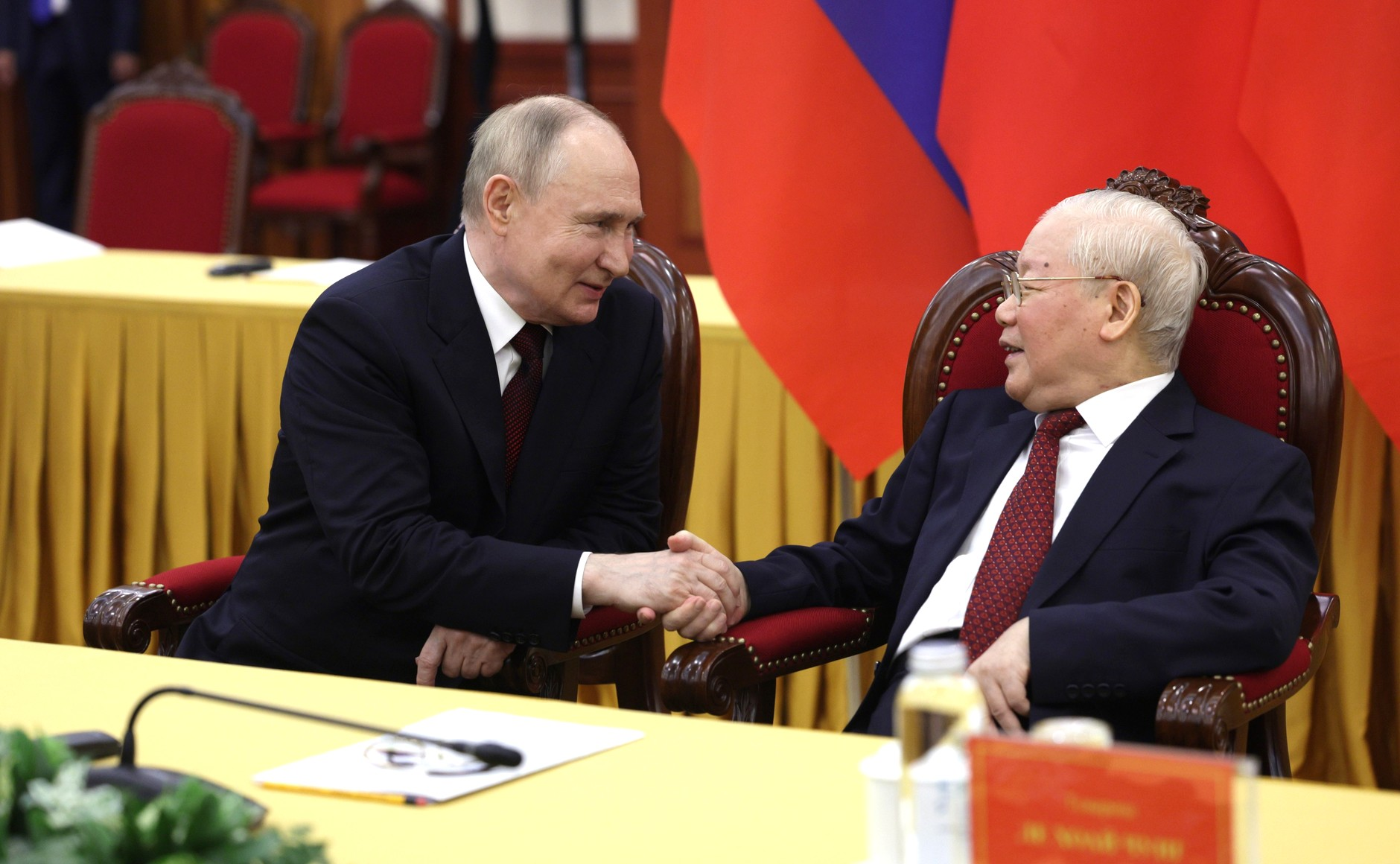
Vietnam's Communist Party chief Nguyễn Phú Trọng with Russian President Vladimir Putin in Hanoi, June 2024

On 19–20 June 2024, Russian President Vladimir Putin visited Vietnam. He met with Communist Party of Vietnam (CPV)'s General Secretary Nguyễn Phú Trọng and President Tô Lâm. Putin thanked Vietnam for its "balanced position" on the Russian invasion of Ukraine. According to Vietnamese officials, Putin "is expected to announce agreements in sectors including trade, investment, technology and education," and talks will also focus on energy and arms.

On his 14–15 January 2025 visit to Ha Noi, Russian Prime Minister Mikhail Mishustin paid a courtesy call to General Secretary Tô Lâm and State President Lương Cường, held talks with Prime Minister Phạm Minh Chính, and met with the National Assembly Chairperson Trần Thanh Mẫn. The prime ministers chaired a meeting on cooperation including politics, trade, technology and defence.

On the 80th anniversary of the Russia’s Victory Day, Vietnam sent 68 of its officers and soldiers to Moscow to participate in the military parade, alongside Russian armed forces and other international military contingents from 13 countries. This marked the first time that the People's Army of Vietnam (PAVN) have ever joined in an abroad military parade, strengthening traditional relationship and comprehensive strategic partnership between Vietnam and Russia.

The Russian and Ukrainian embassies in Vietnam kept trading barbs in Vietnamese language on Facebook, where engagement appeared to favor pro-Russia sentiment. Nguyễn Hồng Thạch, former Vietnamese Ambassador to Ukraine from 2020 to 2024, said that many Vietnamese tend to support Russia and blame the Ukrainian government for aligning with the West to weaken Russia. Vietnamese communist or Russophile netizens frequently reacted with laughing emojis to Facebook posts reporting on Russian missile strikes that killed Ukrainian civilians, including children.

== Military cooperation ==
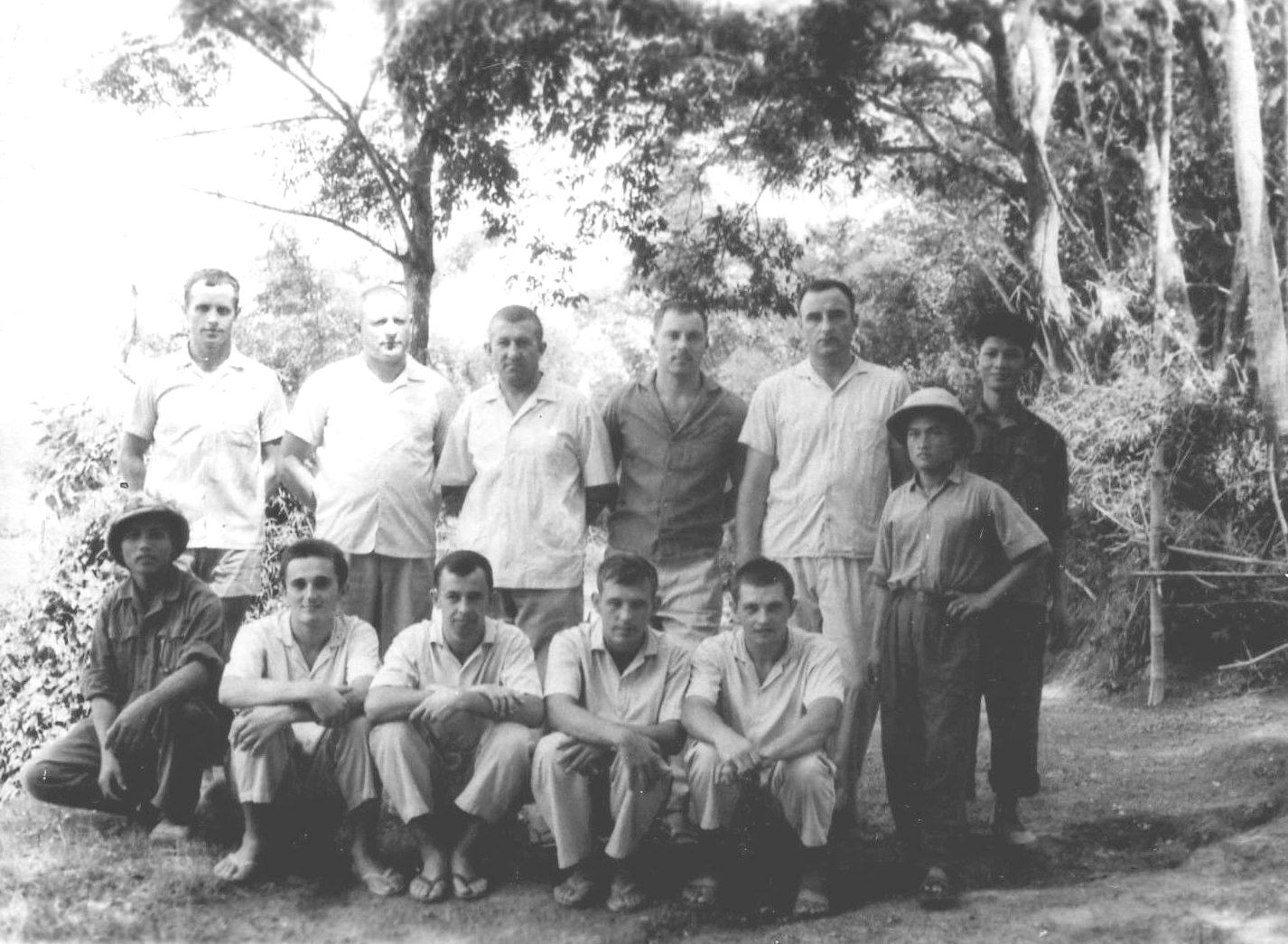
A regimental group of Soviet military specialists with the 238th Anti-Aircraft Missile Regiment of the VPA.

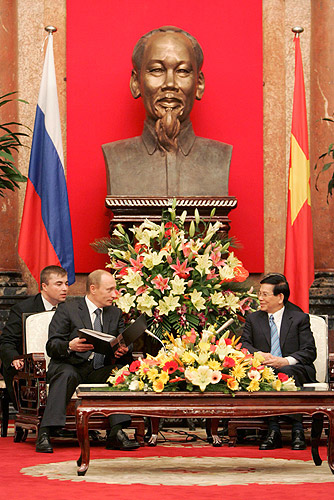
Vladimir Putin and Nguyễn Minh Triết.

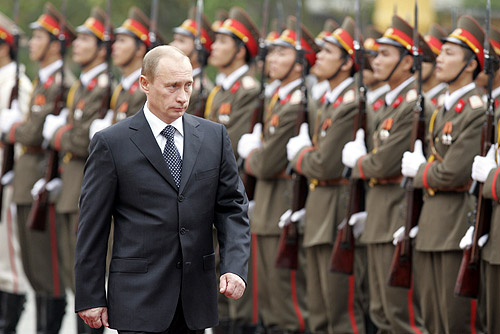
Vladimir Putin during the official welcome ceremony to Vietnam in 2006.

The military cooperation between the Russian Armed Forces and the People's Army of Vietnam had fallen off since the dissolution of the Soviet Union. An increasingly more assertive People's Republic of China in its claims to the Spratly Islands dispute has prompted Vietnam to gradually deepen its strategic relationship with India, another long-standing USSR and Russian partner and ally, and Russia itself, with the Russian government recently signing several military contracts with Vietnam involving the sale of six Varshavyanka-class submarines and twelve new Sukhoi Su-30MK2 multirole fighter aircraft. In addition, Russian Prime Minister Dmitry Medvedev approved of a draft Russian-Vietnamese military cooperation pact towards the end of August 2013 formalizing the two nations' defense cooperation.

In November 2014, against the backdrop of intensified diplomatic confrontation between Russia and the West referred to by some as Cold War II, an agreement was signed by Russia and Vietnam that significantly simplified the use of the Cam Ranh Base by the Russian Navy. According to the US, Russia's intensified air force activities in the region that relied on the use of the base to refuel its nuclear-capable strategic bombers TU-95, engaged in "provocative" flights, including around Guam, home to a major US air and naval installation. In March 2015, according to the US, these actions caused the US military command to publicly voice concern and acknowledge its diplomatic intervention regarding the issue. Vladimir Putin has stated Vietnam as his "important ally" and will furthermore hope to resume military cooperation in the future.

=== Cam Ranh Base ===
The Soviet and Russian Navy had until 2002 maintained a presence in Vietnam at the US-built military base in Cam Ranh Bay which had been turned over to the Republic of Vietnam Navy and captured by North Vietnamese forces in 1975. By 1987, the Soviets expanded the base to four times its original size. The Soviet Union and Vietnam officially denied the base's existence. In 1988, the Soviet Foreign minister Eduard Shevardnadze discussed the option of withdrawal from Cam Ranh Bay, and the reduction in forces was effected by 1990. Although Russian military presence no longer exist at Cam Ranh Bay, Russia is currently still using the existing base as a supply station allowed by the Vietnam People's Navy.

=== Soviet military specialists ===
A group of Soviet Armed Forces military specialists in Vietnam came at the invitation of Ho Chi Minh personally to render military and engineering assistance to the Vietnamese People's Army. From July 1965 to December 1974, more than 6000 generals and officers and more than 4,500 soldiers were sent to Vietnam as specialists. Small contingents of auxiliary forces from other states like Bulgaria and Cuba accompanied the Soviets. From 1975-2002, forty-four Soviet servicemen were killed in Vietnam, mainly in aviation accidents.

== Opinion polls ==
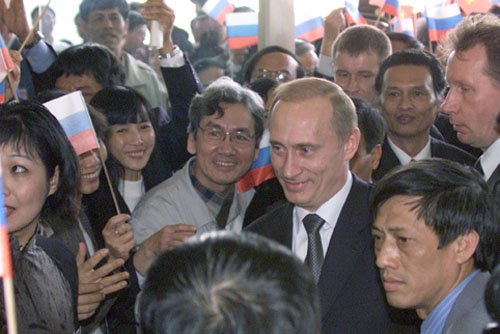
Putin and Victor Zolotov in Vietnam, March 2001

In 2017, 83% of Vietnamese had a favorable view of Russia and 89% of Vietnamese had a favorable view of Russian President Vladimir Putin.

== Bilateral trade and investment ==
=== Energy ===
Vietnam in 2008 approved the use of atomic power for civilian purposes, and Russia has already said it would like to take part in the planned programme. Khiem said the two sides also reaffirmed their traditional relations in other fields, including defence. That report came after the Russian newspaper Kommersant said Vietnam was also about to sign a deal for six Russian submarines. along with the Gepard class frigate and a joint production in anti ship missiles as military ties are growing again.

Vietnam's President Triet, on a visit to Moscow in October 2008, signed a pact for Vietnamese and Russian firms to develop energy fields off the Vietnam coast. In the telecommunications sector, Russia's VimpelCom on mid-July 2009 announced the commercial launch in Vietnam of its Beeline mobile service through GTEL-Mobile, a joint venture with a Vietnamese state-owned company. Lavrov was to travel Sunday July 26 to southern Ho Chi Minh City to meet local government officials there.

In the late 2000s, Russian influence in Vietnam has begun to grow again but remains far below that of Soviet times. On Saturday July 25, Vietnam and Russia signed a memorandum of understanding between their respective atomic energy agencies but no details were released. "Cooperation on atomic energy will be a priority", Lavrov said.

On 14 January 2025, Russia’s state-owned nuclear energy company Rosatom and Vietnam’s state-owned power utility EVN signed a nuclear cooperation agreement, during Russian prime minister Mikhail Mishustin’s visit to Hanoi. On March 23, 2026, Vietnam and Rosatom signed an agreement to revive Vietnam's nuclear program, focusing on constructing the Ninh Thuan 1 nuclear power plant.

=== Other ===
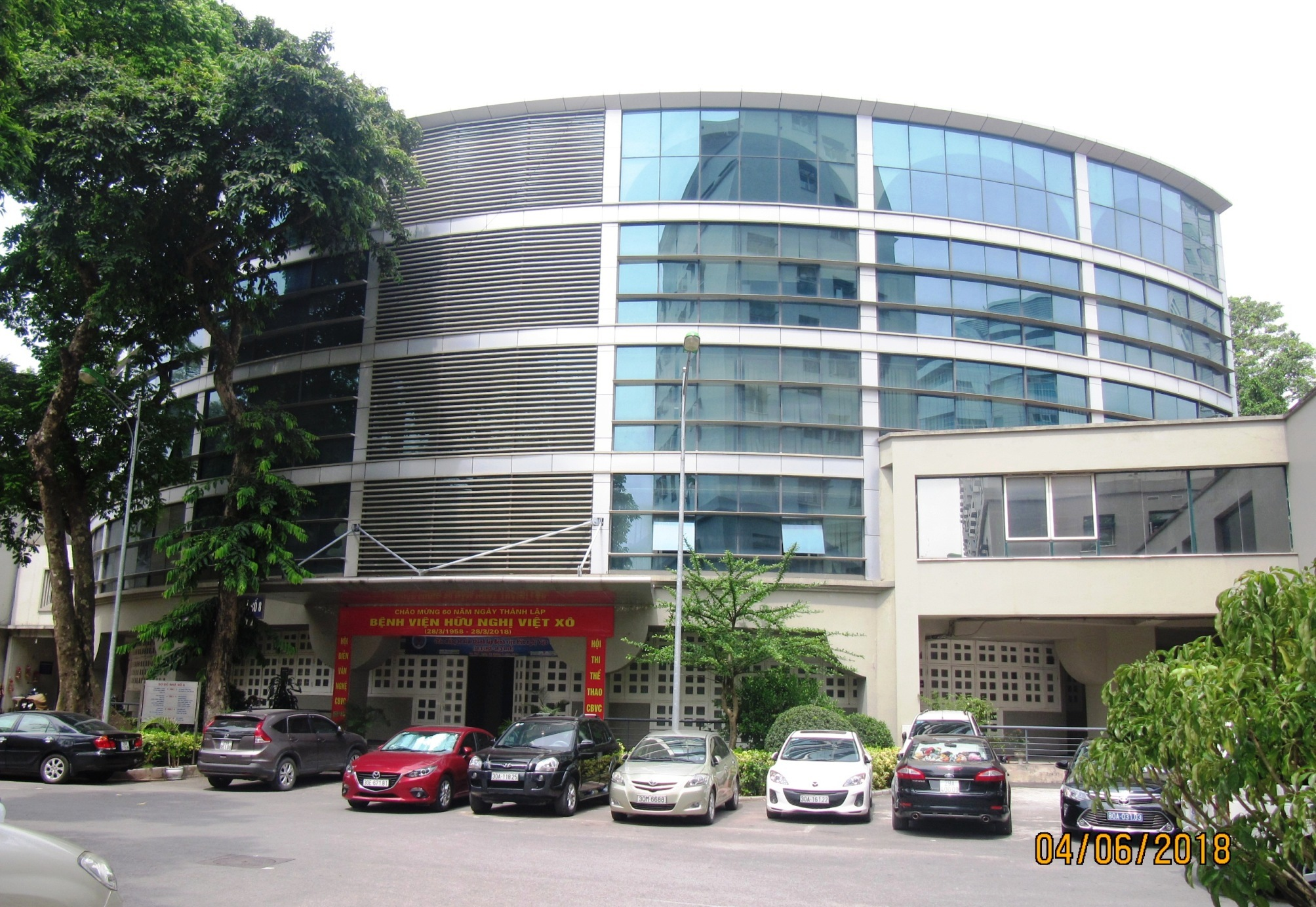
Vietnam-Soviet Friendship Hospital in Hanoi

Preliminary Vietnamese government data show that exports to Russia totalled almost 139 million dollars in the first five months of 2009 while imports were valued at about $525 million. Vietnam's former wartime enemy, the United States, which normalised diplomatic ties in 1995, received Vietnamese exports worth more than $4 billion in the first five months, the data showed. Imports exceeded $932 million. By 2012 trade between the two nations has reached $3.5 billion

In March 2013, Eurasian Economic Community minister of trade Andrey Slepnev visited Hanoi to open talks on the possibility of Vietnam joining the Eurasian Customs Union.

In September 2021, it was decided to create favourable conditions for the effective operation of Gazprom, Zarubezhneft and Novatek in Vietnam and PetroVietnam in Russia. Trade remains an important tool in enhancing bilateral ties.

== Diplomatic missions ==
- List of ambassadors of Russia to Vietnam

Of Vietnam

- Moscow (Embassy)
- Ekaterinburg (Consulate)
- Vladivostok (Consulate)

Of Russia

- Hanoi (Embassy)
- Ho Chi Minh City (Consulate)
- Da Nang (Consulate)

== See also ==
- Foreign relations of Russia
- Foreign relations of Vietnam
- Vietnamese people in Russia
- China–Vietnam relations
- United States–Vietnam relations
- Vietnam–European Union relations
