= Vietnam Atomic Energy Institute =

Government organization in Hanoi, Vietnam

- Viện Năng lượng nguyên tử Việt Nam
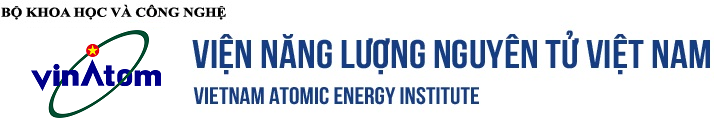

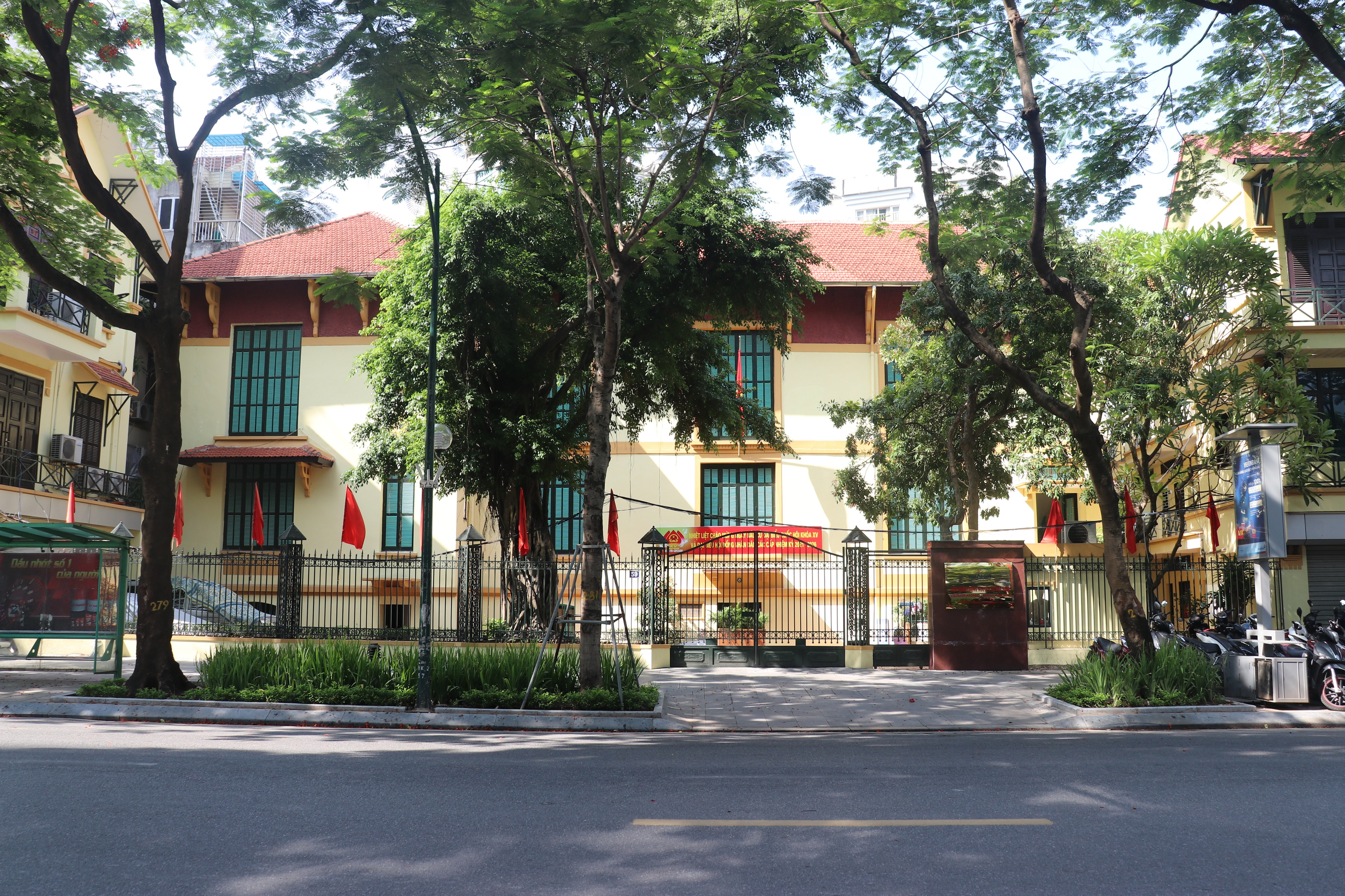
- VINATOM headquarters in Hanoi.
- Abbreviation: VINATOM
- Formation: February 23, 1979; 47 years ago
- Location: 59 Ly Thuong Kiet street, Hoan Kiem district, Hanoi, Vietnam
- Official language: Vietnamese
- President: Trần Chí Thành
- Website: vinatom.gov.vn

The Vietnam Atomic Energy Institute (VINATOM; Viện Năng lượng nguyên tử Việt Nam) is a special ranked scientific organization under the Ministry of Science and Technology, of which function is to assist Minister to perform duties including basic research, application and deployment of research results in the field of atomic energy, technical support for governmental management on atomic energy, radiation and nuclear safety, education and training in the field

== Functions & Duties ==
Function

Vietnam Atomic Energy Institute is a special ranked scientific organization under the Ministry of Science and Technology, of which its function is to assist the Minister to perform duties including basic research, application and deployment of research results in the field of atomic energy, technical support for governmental management on atomic energy, radiation and nuclear safety, education and training in the field.

Duty

1. To provide professional insights to the formulation of state directions, policies, strategies, planning and projects for atomic energy development in Vietnam, and participate in the establishment of legal and regulatory documents related to atomic energy;

2. To conduct fundamental research in the field of nuclear science and technology;

3. To implement national science and technology projects in the area of nuclear energy; to appraise comprehensively projects and programs in the area of nuclear energy as required;

4. To play the role as an independent organization that provides technical support at national level in quality control, quality assessment for construction, devices, nuclear safety and security assurance, as well as environmental protection in assisting the nuclear power plant programme;

5. To study and develop the application of nuclear techniques and radiation technology in various economic and industrial fields of the country; 6. To research, adopt, master and develop science and technology related to nuclear power plant construction and operation;

7. To conduct postgraduate education and training activities for technical staff of atomic energy field;

8. To convey science and technology services; transfer research achievements to mass production; develop and manufacture research achievements on experimental scale;

9. To organize investment business, import and export in the area of atomic energy;

10. To provide consultancy services on: project planning, supervision and verification, evaluation of design files and cost estimates of investment programs and projects as well as construction works in the field of atomic energy according to the provisions of law.

11. To perform the cooperation and collaboration with different organizations, individuals, both domestically and internationally, in terms of R&D, education and training in the field of nuclear energy.

== History ==
26/4/1976: Establishment of Dalat Nuclear Research Institute under the State Committee of Science and Technology

(According to Decision No. 64-CP dated April 26, 1976 of the Government Council)

23/2/1979: Establishment of Nuclear Research Institute (formerly known as the Da Lat Nuclear Institute) under the direct management of the Prime Minister

(According to Decree No. 59-CP dated February 23, 1979 of the Government Council)

20/3/1984: Inauguration of the restoration and expansion of Dalat Nuclear Reactor –The Reactor was put into operation

11/6/1984: Nuclear Research Institute was renamed National Atomic Energy Commission under the direct direction of Chairman of Council of Ministers

(According to Decree 87-HDBT dated June 11, 1984 of the Council of Ministers)

11/3/1986: Establishment of Hanoi Irradiation Center

(According to Decision No. 43/QD dated March 11, 1986 of the National Atomic Energy Commission)

21/1/1991: Establishment of Institute for Technology of Radioactive Waste and Rare Elements and Institute for Nuclear Science and Technology

(According to Decision No. 18-CT dated January 21, 1991 of the Chairman of Council of Ministers)

22/7/1991: Inauguration of Hanoi Irradiation Center

11/6/1991: Establishment of Center for Nuclear Technique Ho Chi Minh City

(According to Decree No. 87/ND-HDBT dated June 11, 1984 of the Council of Ministers)

13/9/1993: National Atomic Energy Commission was renamed Vietnam Atomic Energy Institute under the Ministry of Science, Technology and Environment (now the Ministry of Science and Technology)

(According to Decree No. 59/CP dated September 13, 1993 of the Government)

26/2/1998: Inauguration of Ho Chi Minh City Irradiation Installation

14/2/2000: Establishment of Research and Development Center for Radiation Technology

(According to Decision No. 159/QD-BKHCNMT dated February 14, 2000 of the Ministry of Science, Technology and Environment)

06/5/2002: Establishment of Technology Application and Development Company

(According to Decision No. 25/2002/QD-BKHCNMT dated May 6, 2002 of the Ministry of Science, Technology and Environment)

17/4/2007: Establishment of Center for Application of Nuclear Technique in Industry

(According to Decision No. 591/QD-BKHCN dated April 17, 2007 of the Ministry of Science and Technology)

26/8/2008: Establishment of Center for Non- Destructive Evaluation

(According to Decision No. 1850/QD-BKHCN dated August 26, 2008 of the Ministry of Science and Technology)

02/12/2010: Establishment of Nuclear Training Center

(According to Decision No. 2700/QD-BKHCN dated December 2, 2010 of the Ministry of Science and Technology)

06/01/2016: The Vietnam Atomic Energy Institute is a special-class scientific and technological organization under the Ministry of Science and Technology

(According to Decision No. 30/QD-TTg dated January 6, 2016 of the Prime Minister)

== Organizational Structures ==
Headquarter

1. Administration and Personal

2. Department of Planning and R&D Management

3. Department of International Co-Operation

Nuclear Power & Technical Supports

1. Institute for Nuclear Science and Technique

2. Institute for Technology of Radioactive and Rare Elements

3. Nuclear Research Institute

4. Nuclear Training Center

Applicants Of Radioisotopes

1. Center for Nuclear Techniques in Ho Chi Minh City

2. Center for Application of Nuclear Technique in Insdustry

3. Research and Development Center for Radiation Technology

4. Ha Noi Irradiation Center

5. Center of Nondestructive Evaluation

== See also ==
- Nuclear energy in Vietnam
