= Nuclear power in Vietnam =

Nuclear power plants in Vietnam(view)
Plants confirmed
Plants tentative

Vietnam is considering developing nuclear power for peaceful purposes based on modern, verified technology since 1995, and firm proposals surfaced in 2006. In November 2016 Vietnam suspended its nuclear power plans. In 2022 industry and trade minister Nguyen Hong Dien announced that developing nuclear power is an “inevitable trend” for Vietnam, and will help the country to become carbon neutral by 2050.

== Abandoned plans ==
The race to diversify beyond its primarily hydropower and coal energy mix is driven largely by the country's growing energy demand, which was expected to increase annually by 16%, e.g. from 16 GW (2010) to 30 GW (2015). Another factor is the challenges it faces in identifying new suitable hydro power project sites.

Its first ever nuclear power projects were planned be implemented in two major sites in Ninh Thuận Province. The 4 X 1000 MW Ninh Thuận 1 site at Phuoc Dinh, will be built in collaboration with Russian State company - Atomstroyexport, and will set the stage for the foundation of Vietnam's first ever nuclear power plant unit (estimated completion - 2020). The Japanese consortium - JINED will construct the second site - 4 X 1000 MW Ninh Thuận 2 at Ninh Hải district.

In March 2012, an intergovernmental pact was signed between Vietnam and South Korea, to start a one-year feasibility study for the construction of four Korean-developed APR-1400 nuclear reactors, additional to the NPPs signed with Russia and Japan. It practically clinched the South Korean consortium as the preferred bidder; however, an official deal will be signed only after approval from the Vietnamese parliament.

The 1 GW reactor unit no. 1 at Ninh Thuận 1, will be commissioned and connected to the national grid by 2020, which at that time will represent 1.5% of the projected total output of 52 GW. In June 2010, Vietnam announced that it plans to build 14 nuclear reactors at eight sites in five provinces by 2030, to satisfy at least 15 GW nuclear power (i.e. 10% share) of the estimated total demand of 112 GW. An ambitious strategy to increase the nuclear share to 20-25% by 2050 has also been outlined.

The nuclear power plant sites in Vietnam would have been operated by the state electricity utility company - EVN.

== History ==
=== 1958 till 1975 ===
Vietnam's aspiration to harness nuclear energy for electricity generation and uses in areas such as medicine and agriculture, dates back to 1958, when South Vietnam - one of the first nations under the Atoms for Peace program, ordered a small research reactor, the General Atomics-built TRIGA-Mark II.

In 1963, the Dalat Nuclear Research Institute, which houses Vietnam's nuclear research reactor, began operating with US assistance. The Second Indochina War interrupted Vietnam's development plans and during that war, the United States dismantled the U.S.-supplied Triga reactor.

=== 1975 till 2006 ===
Immediately after the war, the reunified nation began to rebuild its infrastructure and governmental agencies, establishing the Vietnam Atomic Energy Commission (VAEC) (now the Vietnam Atomic Energy Institute, VAEI) in 1976, under the management of the Ministry of Science and Technology (MOST).

The VAEC was tasked with pursuing a national programme for application of Nuclear Energy to Socio-Economy Sectors of Vietnam. In 1982 the Dalat research reactor reconstruction and expansion project began under the management of the VAEC with assistance from the Soviet Union and IAEA support. On March 20, 1984 the reactor was officially put into operation with a nominal power of 500 kW, twice that of the previous TRIGA reactor.

In the early 1980s, two preliminary nuclear power studies were undertaken, followed by another which stated in 1995 that: "Around the year 2015, when electricity demand reaches more than 100 billion kWh, nuclear power should be introduced for satisfying the continuous growth in the country's electricity demand in that time and beyond".

The race to diversify beyond its primarily hydropower and coal energy mix intensified, when the country's energy demand projections were estimated to increase annually by 16% from 16 GW (2010) to 30 GW (2015). The challenges it faced in identifying new suitable hydro power project sites and inefficient running of the current hydropower facilities due to unfavorable weather conditions, furthered its cause to harness nuclear energy for power generation.

=== 2006 to 2016 ===
In 2006, firm proposals surfaced and the Vietnamese government announced that a 2000 MWe nuclear power plant should be on line by 2020. This general target was confirmed in a nuclear power development plan approved by the government in August 2007, with the target being raised to a total of 8000 MWe nuclear by 2025. A general law on nuclear energy was passed in mid 2008, and plans for developing a comprehensive legal and regulatory framework envisaged.

In October 2008, two major locations in Ninh Thuận Province, namely Phuoc Dinh and Vinh Hai, were confirmed by the Vietnamese government as the sites to implement its first ever nuclear power projects, with 2 X 1000 MW reactors units on each site, totalling nearly 4 GW of power output

In June 2010, Vietnam announced that it plans to build 14 nuclear reactors at eight sites in five provinces by 2030, to satisfy at least 15 GW nuclear power (i.e. 10% share) of the estimated total demand of 112 GW. Four more units were added to the first two sites in Ninh Thuận, then six more at six sites, namely Binh Tien (Ninh Thuận Province), Xuan Phuong (Phú Yên Province), Hoai My (Bình Định Province), Duc Thang (Quảng Ngãi Province), Duc Chanh (Quảng Ngãi Province), and Ky Xuan (Hà Tĩnh Province).

In October 2010, Vietnam signed an inter-governmental agreement with Russia for the construction of the country's first nuclear power plant - Ninh Thuận 1 at Phuoc Dinh, using two VVER-1000 or 1200 reactors (increased later by two more units). The 4 X 1000 MW Ninh Thuận 1 site, will be built by Atomstroyexport, a subsidiary of Rosatom. The construction is due to start by 2014 and the first unit to be commissioned and connected to the national grid by 2020. Russia's Ministry of Finance will finance Vietnam, at least 85% of the first plant and in November 2011, an agreement for a $8 billion loan was signed with the Russian government's state export credit bureau. An intergovernmental agreement was also signed to establish a nuclear science and technology center in Vietnam.

On the same day in October 2010, an intergovernmental agreement with Japan was signed for construction of a second nuclear power plant – Ninh Thuận 2 at Vinh Hai in Ninh Thuận Province, with its two reactors to come on line in 2024–25. The Japanese consortium - International Nuclear Energy Development of Japan Co. Ltd. (JINED) will construct the 4 X 1000 MW Ninh Thuận 2 site. The Japanese Ministry of Economy, Trade and Industry (METI), confirmed the financing and insurance of up to 85% of the total cost.

Aside from the currently involved Atomstroyexport (Russia) and JINED (Japan), Westinghouse (Japan/US), GE (US), EDF (France), KEPCO (South Korea), and CGNPC (China), have all expressed strong interest in constructing the future nuclear power projects outlined, as part of an ambitious strategy to increase the nuclear share to 20-25% by 2050.

In March 2012, it was announced that South Korea and Vietnam will start a one-year feasibility study for the construction of four Korean-developed APR-1400 nuclear reactors, additional to the NPP's signed with Russia and Japan. The intergovernmental pact signed between Vietnamese Prime Minister Nguyen Tan Dung and South Korean President Lee Myung-bak, practically clinched the South Korean consortium as the preferred bidder. However, an official deal will only be signed after approval from the Vietnamese parliament.

Vietnam is planning to send 2,000 workers and engineers to the Russian Federation and Japan for 2–3 years training in nuclear power construction, starting in 2013.

However, in January 2014 it was reported that Vietnam had decided to delay construction by six years, to permit improved safety and efficiency in the plants.

=== 2016 cancellation ===
In November 2016 Vietnam decided to abandon nuclear power plans as they were considered "not economically viable because of other cheaper sources of power", by the Vietnamese government. The Ninh Thuận price had risen from 4 to 8 US cents per kWh, reflecting a project cost of VND400 trillion (US$18 billion) or higher. With a public debt at around 65% of gross domestic product, Vietnam would struggle to finance the plants.

=== 2024 nuclear revival ===
In a meeting with the Director General of Russia’s Rosatom State Atomic Energy Corporation, in June of 2024, Vietnam’s Prime Minister said the country would consider nuclear energy as a means of meeting its net-zero by 2050 commitment. Shortly thereafter, Russia’s Rosatom State Nuclear Energy Corporation and Vietnam’s Ministry of Science and Technology went on signed a memorandum of understanding with respect to jointly establishing a Nuclear Science and Technology Center in Vietnam with a Russian nuclear reactor in Vietnam.

On 23 March 2026, an intergovernmental agreement was signed with Russia for Rosatom to build two VVER‑1200 reactors at Ninh Thuan 1, using the new units at the Leningrad II Nuclear Power Plant for reference.

== List of planned nuclear power plants ==
The nuclear power plants planned, prior to the 2016 cancellation, would have been operated by the state electricity utility company - EVN. The list of planned NPPs were as follows:

| Power plant-Unit | Site Location | Province | Type | Total capacity (MW) | Start construction | First criticality | Commercial operation | Reactor supplier | Construction | Fuel |
|---|---|---|---|---|---|---|---|---|---|---|
| Ninh Thuận 1-1 | Phuoc Dinh | Ninh Thuận | VVER | 1000 | 2014 | - | 2020 | - | Atomstroyexport | - |
| Ninh Thuận 1-2 | Phuoc Dinh | Ninh Thuận | VVER | 1000 | - | - | 2021 | - | Atomstroyexport | - |
| Ninh Thuận 1-3 | Phuoc Dinh | Ninh Thuận | VVER | 1000 | - | - | 2023 | - | - | - |
| Ninh Thuận 1-4 | Phuoc Dinh | Ninh Thuận | VVER | 1000 | - | - | 2024 | - | - | - |
| Ninh Thuận 2-1 | Vinh Hai | Ninh Thuận | Japanese Gen III | 1000 | 2015 | - | 2021 | - | JINED | - |
| Ninh Thuận 2-2 | Vinh Hai | Ninh Thuận | Japanese Gen III | 1000 | - | - | 2022 | - | JINED | - |
| Ninh Thuận 2-3 | Vinh Hai | Ninh Thuận | Japanese Gen III | 1000 | - | - | 2024 | - | - | - |
| Ninh Thuận 2-4 | Vinh Hai | Ninh Thuận | Japanese Gen III | 1000 | - | - | 2025 | - | - | - |
| Total | | | | 8000 | | | | | | |

== See also ==
- Nuclear energy policy by country - Vietnam
- List of nuclear reactors - Vietnam
