= Japan Atomic Power Company =

- Company type: Private company
- Genre: Power Generation
- Founded: 1957
- Headquarters: Tokyo, Japan
- Revenue: ¥156,811 million (2006)
- Total assets: ¥625,400 million
- Website: www.japc.co.jp

The Japan Atomic Power Company (日本原子力発電, Nihon Genshiryoku Hatsuden; JAPC) is a company initially formed to jump start the commercial use of nuclear power in Japan, and currently operates two different sites. According to the official web site, JAPC is "the only power company in Japan solely engaged in nuclear energy".

JAPC owns both units at the Tōkai Nuclear Power Plant and the Tsuruga Nuclear Power Plant with plans to expand at Tsuruga.

The company is jointly owned by Japan's major electric utilities: The Tokyo Electric Power Company (28.23%), Kansai Electric Power (18.54%), Chubu Electric Power (15.12%), Hokuriku Electric Power Company (13.05%), Tohoku Electric Power (6.12%), and Electric Power Development Company (J-Power) (5.37%).

== Accidents ==
On 11 March 2011 several nuclear reactors in Japan were badly damaged by the 2011 Tōhoku earthquake and tsunami. The Tōkai Nuclear Power Plant lost external electric power, experienced the failure of one of its two cooling pumps, and two of its three emergency power generators. External electric power could only be restored two days after the earthquake.

== Selling uranium stock ==
In February 2013 in an attempt to raise money to be able to pay back loans due in April 2013, Japan Atomic Power did sell part of its uranium-stock. Streamlining and selling the uranium would be needed to pay back 40 billion yen. After April 2013 the major shareholders were expected to guarantee the payments for some 100 billion yen in loans. Japan Atomic Power refused to disclose the buyer.

== Activities abroad ==
Japan's first nuclear activity in a previously non-nuclear country was to be four 1000 MW reactors at Ninh Thuận 2 Nuclear Power Plant. The feasibility study was to be carried out by Japan Atomic Power Company. Japan Atomic Power Company were also to consult the project. The plant was to be built by a consortium, International Nuclear Energy Development of Japan Co, which comprises 13 Japanese companies. The plant was to be owned and operated by state-owned electricity company EVN.

Unit 1 was expected to be commissioned in 2021, unit 2 in 2022, unit 3 in 2024 and unit 4 in 2025. However, the project was suspended in 2016, and in 2023, the provincial government returned the land-use rights to the families who previously owned them.
