= Ninh Thuận 2 Nuclear Power Plant =

Cancelled nuclear power station in Vietnam

- Country: Vietnam
- Location: Vĩnh Hải Commune, Khánh Hòa Province
- Coordinates: 11°41′26″N 109°10′31″E
- Status: Planned
- Owner: Petrovietnam
- Operator: Petrovietnam

Power generation
- Units planned: 2 x 1,000 MWe
- Nameplate capacity: ~2000 MWe

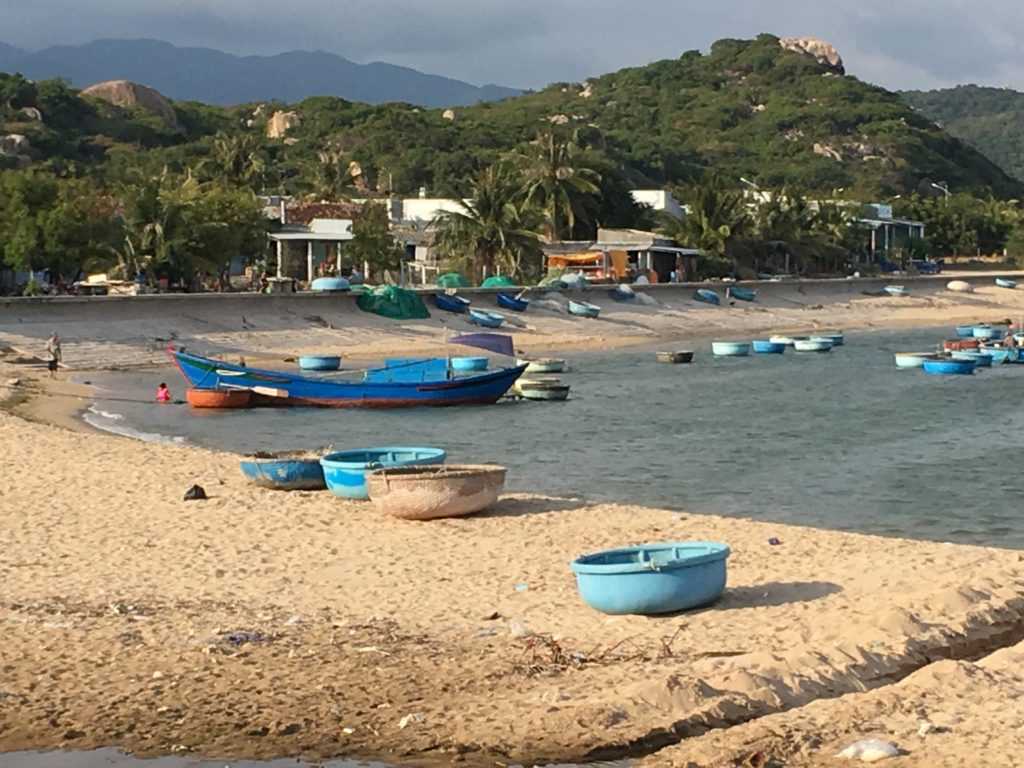
The fishing village of Tay An, which was the planned site of the power plant.

The Ninh Thuận 2 Nuclear Power Plant is a nuclear power plant at Vĩnh Hải Commune, Khánh Hòa Province, Vietnam. It was initially projected to consist of four 1,000 MWe reactors.

The feasibility study was to be carried out by Japan Atomic Power Company. Japan Atomic Power Company will also consult the project. The plant will be built by a consortium, International Nuclear Energy Development of Japan Co, which comprises 13 Japanese companies. The plant was to be owned and operated by state-owned electricity company EVN. Unit 1 was expected to be commissioned in 2021, unit 2 in 2022, unit 3 in 2024 and unit 4 in 2025. A marine geological survey for preparations of construction was carried out by the Japan-based Kawasaki Geological Survey Company at the ship M.T. Chōyō.

However, in 2014, the Prime Minister Nguyễn Tấn Dũng announced that the construction would be postponed until 2020 to ensure the highest degree of safety. A decade later, in 2024, the National Assembly of Vietnam approved the revival of the nuclear power program in Ninh Thuận, largely as continuation of the frozen project.

In 2025, the Government of Vietnam assigned Petrovietnam as the investor and future owner-operator of Ninh Thuận 2.

== See also ==
- Nuclear energy in Vietnam
- Nuclear energy policy by country - Vietnam
- List of nuclear reactors - Vietnam
- Ninh Thuận 1 Nuclear Power Plant
