= Hokuriku Electric Power Company =

Japanese electric utility company

The Hokuriku Electric Power Company

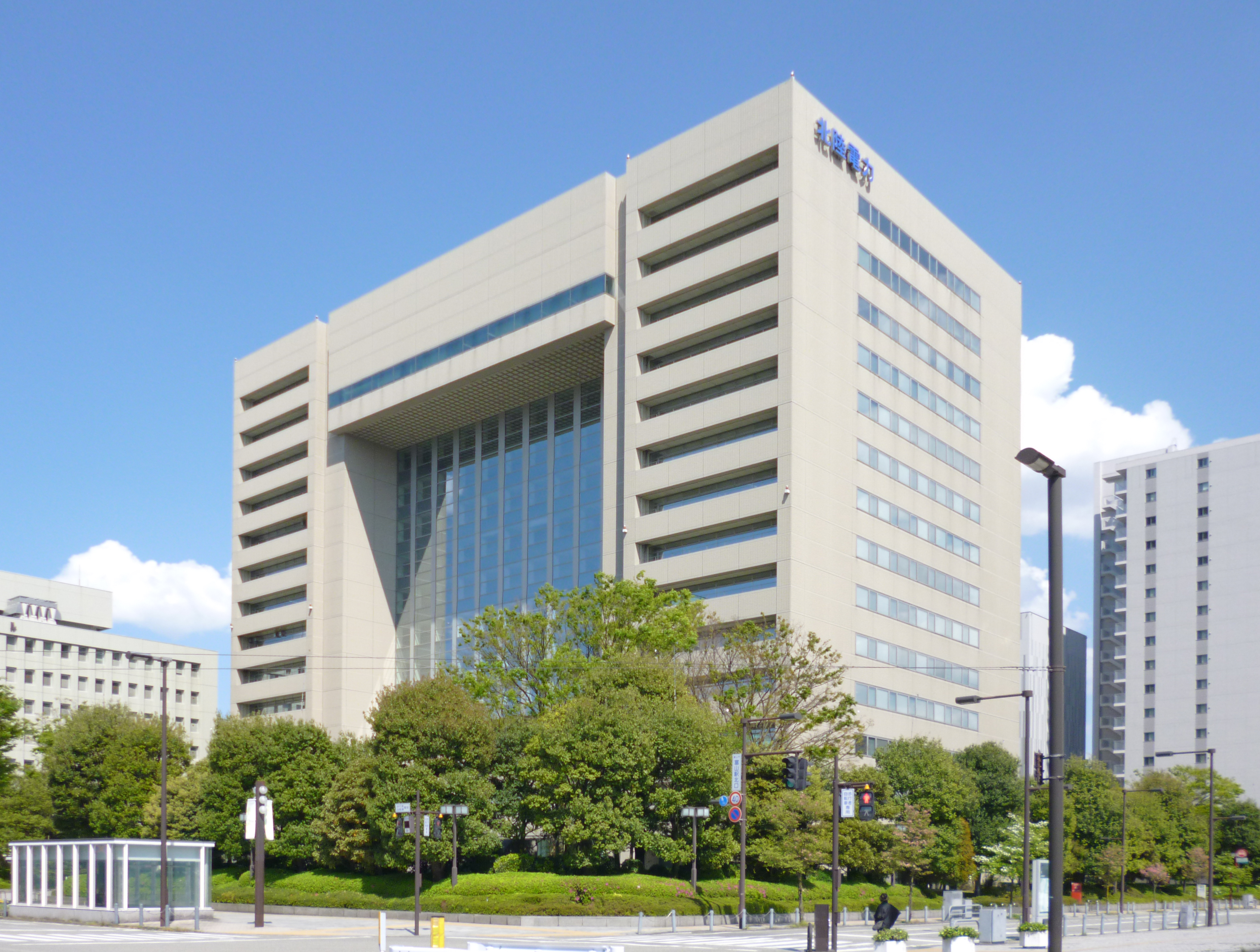
- The headquarters in Toyama, Toyama, Japan
- Native name: 北陸電力株式会社
- Company type: Public KK
- Traded as: TYO: 9505
- Industry: Energy
- Founded: May 1, 1951
- Headquarters: Toyama, Toyama, Japan
- Area served: Toyama, Ishikawa and part of Fukui, Gifu Prefectures
- Key people: Hidenori Mugino (Chairman); Eishin Ihori (President)
- Products: Natural gas production, sale and distribution, electricity generation and distribution, hydroelectricity, wind power, energy trading
- Revenue: ▲¥542,572 million (FY, 2016, consolidated)
- Operating income: ▲¥2,012 million (FY, 2016, consolidated)
- Net income: ▼¥622 million (FY, 2016, consolidated)
- Total assets: ▲¥1,518,076 million (FY, 2016, consolidated)
- Total equity: ▲¥327,614 million (FY, 2016, consolidated)
- Number of employees: 8,299 (March 2015, consolidated)
- Website: www.rikuden.co.jp

The Hokuriku Electric Power Company 北陸電力 (Hokuriku Denryoku) supplies power by a regulated monopoly to Toyama Prefecture, Ishikawa Prefecture, the northern part of Fukui Prefecture, and northwestern parts of Gifu Prefecture. It is often abbreviated 北電 (Hokuden) within its area of service, but out of that area the name can also refer to the Hokkaidō Electric Power Company so it is also shortened to 陸電 (Rikuden).

Their headquarters are in Toyama, Toyama. Recently, Kei Takahara was adopted as their image character. They have also launched a campaign called 電気DE元気 (Denki DE Genki).

== Fuel mix ==
In 2011 Rikuden's power generating mix in percentage of total output was as follows:

- Coal: 62%
- Hydro: 26%
- Oil: 10%
- Nuclear: 1%
- Renewables: 1%

== Power Stations ==
In 2011 Rikuden had a total generating capacity of 8,058 MW (9,185 MW, including purchased or contracted capacity).

=== Thermal power stations ===
Rikuden has 4,400 MW of generating capacity through its thermal generating stations through 6 fossil fuels powered stations.

- Fukui Thermal Power Station - 250 MW (Unit 1 stopped in 2004)
- Nanao Ota Thermal Power Station - 1,200 MW
- Toyama Thermal Power Station - 250 MW (Unit 2 stopped in 2001 and units 1 and 3 stopped in 2004)
- Toyama II - 1,500 MW
- Tsuruga Thermal Power Station - 1,200 MW

=== Hydroelectric ===
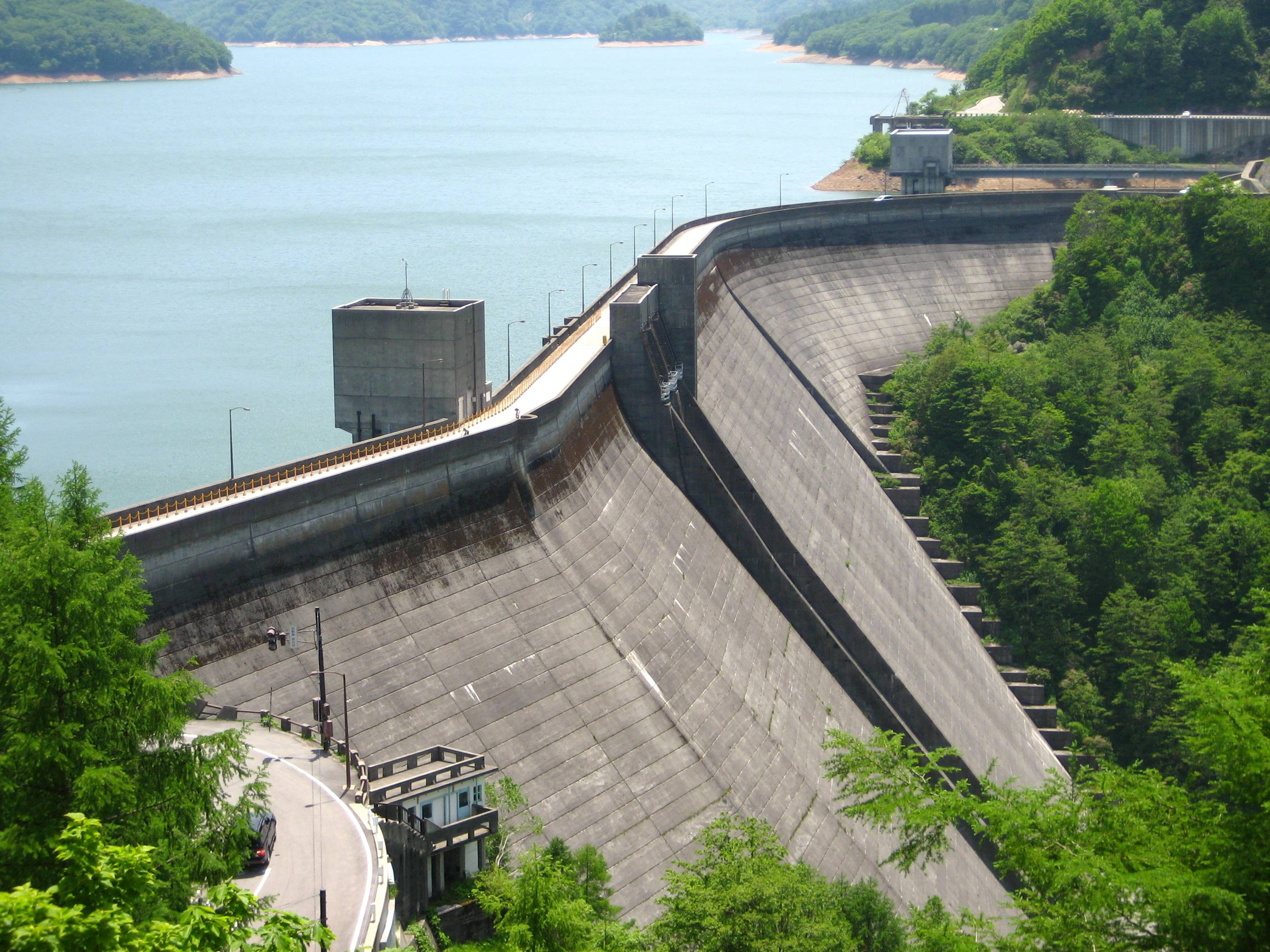
The Arimine Dam

Rikuden has 1,905 MW of hydroelectric capacity through 128 separate generating stations.

- Arimine I - 265 MW
  - Arimine II - 120 MW
  - Wada II - 122 MW
- Jindsugawa I - 82 MW
  - Jindsugawa II - 40 MW
- more

=== Nuclear Power Plants ===
Rikuden generates 1,746 MW of electricity from nuclear power.

- Shika Nuclear Power Plant
- Tōkai Nuclear Power Plant - part-owned through Japan Atomic Power Company
- Tsuruga Nuclear Power Plant - also part-owned through Japan Atomic Power Company

=== Renewables ===
Rikuden generates 7 MW electricity from renewable sources at 5 sites.

== See also ==
- Nuclear power in Japan
