= Tokyo Electric Power Company =

Japanese electric utility holding company

Tokyo Electric Power Company Holdings, Incorporated

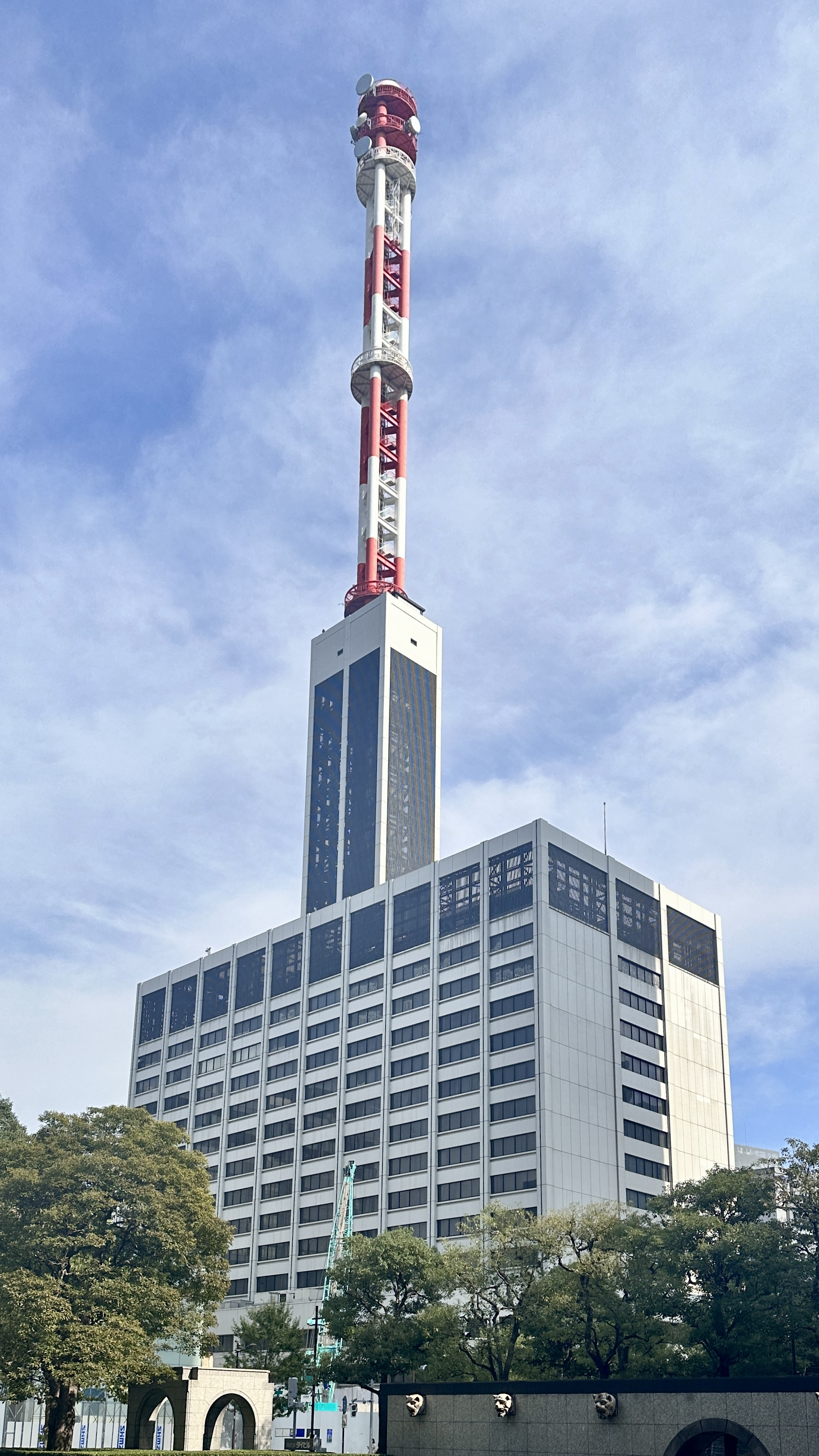
- Headquarters in Chiyoda, Tokyo
- Native name: 東京電力ホールディングス株式会社
- Romanized name: Tōkyō Denryoku Hōrudingusu kabushiki gaisha
- Formerly: Tokyo Electric Power Company, Incorporated (1951-2016)
- Type: Public KK
- Traded as: TYO: 9501
- Industry: Electric utility
- Predecessor: The Tokyo Electric Light Company, Inc. (founded in 1883)
- Founded: May 1, 1951; 75 years ago
- Headquarters: Uchisaiwaichō, Chiyoda, Tokyo, Japan
- Area served: Tokyo, Kanagawa, Saitama, Chiba, Tochigi, Gunma, Ibaraki, Yamanashi, and east Shizuoka
- Key people: Yoshimitsu Kobayashi (Chairman); Tomoaki Kobayakawa (President)
- Services: Electric generation, transmission, and distribution
- Revenue: ▲¥6.85 trillion (US$62.37 billion) (FY2026)
- Operating income: ▲¥288.7 billion (US$2.63 billion) (FY2026)
- Net income: ▲¥245.1 billion (US$2.23 billion) (FY2026)
- Total assets: ▲¥14.18 trillion (US$129.21 billion) (FY2026)
- Total equity: ▲¥3.62 trillion (US$32.99 billion) (FY2026)
- Owner: Government of Japan, through the Nuclear Damage Compensation and Decommissioning Facilitation Corporation (54.74%); TMTBJ investment trusts (6.28%); CBJ investment trusts (1.77%); ESOP (1.50%); Tokyo Metropolitan Government (1.20%); SMBC (1.01%)
- Number of employees: 38,100 (2026)
- Subsidiaries: TEPCO Power Grid; TEPCO Fuel & Power; TEPCO Energy Partner; Tokyo Electric Generation Company
- Website: www.tepco.co.jp

Tokyo Electric Power Company Holdings, Incorporated (Japanese: 東京電力ホールディングス株式会社, Tōkyōdenryoku Hōrudingusu Kabushikigaisha; TEPCO, also known as Tōden (東電) in Japan) is a Japanese electric utility holding company servicing Japan's Kantō region, Yamanashi Prefecture, and the eastern portion of Shizuoka Prefecture. This area includes Tokyo. Its headquarters are located in Uchisaiwaicho, Chiyoda, Tokyo, and international branch offices exist in Washington, D.C., and London. It is a founding member of strategic consortiums related to energy innovation and research; such as JINED, INCJ and MAI.

In 2007, TEPCO was forced to shut the Kashiwazaki-Kariwa Nuclear Power Plant after the Niigata-Chuetsu-Oki earthquake. That year, it posted its first loss in 28 years. Corporate losses continued until the plant reopened in 2009. Following the 2011 Tōhoku earthquake and tsunami, one of its power plants was the site of one of the world's most serious nuclear accidents, the Fukushima Daiichi nuclear disaster. TEPCO could face ¥2 trillion (US$23.6 billion) in special losses in the current business year to March 2012, and the Japanese government plans to put TEPCO under effective state control to guarantee compensation payments to the people affected by the accident. The Fukushima disaster displaced 50,000 households in the evacuation zone because of leaks of radioactive materials into the air, soil and sea.

In July 2012, TEPCO received ¥1 trillion (US$12 billion) from the Japanese government in order to prevent collapse of the company to ensure electricity is still being supplied to Tokyo and its surrounding municipalities, and decommission the Fukushima Daiichi Nuclear Power Plant. TEPCO's management subsequently made a proposal to its shareholders for the company to be part-nationalized. The Nuclear Damage Compensation and Decommissioning Facilitation Corporation later became the majority stockholder to oversee the damages and decommissioning of the power plant. The total cost of the disaster was estimated at $100 billion in May 2012.

== History ==
TEPCO logo, in use from 1987 to March 2016

Japan's electricity sector, nationalized in 1939 in preparation of total war (the Pacific War), were privatized in 1951 on behest of the U.S./Allied occupation forces, creating nine privately owned government-granted monopolies, one in a certain region; this included TEPCO. Tokyo Electric Power Co., Inc. was established by reorganizing Kanto Haiden and Nippon Shuden, which were established through wartime integration.

In the 1950s, the company's primary goal was to facilitate a rapid recovery from the infrastructure devastation of World War II. After the recovery period, the company had to expand its supply capacity to catch up with the country's rapid economic growth by developing fossil fuel power plants and a more efficient transmission network.

In the 1960s and 1970s, the company faced the challenges of increased environmental pollution and oil shocks. TEPCO began addressing environmental concerns through expansion of its LNG fueled power plant network as well as greater reliance on nuclear power generation. The first nuclear unit at the Fukushima Dai-ichi (Fukushima I) nuclear power plant began operational generation on March 26, 1971.

During the 1980s and 1990s, the widespread use of air-conditioners and IT/OA appliances resulted a gap between day and night electricity demand. In order to reduce surplus generation capacity and increase capacity utilization, TEPCO developed pumped storage hydroelectric power plants and promoted thermal storage units.

Recently, TEPCO is expected to play a key role in achieving Japan's targets for reduced carbon dioxide emissions under the Kyoto Protocol. It also faces difficulties related to the trend towards deregulation in Japan's electric industry as well as low power demand growth. In light of these circumstances, TEPCO launched an extensive sales promotion campaign called 'Switch!', promoting all-electric housing in order to both achieve the more efficient use of its generation capacity as well as erode the market share of gas companies.

== Major subsidiaries ==
As Tokyo Electric Power Company Holdings, Inc. is a holding company, there are several major wholly owned subsidiaries.

- TEPCO Power Grid – Responsible for managing power grid around Kantō region and transmits and distributes electricity between electricity wholesaler and retailer.
- TEPCO Energy Partner – Electricity retailer operating under "TEPCO" brand throughout Japan, except Okinawa.
- TEPCO Fuel & Power – Operates fossil fuel power stations mainly for TEPCO Energy Partner.
- Tokyo Electric Generation Company – Generates wholesale electricity for electricity market.
- Tokyo Electric Power Services Co. Ltd (TEPSCO) – Provides consulting services for electric power industry.

== Corporate overview ==
- Capital stock: ¥676,424,197,050
- Total outstanding shares: 1,352,876,531
- Number of shareholders: 821,841
- Electricity sales (FY 2004): 92,592 million kWh (lighting), 194,148 million kWh (power), 286,741 million kWh (total)
- Peak demand: 64.3 million kW (July 24, 2001)
- Number of customers (ending March 31, 2005): 25,120,000 / 83.89 million kW (lighting), 2,630,000 thousand / 39.75 million kWh (power), 27,740,000 / 123.64 million kW (total)
- Revenue from electricity sales: ¥4,637.2 billion yen (FY 2004)

== Ownership ==
In March 2010, the last year before 2011 Fukushima nuclear disaster, TEPCO listed 10 entities as its major shareholders, amounting to 27.35% of all shares. Five of the ten were Japanese banks, two were Japanese insurance companies, the remaining two were Tokyo Metropolitan Government and a group of TEPCO employees. The largest shareholder was Japan Trustee Services Bank (4.47%).

On April 11, 2012 TEPCO announced that the Tokyo Metropolitan Government had temporarily become the largest shareholder of the firm with 9.37 percent voting rights, after former largest share holders Dai-ichi Life Nippon Life Insurance Co. and Nippon Life Insurance Co. had sold their 3.42 and 3.29 percent stakes in the company. The two life insurance companies had lost their interest in TEPCO after the shares had lost almost all their value at the stock market. At the next shareholders meeting of TEPCO in June 2012, Tokyo hoped to put a halt to TEPCO's plans raising the price of electricity. This position was changed by later ownership changes.

=== Community compensation ===
Tokyo Electric Power could face 2 trillion yen ($23.6 bln) in special losses in the current business year to March 2012 to compensate communities near its crippled Fukushima nuclear plant, according to JP Morgan. The company secured additional public funds through a government-backed entity to support ongoing compensation payments related to the Fukushima Daiichi nuclear disaster, as well as to address long-term cleanup and decommissioning costs.

== Salary pay cuts ==
The company workers agreed to a management proposal to cut their pay as a sense of responsibility for the world's worst nuclear disaster. Annual remuneration for board members would be reduced by 50 percent since April 2011, while payment for managers would be cut by 25 percent and workers by 20 percent both since July 2011 and bonuses since June 2011. The company expects to save about 54 billion yen ($659 million) a year from the pay cuts.

In July 2012, it was announced that annual salaries of managers would be reduced by at least 30%, with workers pay cut remaining at 20%. On average employees pay would be cut by 23.68%. In addition, the portion of the employee health insurance program that the company covers would be reduced from 60% to 50%, the standard in Japan.

== Power stations and generation capacity ==
- Hydro: 160 / 8,521.0 MW
- Thermal (oil, coal, LN(P)G, geothermal): 26 / 36,995.0 MW
- Nuclear: 3 / 17,308.0 MW
- Wind: 1 / 1.0 MW
- Total: 190 / 62,825.0 MW

=== Position in the industry ===
TEPCO is the largest electric utility in Japan and the 4th largest electric utility in the world after German RWE, French Électricité de France and Germany's E.ON. As TEPCO stands in a leading position in this industry, they have relatively a strong effect for Japanese economics, environment, and energy industry.

=== Management and finance ===
For the fiscal years ending in 2011, 2012 the company had a pretax loss, in 2013 the deficit was 377.6 billion yen. In the following year 2014 red figures were expected too.

=== Generation ===
The company's power generation consists of two main networks. Fossil fuel power plants around Tokyo Bay are used for peak load supply and nuclear reactors in Fukushima and Niigata Prefecture provide base load supply. Additionally, hydroelectric plants in the mountainous areas outside the Kanto Plain, despite their relatively small capacity compared to fossil fuel and nuclear generation, remain important in providing peak load supply. The company also purchases electricity from other regional or wholesale electric power companies like Tohoku Electric Power, J-POWER, and Japan Atomic Power Company.

In May 2025, the Tsumagoi Battery Storage Station, a 2.0 MW / 9.3 MWh grid-connected battery developed by a joint venture between TEPCO and NTT Anode Energy, began commercial operation in Gunma Prefecture.

=== Transmission and distribution ===
The company has built a radiated and circular grid between power plants and urban/industrial demand areas. Each transmission line is designed to transmit electricity at high-voltage (66-500kV) between power plants and substations. Normally transmission lines are strung between towers, but within the Tokyo metropolitan area high-voltage lines are located underground.

From substations, electricity is transmitted via the distribution grid at low-voltage (22-66kV). For high-voltage supply to large buildings and factories, distribution lines are directly connected to customers' electricity systems. In this case, customers must purchase and set up transformers and other equipment to run electric appliances. For low voltage supply to houses and small shops, distribution lines are first connected to the company's transformers (seen on utility poles and utility boxes), converted to 100/200V, and finally connected to end users.

Under normal conditions, TEPCO's transmission and distribution infrastructure is notable as one of the most reliable electricity networks in the world. Blackout frequency and average recovery time compares favorably with other electric companies in Japan as well as within other developed countries. The company instituted its first-ever rolling blackouts following the shutdown of the Fukushima I and II plants which were close to the epicenter of the March 2011 earthquake. For example, on the morning of Tuesday, March 15, 2011, 700,000 households had no power for three hours. The company had to deal with a 10 million kW gap between demand and production on March 14, 2011.

Three TEPCO aerial work platform trucks work together on utility poles, upgrading overhead power lines in Tokyo, Japan (video).

== Accidents and controversies ==
=== Safety incidents ===
On August 29, 2002, the government of Japan revealed that TEPCO was guilty of false reporting in routine governmental inspection of its nuclear plants and systematic concealment of plant safety incidents. All seventeen of its boiling-water reactors were shut down for inspection as a result. TEPCO's chairman Hiroshi Araki, President Nobuya Minami, Vice-President Toshiaki Enomoto, as well as the advisers Shō Nasu and Gaishi Hiraiwa stepped-down by September 30, 2002. The utility "eventually admitted to two hundred occasions over more than two decades between 1977 and 2002, involving the submission of false technical data to authorities". Upon taking over leadership responsibilities, TEPCO's new president issued a public commitment that the company would take all the countermeasures necessary to prevent fraud and restore the nation's confidence. By the end of 2005, generation at suspended plants had been restarted, with government approval.

In 2007, however, the company announced to the public that an internal investigation had revealed a large number of unreported incidents. These included an unexpected unit criticality in 1978 and additional systematic false reporting, which had not been uncovered during the 2002 inquiry. Along with scandals at other Japanese electric companies, this failure to ensure corporate compliance resulted in strong public criticism of Japan's electric power industry and the nation's nuclear energy policy. Again, the company made no effort to identify those responsible.

=== 2008 Kashiwazaki-Kariwa shutdown ===
In 2008, Tokyo Electric was forced to shut down the Kashiwazaki-Kariwa Nuclear Power Plant following the 2007 Chūetsu offshore earthquake. To meet demand, the company purchased electricity from competitors and restarted thermal power plants, resulting in significant additional oil and gas consumption. These activities caused the company to post its first loss in 28 years.

=== 2011 Fukushima nuclear disaster ===
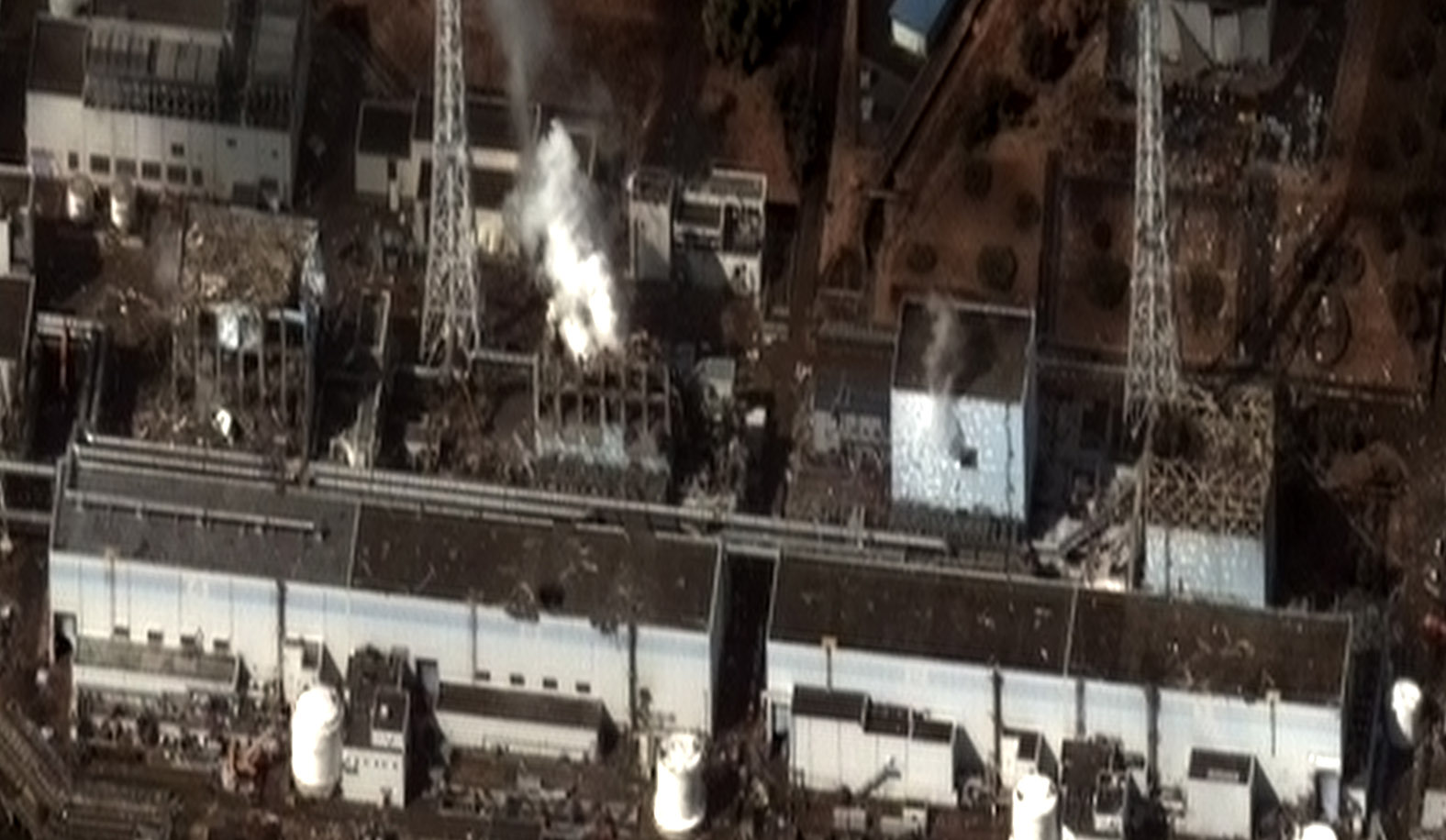
Three of the reactors at Fukushima I overheated, causing meltdowns that eventually led to explosions, which released large amounts of radioactive material into the air.

On March 11, 2011, several nuclear reactors in Japan were badly damaged by the 2011 Tōhoku earthquake and tsunami.

The Tōkai Nuclear Power Plant lost external electric power, experienced the failure of one of its two cooling pumps, and two of its three emergency power generators. External electric power could only be restored two days after the earthquake.

The Japanese government declared an "atomic power emergency" and evacuated thousands of residents living close to TEPCO's Fukushima I plant. Reactors 4, 5 and 6 had been shut down prior to the earthquake for planned maintenance. The remaining reactors were shut down automatically after the earthquake, but the subsequent tsunami flooded the plant, knocking out emergency generators needed to run pumps which cool and control the reactors. The flooding and earthquake damage prevented assistance being brought from elsewhere. Over the following days there was evidence of partial nuclear meltdowns in reactors 1, 2 and 3; hydrogen explosions destroyed the upper cladding of the building housing reactors 1 and 3; an explosion damaged reactor 2's containment; and severe fires broke out at reactor 4.

The Fukushima nuclear disaster revealed the dangers of building multiple nuclear reactor units close to one another. This proximity triggered the parallel, chain-reaction accidents that led to hydrogen explosions blowing the roofs off reactor buildings and water draining from open-air spent fuel pools—a situation that was potentially more dangerous than the loss of reactor cooling itself. Because of the proximity of the reactors, Plant Director Masao Yoshida "was put in the position of trying to cope simultaneously with core meltdowns at three reactors and exposed fuel pools at three units".

The Japanese authorities rated the events at reactors 1, 2 and 3 as a level 5 (Accident With Wider Consequences) on the International Nuclear Event Scale, while the events at reactor 4 were placed at level 3 (Serious Incident). The situation as a whole was rated as level 7 (Major Accident). On March 20, Japan's chief cabinet secretary Yukio Edano "confirmed for the first time that the nuclear complex — with heavy damage to reactors and buildings and with radioactive contamination throughout — would be closed once the crisis was over." At the same time, questions are being asked, looking back, about whether company management waited too long before pumping seawater into the plant, a measure that would ruin and has now ruined the reactors; and, looking forward, "whether time is working for or against the workers and soldiers struggling to re-establish cooling at the crippled plant." One report noted that defense minister, Toshimi Kitazawa, on March 21 had committed "military firefighters to spray water around the clock on an overheated storage pool at Reactor No. 3." The report concluded with "a senior nuclear executive who insisted on anonymity but has many contacts in Japan sa[ying that] ... caution ... [as] plant operators have been struggling to reduce workers’ risk ... had increased the risk of a serious accident. He suggested that Japan's military assume primary responsibility. 'It's the same trade-off you have to make in war, and that is the sacrifice of a few for the safety of many,' he said. 'But a corporation just cannot do that.'"

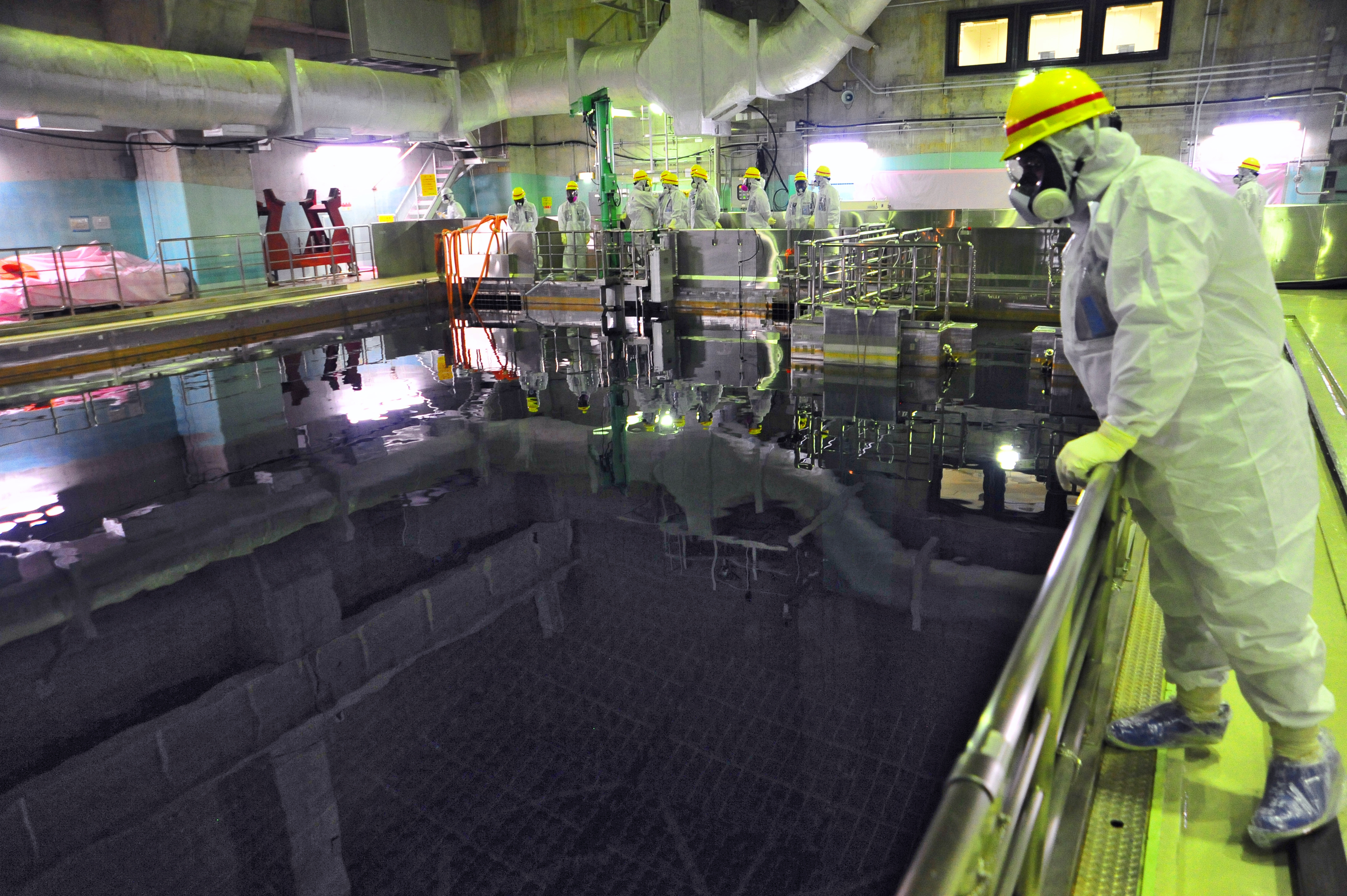
Spent nuclear fuel pool at TEPCO's Fukushima Daiichi Nuclear Power Plant on 27 November 2013

There has been considerable criticism to the way TEPCO handled the crisis. It was reported that seawater was used only after Prime Minister Naoto Kan ordered it following an explosion at one reactor the evening of March 12, though executives had started considering it that morning. TEPCO didn't begin using seawater at other reactors until March 13. Referring to that same early decision-making sequence, "Michael Friedlander, a former senior operator at a Pennsylvania power plant with General Electric reactors similar to the troubled ones in Japan, said the crucial question is whether Japanese officials followed G.E.’s emergency operating procedures." Kuni Yogo, a former atomic energy policy planner in Japan's Science and Technology Agency and Akira Omoto, a former TEPCO executive and a member of the Japanese Atomic Energy Commission both questioned TEPCO's management's decisions in the crisis. Kazuma Yokota, a safety inspector with Japan's Nuclear and Industrial Safety Agency, or NISA, was at Fukushima I at the time of the earthquake and tsunami and provided details of the early progression of the crisis.

The Fukushima disaster displaced 50,000 households in the evacuation zone because of radioactivity releases into the air, soil and sea. In 2012, it was reported that 8.5 tonnes of radioactive water had leaked from Fukushima Daiichi No.4.

In June 2012, TEPCO revealed, that in 2006 and 2008 TEPCO employees made two studies in which the effect of tsunami-waves higher than the "official" expected height of 5.7 meters was studied on the performance of the reactors. This was done after the large Indian Ocean tsunami in 2004. The conclusion from the simulation in 2006 was that a 13.5 meter wave would cause a complete loss of all power and would make it impossible to inject water into reactor No. 5. The costs to protect the plant for such an event was estimated to be about 25 million dollars. In 2008, the effect of a 10-meter-high tsunami was calculated. TEPCO failed in both cases to take advantage of this knowledge, and nothing was done to prevent such an event to happen, because the study sessions were conducted only as a training for junior employees, and the company did not really expect such large tsunamis.

TEPCO subsequently signed a partnership with French company Areva to treat the contaminated water.

In 2016, three former TEPCO executives, chairman Tsunehisa Katsumata and two vice presidents, were indicted for negligence resulting in death and injury. All were acquitted by the Tokyo District Court on September 19, 2019.

==== Company future ====
On March 30, 2011, the president of TEPCO, Masataka Shimizu, was hospitalized with symptoms of dizziness and high blood pressure in the wake of an increasingly serious outlook for the Fukushima plant and increasing levels of radiation from the stricken plant, as well as media reports of TEPCO's imminent nationalization or bankruptcy triggered by the situation at the Fukushima plant.

On July 31, 2012, TEPCO was substantially nationalized by receiving a capital injection of 1 trillion yen ($12.5bn) from the Nuclear Damage Liability Facilitation Fund (currently Nuclear Damage Compensation and Decommissioning Facilitation Corporation), a government-backed support body. The Fund holds the majority (50.11%) of voting rights with an option to raise that figure to 88.69% by converting preferred stocks into common stocks. This Japan's biggest utility had received by the end of February 2016 at least 5.7609 trillion yen in state support since the tsunami. The total cost of the disaster was estimated at $100bn in May 2012. In April, all Japanese nuclear reactors were closed.

=== Response to the 2022 Russian invasion of Ukraine ===
TEPCO has continued its business operations in Russia, including the purchase of Russian gas despite international sanctions against Russia following its invasion of Ukraine in 2022. Unlike the many international corporations that have scaled back or ceased their activities in Russia, TEPCO has opted to maintain its engagement. Research conducted by the Yale School of Management categorized the company in the "Grade F" tier, labeled "Digging In," which denotes entities that have defied calls to exit or reduce operations in Russia. This decision has drawn criticism for undermining global efforts to isolate Russia economically and exert pressure to end its aggression.

== Offices ==
Name	Location	
Corporate Headquarters	1-1-3 Uchisaiwai-Cho, Chiyoda, Tokyo, Japan	
Tokyo Branch	5-4-9 Shinjuku, Shinjuku, Tokyo	Service offices: Ginza, Koutou, Ueno, Shibuya, Shinjuku, Otsuka, Ogikubo, Shinagawa
Kanagawa Branch	1-1 Benten-Dori, Naka, Yokohama City, Kanagawa	Service offices: Kawasaki, Tsurumi, Yokohama, Fujisawa, Sagamihara, Hiratsuka, Odawara
Chiba Branch	2-9-5 Fujimi, Chuo, Chiba City, Chiba	Service offices: Chiba, Keiyou, Toukatsu, Narita, Kisarazu
Washington, D.C. Office	2121 K Street, NW, Suite 920, Washington D.C.	
London Office	Marlborough Court 14-18 Holborn, London, EC1N 2LE, UK	

== Power plants ==
=== Nuclear ===
Name	Location	Number of units	Generation Capacity (MW)
Fukushima Daiichi Nuclear Power Plant	22 Kitahara, Ottozawa, Okuma Town, Futaba District, Fukushima	6 (of which 3 were damaged beyond repair, 1 with extensive damage and 2 with little damage after the 2011 earthquake and tsunami) +2 (cancelled at paper plan stage)	4,696 (permanently suspended)
Fukushima Daini Nuclear Power Plant	12 Kobamasaku, Namikura, Naraha Town, Futaba District, Fukushima	4 (suspended)	4,400 (idle)
Kashiwazaki-Kariwa Nuclear Power Plant	16-46 Aoyama-cho, Kashiwazaki City, Niigata	7 (1 active, 6 suspended)	7,965 (idle)

In March 2008, Tokyo Electric announced that the start of operation of four new nuclear power reactors would be postponed by one year due to the incorporation of new earthquake resistance assessments. Units 7 and 8 of the Fukushima Daiichi plant would now enter commercial operation in October 2014 and October 2015, respectively. However, following the nuclear crisis of 2011, these plans have been cancelled. According to TEPCO's official regulatory paper, starting operation of Higashidori is expressed as 'Not yet determined'. In January 2026, Unit 6 of Kashiwazaki-Kariwa Nuclear Power Plant was restarted. Unit 7 is expected to be restarted by 2030.

=== Fossil fuel ===
Name	Location	Units	Capacity (MW)
Hirono Power Station	Hirono-Cho, Futaba, Fukushima	5 (operational) + 1 (under construction)	3,800 (operational) + 600(under construction)
Hitachinaka Power Station	768-23 Terunuma, Toukai, Naka, Ibaraki	2 (operational)	2,000 (operational)
Kashima Power Station	9 Higashi-Wada, Kamisu City, Ibaraki	6 (operational) + 1 (under construction)	4,400 (operational) + 1,248(under construction)
Chiba Power Station	Soga-Machi, Chiba City, Chiba	2 (operational) + 1 (under construction)	2,880 (operational) + 1,500(under construction)
Goi Power Station	1 Goi-Kaigan, Ichihara City, Chiba	6 (operational)	1,886 (operational)
Anegasaki Power Station	3 Anegasaki-Kaigan, Ichihara City, Chiba	6 (operational)	3,600 (operational)
Sodegaura Power Station	2-1 Nakasode, Sodegaura City, Chiba	4 (operational)	3,600 (operational)
Futtsu Power Station	25 Shintomi, Futtsu City, Chiba	4 (operational)	5,040 (operational)
Shinagawa Power Station	5-6-22 Higashi-Shinagawa, Shinagawa, Tokyo	1 (operational)	1,140 (operational)
Oi Thermal Power Station	1-2-2 Yashio, Shinagawa, Tokyo	3 (operational)	1,050 (operational)
Kawasaki Power Station	5-1 Chidori-Cho, Kawasaki, Kawasaki City, Kanagawa	1 (operational) + 1 (under construction)	2,000 (operational) + 1,420(under construction)
Higashi Ogishima Power Station	3 Higashi-Ogishima, Kawasaki, Kawasaki City, Kanagawa	2 (operational)	2,000 (operational)
Yokohama Power Station	11-1 Daikoku-Cho, Tsurumi, Yokohama City, Kanagawa	4 (operational)	3,325 (operational)
Minami Yokohama Power Station	37-1 Shin-Isogo-Cho, Isogo, Yokohama City, Kanagawa	3 (operational)	1,150 (operational)
Yokosuka Thermal Power Station	9-2-1 Kurihama, Yokosuka City, Kanagawa	4 (operational) +4 (standby)	874 (operational) + 1,400 (standby)

=== Hydro ===
TEPCO has a total of 160 hydroelectric stations with a total capacity of 8,520 MW. The largest pumped-storage plants are:

- Nagawado Dam (623 MW)
- Shin-Takasegawa Pumped Storage Station (1,280 MW)
- Tamahara Pumped Storage Power Station (1,200 MW)
- Shiobara Pumped Storage Plant (900 MW)
- Imaichi Pumped Storage Plant (1,050 MW)
- Kazunogawa Pumped Storage Power Station (800 MW)
- Kannagawa Hydropower Plant (2,820 MW)

== Electric vehicle batteries and recharging ==
Under the lead of an organization affiliated with the Ministry of Economy, Trade and Industry, the Tokyo Electric Power Company is working out next-gen car battery norms. It has developed a specification for high-voltage DC automotive fast charging using a JARI Level 3 DC connector, and formed the CHΛdeMO (stands for Charge and Move) association with Japanese automakers Mitsubishi, Nissan and Subaru to promote it.

== TEPCO to cancel nuclear promotion abroad ==
Early June 2012 TEPCO announced that it would cancel all export of nuclear expertise abroad, because it needed to focus on the stabilisation of the damaged reactors in Fukushima. All participation in a program to supply and run two nuclear reactors at a plant in Vietnam would be cancelled. This project undertaken by International Nuclear Energy Development, a public company set up in 2010 by heavy machinery producers and power companies, including TEPCO, aims to promote Japanese nuclear expertise and exports. According to Naomi Hirose, director of TEPCO, "Our atomic power engineers still need to do a lot more to stabilise and decommission the reactors" at the crippled Fukushima Daiichi plant, and: "It is impossible" to abandon the domestic task and promote exports.

== See also ==
- Denko-chan (でんこちゃん), a discontinued mascot character designed by manga artist Shungicu Uchida
- Masataka Shimizu, TEPCO president during the March 11th 2011 disaster
- CHAdeMO, electric vehicle standard
- Nuclear power in Japan
- International Nuclear Energy Development of Japan Co., Ltd (JINED)
- Innovation Network Corporation of Japan (INCJ)
- Radiation effects from Fukushima Daiichi nuclear disaster
- Subaru R1e
- Masao Yoshida (nuclear engineer)
- Shunichi Yamashita, physician in radiation sickness field
- Murder of Yasuko Watanabe (familiarly known as "TEPCO OL murder case" in Japan)
- Fukushima 50, name for workers remaining on site of the Fukushima Daiichi nuclear disaster
