= Arimine Dam =

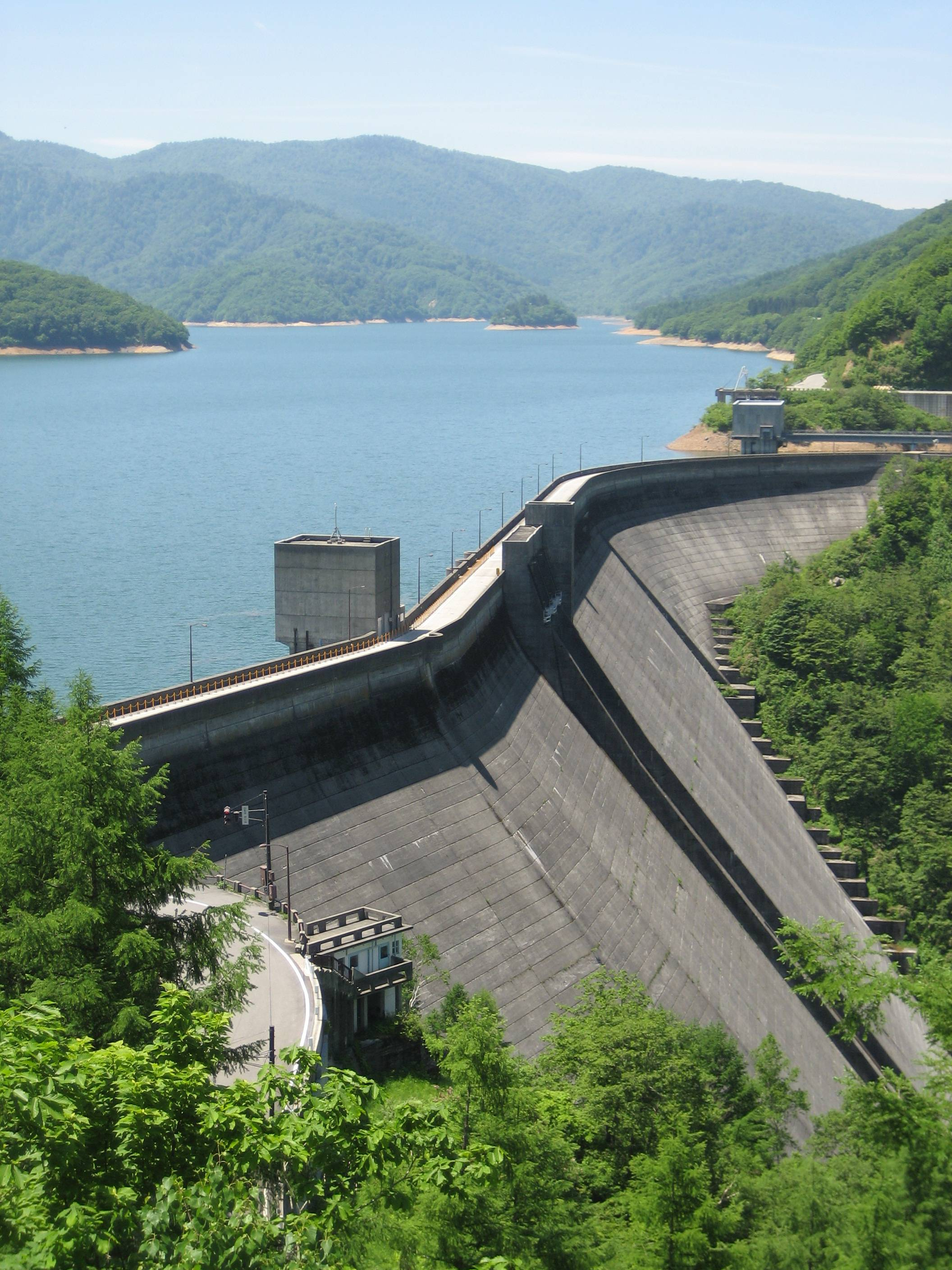
- Interactive map of Arimine Dam
- Location: Toyama, Toyama, Arimine
- Coordinates: 36°29′22″N 137°26′55″E
- Construction began: 1956
- Opening date: 1959

Dam and spillways
- Height: 140 m (460 ft)
- Length: 500 m (1,600 ft)

Reservoir
- Total capacity: 222×10^{6} m^{3} (7.8×10^{9} cu ft)

Power Station
- Installed capacity: Wadagawa I (和田川第一発電所): 27,000 kW Wadagawa II (和田川第二発電所): 122,000 kW; Arimine I (有峰第一発電所): 265,000 kW; Arimine II (有峰第二発電所): 120,000 kW; Arimine Dam (有峰ダム発電所): 170 kW Total: 534,170 kW

The Arimine Dam (有峰ダム, Arimine Damu) is located in Toyama, Toyama Prefecture, Japan built upon the Wada River. The two bends in the middle of the dam is the most defining feature. The Arimine Lake is an artificial lake that was created by construction of the dam.

== History ==
The tributaries of the Jōganji River were found to be very attractive for hydroelectric power in the early 20th century due to their high flow and mountainous geography. This caught the attention of the electric utility of the time, the Etchu Electric Power Company, and for the purpose of electricity built a dam on the Wada River. At around the same time the Toyama Prefecture was considering a dam for purposes of flood control and irrigation. Construction of a prefecture managed dam began before World War II but the start of the war halted construction. Later, the Hokuriku Electric Power Company inherited the unfinished dam due to restructuring of the power companies. The plans changed to make the primary purpose of the dam electricity production and was finished in the 50s. It now contributes to electric power as well as irrigation and flood control.

== See also ==
- List of dams and reservoirs in Japan
