= Vietnamese people in Russia =

Total population
- 80,000 (2023)

Regions with significant populations
- Moscow, Vladivostok, Saint Petersburg, and other large cities

Languages
- Vietnamese, Russian

Religion
- Predominantly Vietnamese folk religion, Mahayana Buddhism, minority others

Related ethnic groups
- Vietnamese people

Vietnamese people in Russia form the 72nd-largest ethnic minority community in Russia according to the 2002 census. With a population of 80,000 according to the Vietnamese embassy in Moscow as of 2023, they are one of the smaller groups of overseas Vietnamese.

== History ==
In 1926, Vietnamese students were sent to study in the Soviet Union under an initiative of Hồ Chí Minh. A number of them served the Soviet Army during World War II. Ho Chi Minh himself studied in Moscow in the 1920s, along with other senior members of the Communist Party of Vietnam. They were followed by an estimated total of 50,000 Vietnamese who studied in the Soviet Union during the Cold War. Academic exchange between the two countries continued even after the dissolution of the Soviet Union.

== Demographics ==
As of 2006, roughly 4,000 Vietnamese students were studying in Russian universities; the Russian government provides scholarships to 160 of them. Notable Vietnamese students who have studied in Russia since the dissolution of the Soviet Union include Quynh Nguyen, a pianist from Hanoi who received a scholarship to Moscow's Gnessin State Musical College.

== See also ==
- Russia–Vietnam relations
- Japanese people in Russia
- Vietnamese diaspora
- Immigration to Russia
- Koryo-saram
- Sakhalin Koreans
