= JINED =

Japanese power company consortium

Coordinates: 35.671975°N 139.757702°E

International Nuclear Energy Development of Japan Co., Ltd (JINED) 国際原子力開発株式会社
- Type: Private
- Industry: Nuclear technology
- Founded: October 22, 2010
- Headquarters: 17th Floor, NBF Hibiya Bldg. 1-7, Uchisaiwai-cho 1-chome, Chiyoda-ku, Tokyo, Japan
- Key people: Ichiro Takekuro, CEO
- Products: Nuclear reactors
- Services: Construction of nuclear power plants and Nuclear research projects
- Website: www.jined.co.jp

The International Nuclear Energy Development of Japan Co., Ltd (JINED) (国際原子力開発株式会社, Kokusai Genshiryoku Kaihatsu Kabushikigaisha), headquartered in Tokyo, is a consortium of thirteen Japanese companies, with the prime purpose of "proposal and research activities for nuclear power plant project orders in emerging countries".

The thirteen-member consortium was established on 22 October 2010, and its members consist of nine Japanese power companies (Tokyo Electric Power Company, Kansai, Chubu, Hokkaido, Tohoku, Hokuriku, Chugoku, Shikoku, and Kyushu), and three Japanese nuclear power-related manufacturers (Toshiba, Hitachi, and Mitsubishi Heavy Industries). The thirteenth member is a joint venture between the government of Japan and industry, Innovation Network of Japan (INCJ).

== History ==
On July 6, 2010, a consortium of six Japanese companies (three power utility companies and three nuclear power plant manufacturers) consisting of The Tokyo Electric Power Co., Inc., Chubu Electric Power Co., Inc., Kansai Electric Power Co., Inc., Toshiba Corporation, Hitachi, and Mitsubishi Heavy Industries, established a new office in Tokyo, to set the stage for the foundation of a new company, with the primary objective "to engage in proposal activities for the construction of nuclear power plants and nuclear research projects in the emerging countries".

The consortium was increased to thirteen Japanese companies and on October 22, 2010, the consortium joined hands to establish International Nuclear Energy Development of Japan Co., Ltd. (JINED), with an equity capital of two hundred million yen, including one hundred million yen of capital reserve.

The 13-member consortium consists of nine Japanese power companies - The Tokyo Electric Power Co., Inc., Chubu Electric Power Co., Inc., The Kansai Electric Power Co., Inc., Hokuriku Electric Power Company, Hokkaido Electric Power Co., Inc., Tohoku Electric Power Co., Inc., The Chugoku Electric Power Co., Inc., Shikoku Electric Power Co., Inc., Kyushu Electric Power Co., Inc., three Japanese nuclear power-related manufactures - Toshiba Corporation, Hitachi, Ltd., and Mitsubishi Heavy Industries, Ltd., and the thirteenth member - a joint venture between government of Japan and its industries, Innovation Network Corporation of Japan (INCJ).

Under legislative and financing support from the Japanese Government, JINED in collaboration with Ministry of Economy, Trade and Industry of Japan (METI) will be engaged in activities leading to the creation of proposals to support nuclear power plant projects in the emerging countries. It won the Ninh Thuận 2 Nuclear Power Plant project order in Ninh Thuan province, Vietnam. However, plans for it were cancelled in 2016.

== Shareholdings ==
- The Tokyo Electric Power Co., Inc. (20%)
- The Kansai Electric Power Co., Inc. (15%)
- Chubu Electric Power Co., Inc. (10%)
- Hokkaido Electric Power Co., Inc. (5%)
- Tohoku Electric Power Co., Inc. (5%)
- Hokuriku Electric Power Company (5%)
- The Chugoku Electric Power Co., Inc. (5%)
- Shikoku Electric Power Co., Inc. (5%)
- Kyushu Electric Power Co., Inc. (5%)
- Toshiba Corporation (5%)
- Hitachi, Ltd. (5%)
- Mitsubishi Heavy Industries, Ltd. (5%)
- Innovation Network Corporation of Japan (10%)

== Organisation and leadership ==
JINED is headquartered in Tokyo and its board has eight directors (one full-time and seven part-time), three auditors, and nine employees.

The CEO is Ichiro Takekuro, who also holds the post of Fellow of Tokyo Electric Power Co., Inc.
