= Ninh Thuận 1 Nuclear Power Plant =

Planned power plant in Vietnam

- Country: Vietnam
- Location: Phước Dinh Commune, Khánh Hòa province
- Coordinates: 11°24′48″N 108°58′29″E
- Status: Proposed
- Construction began: 2027 or 2028 (planned)
- Owner: Vietnam Electricity
- Operator: EVNNPB

Nuclear power station
- Reactor type: VVER-1200
- Reactor supplier: Atomstroyexport

Power generation
- Units planned: 2 x 1,200 MWe
- Nameplate capacity: 2,400 MW

The Ninh Thuận 1 Nuclear Power Plant is a planned nuclear power plant at Phước Dinh Commune, Khánh Hòa province, Vietnam. Plans for it were cancelled in 2016. It will consisted of two 1,200 MWe VVER pressurised water reactors. The plant was to be built by Atomstroyexport, a subsidiary of Rosatom, and to be owned and operated by state-owned electricity company Vietnam Electricity. Fuel will be supplied and used fuel will be reprocessed by Rosatom. The feasibility study was to be carried out by E4 Group.

The plant would have been built based on a nuclear power development plan, approved by the Vietnamese government in 2007. In 2009, Vietnam's National Assembly approved a resolution on investment policy for the project. On 31 October 2010, Vietnamese government and Rosatom signed a construction agreement.

Works to prepare the construction site started in December 2011. Construction was to start by 2014 and the first unit to be commissioned by 2020. However, in 2014, the Prime Minister Nguyễn Tấn Dũng announced that the construction would be postponed until 2020 to ensure the highest degree of safety. The construction was supposedly financed by the US$8 billion loan from Russia. In 2024, the National Assembly of Vietnam approved the resumption of the nuclear power program in Ninh Thuận, largely as continuation of the frozen project.

In early 2026, Vietnam and Russia formally inked agreement for two VVER-1200 reactors for Ninh Thuận 1, with Leningrad NPP 2 to become the reference project.

== See also ==
- List of nuclear reactors - Vietnam
- Ninh Thuận 2 Nuclear Power Plant
- Nuclear energy in Vietnam
- Nuclear energy policy by country - Vietnam
