= Tōkai Nuclear Power Plant =

Defunct nuclear power plant in Tokai, Ibaraki Prefecture, Japan (1966-2011)

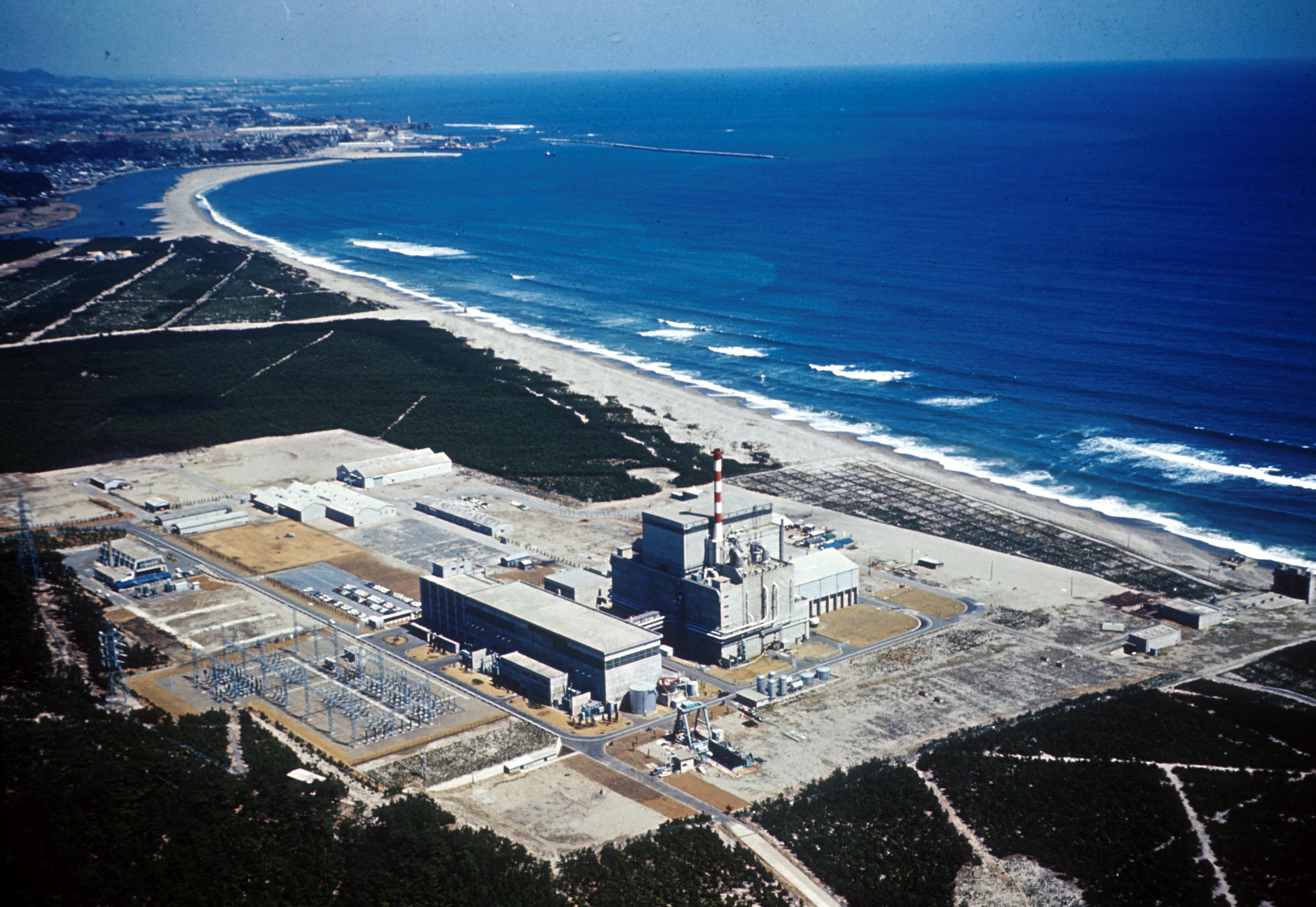
- Tōkai Nuclear Power Plant (circa 1960s)
- Country: Japan
- Coordinates: 36°27′59″N 140°36′24″E
- Status: Out of service for 15 years, 7 months
- Construction began: March 1, 1961
- Commission date: July 25, 1966
- Operator: Japan Atomic Power Company

Nuclear power station
- Reactor type: GCR Magnox, BWR
- Reactor supplier: GE Hitachi Shimizu, Fuji Electric GEC

Power generation
- Units operational: 1 × 1100 MW
- Units decommissioned: 1 × 166 MW
- Nameplate capacity: 1100 MW
- Capacity factor: 0%
- Annual net output: 0 GW·h

External links
- Website: www.japc.co.jp/tokai/english/plant_guide/tokai02.html
- Commons: Related media on Commons

The Tōkai Nuclear Power Plant (東海発電所, Tōkai hatsuden-sho; Tōkai NPP) was Japan's first commercial nuclear power plant. The first unit was built in the early 1960s to the British Magnox design, and generated power from 1966 until it was decommissioned in 1998.

A second unit, nominally a separate power station called Tōkai No.2 Power Station (東海第二発電所, Tōkai daini hatsuden-sho), was built at the site in the 1970s, the first in Japan to produce over 1060 to 1100 MW of electricity. The site is located in Tokai in the Naka District in Ibaraki Prefecture, Japan and is operated by the Japan Atomic Power Company. The total site area amounts to 0.76 km^{2} (188 acres) with 0.33 km^{2}, or 43% of it, being green area that the company is working to preserve.

The plant has been not operational since the reactor shut down automatically due to the 2011 Tōhoku earthquake and tsunami.

== Reactors on site ==
Unit	Type	Average electric power	Capacity	Construction started	First criticality	Commercial operation	Closure
Tōkai I	Magnox (GCR) Fuji Electric, Hitachi, GEC (UK), Shimizu	159 MW	166 MW	1 March 1961	10 November 1965	25 July 1966	31 March 1998
Tōkai II	BWR/5 GE, GEC, Hitachi, Shimizu	1060 MW	1100 MW	3 October 1973	13 March 1978	28 November 1978	Safety upgrade since March 2011

=== Unit 1 ===
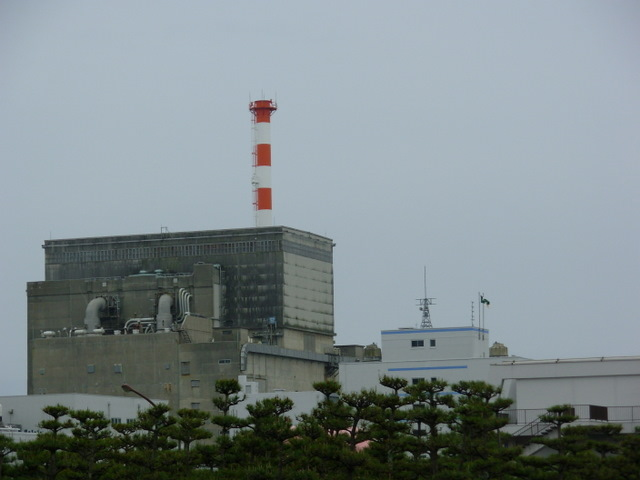
Tōkai I

This reactor was built based on the British-developed Magnox technology for dual-use. Unit 1 is the first full-size nuclear reactor to be decommissioned in Japan. The experience in decommissioning this plant is expected to be of use in the future when more Japanese plants are decommissioned. Below is a brief time-line of the process:

- 31 March 1998: Operations cease
- March 2001: Last of the nuclear fuel moved off-site
- 4 October 2001: Decommissioning plan announced
- December 2001: Decommissioning begins, spent fuel pool is cleaned
- 2003: Turbine room and electric generator taken down
- Late 2004: Fuel moving crane dismantled
- 2011: Reactor itself is dismantled

=== Unit 2 ===
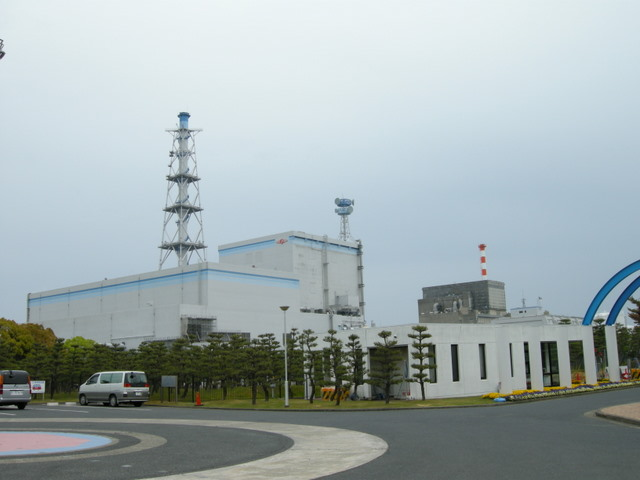
Tōkai II

Unit 2 is a Boiling Water Reactor and was the first nuclear reactor built in Japan to produce over 1,100 MW of electricity. By some formalities in the paperwork, the unit is technically separate from the rest of the nuclear facilities in Tokai, but it is managed with the rest of them and even shares the same front gate.

Despite being shut down since March 2011, Unit 2 received approval for resuming its operations on 26 September 2018 from the Japanese Nuclear Regulatory Authority. However, the project has faced delays since then and still remains nonoperational.

== History ==
=== Tokaimura accidents ===
Two separate nuclear accidents occurred in the 90s at the Tokai plant and nearby reprocessing facility, both in Tokai village (Tokaimura). In March 1997 a fire broke out in the bituminisation facility where spent fuel is encased in molten asphalt (bitumen) for storage. The event exposed more than 20 people to radiation but there were no direct fatalities.

The second more serious accident occurred on 30 September 1999 when workers, who were not properly trained, brought too much highly enriched uranium together causing a criticality accident. A total of 119 people were exposed to radiation of which 2 were fatal cases.

In 2002, an evaluation technology adopted by the Japan Society of Civil Engineers had determined that the site of the plant could experience tsunami waves as high as 4.86 metres. The government of Ibaraki prefecture published their own calculations in October 2007, where they estimated that such waves could be as high as 6 to 7 metres. Japan Atomic Power changed its wave level assumption to 5.7 meters. Reconstruction works to raise the height of the 4.9-metre protection around the plant to 6.1 meters were started in July 2009, in order to protect the seawater pumps intended to cool an emergency diesel generator. Although most of the work was completed by September 2010, cable holes in the levee were still not fully covered. This work was scheduled to be completed around May 2011. Additions to the seawall that raised it to a height of 6.1 meters were completed on 9 March, just two days before the 2011 Tōhoku earthquake and tsunami.

In November 2018, the NRA approved a 20-year extension. Following that, the operator will need the consent of the Ibaraki prefectural government, as well as six local municipalities, including the village of Tokai.

=== 2011 earthquake and tsunami ===
When the tsunami did hit the Tokai plant in March 2011, the waves were 5.3 to 5.4 metres in height, higher than earlier estimations but still 30 to 40 centimetres lower than the most recent estimation. The Tokai plant suffered a loss of external power-supply. The levee was overrun, but only one of three seawater pumps failed, and the reactors could be kept stable and safe in cold shutdown with the emergency diesel generator cooled by the two remaining seawater pumps.

Following the 2011 Tōhoku earthquake and tsunami, the Number 2 reactor was one of eleven nuclear reactors nationwide to be shut down automatically. It was reported on 14 March that a cooling system pump for the Number 2 reactor had stopped working. Japan Atomic Power Company stated that there was a second operational pump and that cooling was working, but that two of three diesel generators used to power the cooling system were out of order.

Construction work on additional safety measures, including a 1.7 km sea wall to protect from possible tsunamis, was originally scheduled to be completed in March 2021. In 2020 it was announced this was delayed until December 2022.

=== Stress tests ===
After the disaster in Fukushima, a stress-test was ordered by the Japanese government, since an investigation of the electrical installations of the Tokai 2 reactor revealed that they did not meet the earthquake-resistance standards set by the government.

Seismic research in 2011 showed that the 11 March quake was caused by the simultaneous movement by multiple active faults off the coast of northern Japan in the Pacific Ocean, and in this way a much bigger earthquakes could be triggered, than the plants were designed to withstand at the time they were built. In March 2012, the Tokai 2 Plant in Ibaraki Prefecture and the Tomari power facility in Hokkaido, said that they could not rule out the possibility that the plants were vulnerable. Other nuclear power stations declared that the active faults near their nuclear plants would not move at the same time, and even when this would happen, the impact would be limited. NISA would look into the evaluation of active faults done by the plants.

In 2017 the Nuclear Regulation Authority discovered that the wrong fuel rod position data had been used in safety evaluations since the plant had been built, consequent to a change to fuel rod specifications during the design and construction process.

=== Mito District Court injunction ===
In March 2021, the Mito District Court ordered the Tokai 2 reactor suspend operations, following the request of 224 plaintiffs. The plaintiffs, residents of Ibaraki Prefecture and the Tokyo metropolitan area, filed a lawsuit in 2012 against the operator. One of the key contentions was the appropriateness of the Japan Atomic Power's seismic ground motion figure. The operator defended its basis seismic ground motion figure as 50 percent higher than the average. The plaintiffs contended that the figure should be four times as high as the current figure.

=== Restart ===
As of August 2025, approvals are underway for restarting the reactor.

== Public opinion ==
On 11 October 2011 Tatsuya Murakami, the mayor of the village Tokai, said in a meeting with minister Goshi Hosono, that the Tokai 2 reactor situated 110 kilometers from Tokyo should be decommissioned, because the reactor was more than 30 years old, and the people had lost confidence in the nuclear safety commission of the government.

In 2011 and 2012, about 100,000 signatures against the resumption of the plant's operation which shutdown due to the 2011 earthquake, were submitted to Ibaraki Governor Masaru Hashimoto. The petition urged the prefectural government not to allow the Tokai power station to resume operation, saying, "We should not allow a recurrence of the irretrievable sacrifice and loss as experienced in the Fukushima Daiichi nuclear power plant accident".

== Reprocessing plant ==
The Tokai nuclear complex also contained a reprocessing plant built in 1971 that operated from 1981 until 2006. In 2014 it was decided to permanently cease operations because upgrades to match the post-Fukushima safety requirements were uneconomical.

== See also ==
- Fukushima Daiichi nuclear disaster
- List of boiling water reactors
- Lists of nuclear disasters and radioactive incidents
- List of nuclear power plants in Japan
- Tokaimura nuclear accident
- 5 yen coin § Use in nuclear accident investigation
- Rokkasho Reprocessing Plant, meant to be the successor of the Tokai reprocessing Plant
