= Suruga-Tokuyama Station =

Railway station in Kawanehon, Shizuoka Prefecture, Japan

Suruga-Tokuyama Station 駿河徳山駅
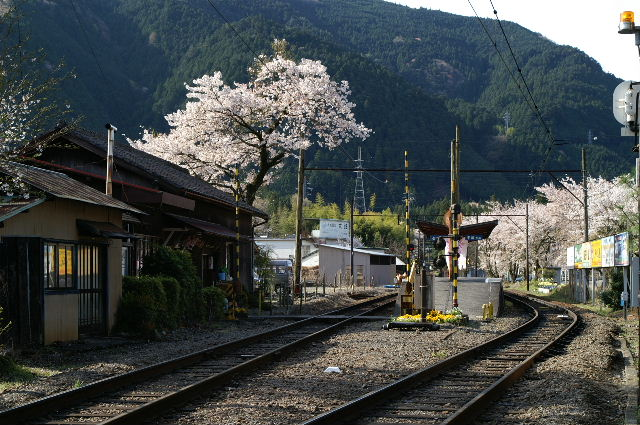
- Suruga-Tokuyama Station in April 2008

General information
- Location: Tokuyama, Kawanehon-cho, Haibara-gun, Shizuoka-ken; Japan
- Coordinates: 35°04′29″N 138°06′38″E
- Operator: Ōigawa Railway
- Line: ■Ōigawa Main Line
- Distance: 24.1 kilometers from Kanaya
- Platforms: 1 island platform

Other information
- Status: Staffed

History
- Opened: April 12, 1931

Passengers
- FY2017: 37 daily
Location
- Location within Shizuoka Prefecture Location within Japan

Suruga-Tokuyama Station (駿河徳山駅, Suruga-Tokuyama-eki) is a railway station in the town of Kawanehon, Haibara District, Shizuoka Prefecture, Japan, operated by the Ōigawa Railway.

== Lines ==
Suruga-Tokuyama Station is served by the Ōigawa Main Line, and is located 34.1 kilometers from the official starting point of the line at Kanaya.

== Station layout ==
The station has a single island platform connected to a small wooden station building by a level crossing. The station is staffed.

== Adjacent stations ==
«	Service	»
Ōigawa Railway
Ōigawa Main Line
Shimoizumi	SL Express	Senzu
Tanokuchi	Local	Aobe

== Station history ==
Suruga-Tokuyama Station was one of the original stations of the Ōigawa Main Line, and was opened on April 12, 1931.

== Passenger statistics ==
In fiscal 2017, the station was used by an average of 37 passengers daily (boarding passengers only).

== Surrounding area ==
- Japan National Route 362*Kawanehon High School

== See also ==
- List of railway stations in Japan
