= Gōkaku Station =

Railway station in Shimada, Shizuoka Prefecture, Japan

Gōkaku Station 合格駅
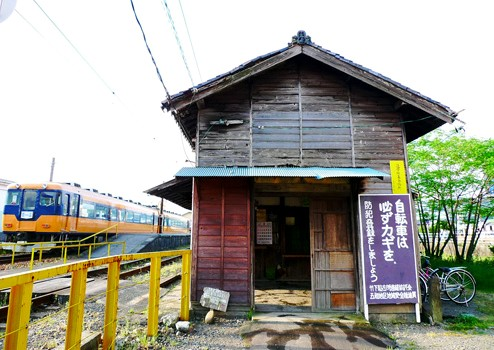
- Gōkaku Station in July 2008

General information
- Location: Shima Takeshita-aze, Shimada-shi, Shizuoka-ken; Japan
- Coordinates: 34°50′43.66″N 138°7′14.02″E
- Operator: Ōigawa Railway
- Line: ■Ōigawa Main Line
- Distance: 5.0 kilometers from Kanaya
- Platforms: 1 island platform

Other information
- Status: Unstaffed

History
- Opened: June 10, 1927
- Former names: Goka (五和, - 11 Nov., 2020)

Passengers
- FY2017: 26 daily
Location
- Location within Shizuoka Prefecture Location within Japan

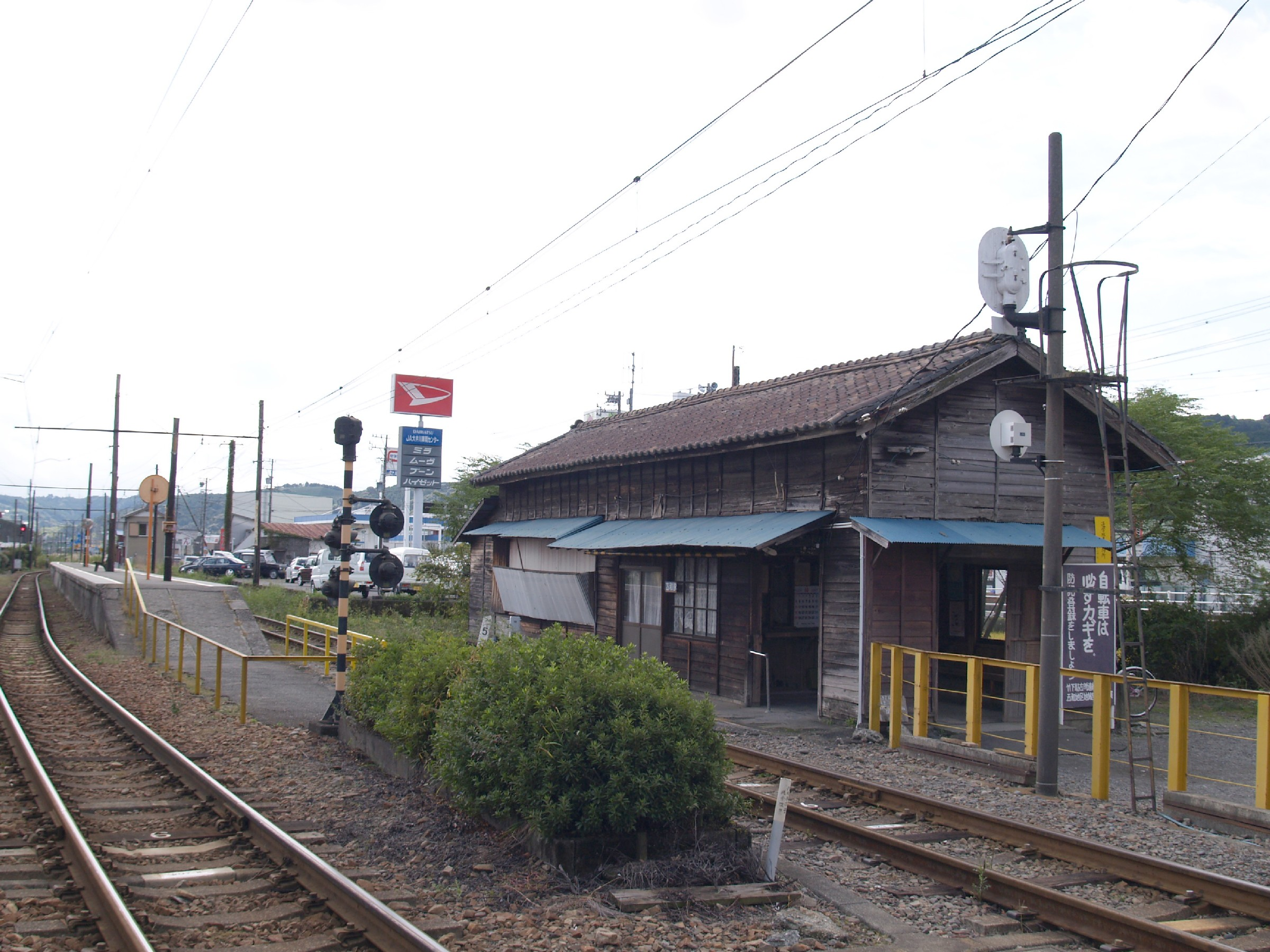
Gōkaku Station

Gōkaku Station (合格駅, Gōkaku-eki), formerly known as Goka Station (五和駅, Goka-eki), is a railway station in the city of Shimada, Shizuoka Prefecture, Japan, operated by the Ōigawa Railway. Its location was formerly the town of Kanaya, which was merged into Shimada in 2005.

== Lines ==
Gōkaku Station is on the Ōigawa Main Line and is 5.0 from the terminus of the line at Kanaya Station.

== Station layout ==
The station has a single island platform connected to a rustic wooden station building by a level crossing. The station is unattended.

== Adjacent stations ==
«	Service	»
Ōigawa Railway
Ōigawa Main Line
SL Express: Does not stop at this station
Higiri	Local	Kadode

== Station history ==
Gokaku Station was one of the original stations of the Ōigawa Main Line and was opened on June 10, 1927, as Goka Station. Goka Station was in Goka Village (五和村, Goka-mura).

On 12 November 2020, the station renamed to Gōkaku Station (合格駅, Gōkaku-eki; lit. Passing (an exam) Station) along with opening of Kadode Station (門出駅, Kadode-eki), which is next to the station and means Starting-New-Life Station in Japanese.

== Passenger statistics ==
In fiscal 2017, the station was used by an average of 26 passengers daily (boarding passengers only).

== Surrounding area ==
- Japan National Route 473
- Goka Elementary School

== See also ==
- List of railway stations in Japan
