= Kawaneonsen-Sasamado Station =

Railway station in Shimada, Shizuoka Prefecture, Japan

Kawaneonsen-Sasamado Station 川根温泉笹間渡駅
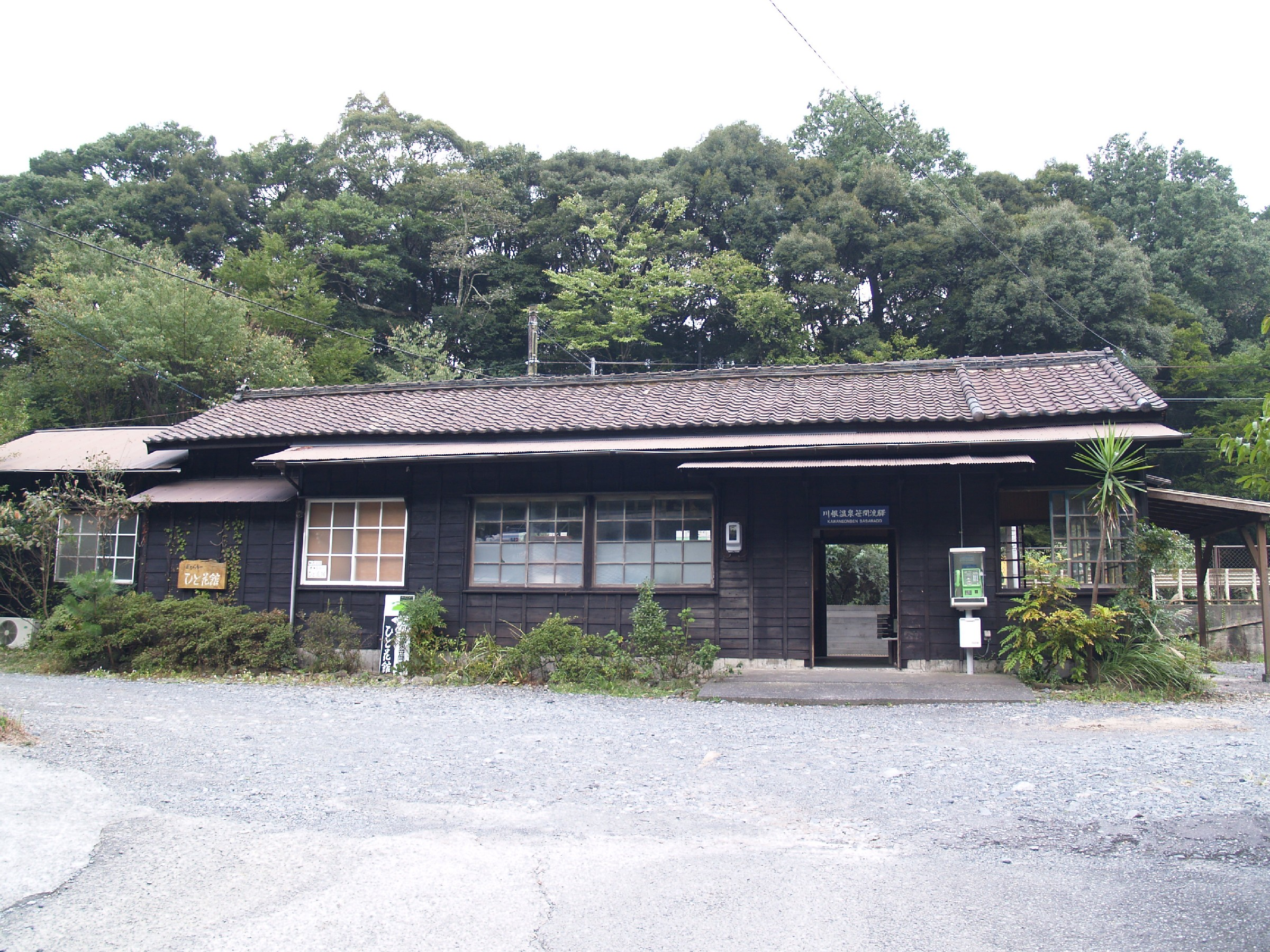
- Kawaneonsen-Sasamado in October 2009

General information
- Location: Kawane-Sasamado Tamabuchi, Shimada-shi, Shizuoka-ken; Japan
- Coordinates: 34°57′44″N 138°05′10″E
- Operator: Ōigawa Railway
- Line: ■Ōigawa Main Line
- Distance: 20.0 kilometers from Kanaya
- Platforms: 1 side platform

Other information
- Status: Staffed

History
- Opened: July 16, 1930
- Former names: Sasamado (until 2003)

Passengers
- FY2017: 20 daily
Location
- Location within Shizuoka Prefecture Location within Japan

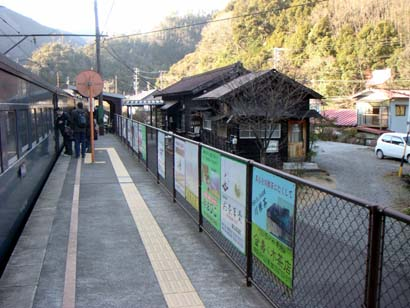
Platform

Kawaneonsen-Sasamado Station (川根温泉笹間渡駅, Kawaneonsen-Sasamado-eki) is a railway station in the city of Shimada, Shizuoka Prefecture, Japan, operated by the Ōigawa Railway. Its location was formerly the town of Kawane, which was merged into Shimada in 2008.

== Lines ==
Kawaneonsen-Sasamado Station is on the Ōigawa Main Line and is 20.0 from the terminus of the line at Kanaya Station.

== Station layout ==
The station has a single side platform and a small wooden station building. The station is unattended.

== Adjacent stations ==
«	Service	»
Ōigawa Railway
Ōigawa Main Line
Ieyama	SL Express	Shimoizumi
Nukuri	Local	Jina

== Station history ==
Kawaneonsen-Sasamado Station was one of the original stations of the Ōigawa Main Line, and was opened on July 16, 1930 as Sasamado Station (笹間渡駅, Sasamado-eki), its name was changed in 2003 to emphasize its proximity to the Kawane hot spring resort.

== Passenger statistics ==
In fiscal 2017, the station was used by an average of 30 passengers daily (boarding passengers only).

== Surrounding area ==
- Kawane onsen

== See also ==
- List of railway stations in Japan
