= Jina Station =

Railway station in Kawanehon, Shizuoka Prefecture, Japan

Jina Station 地名駅
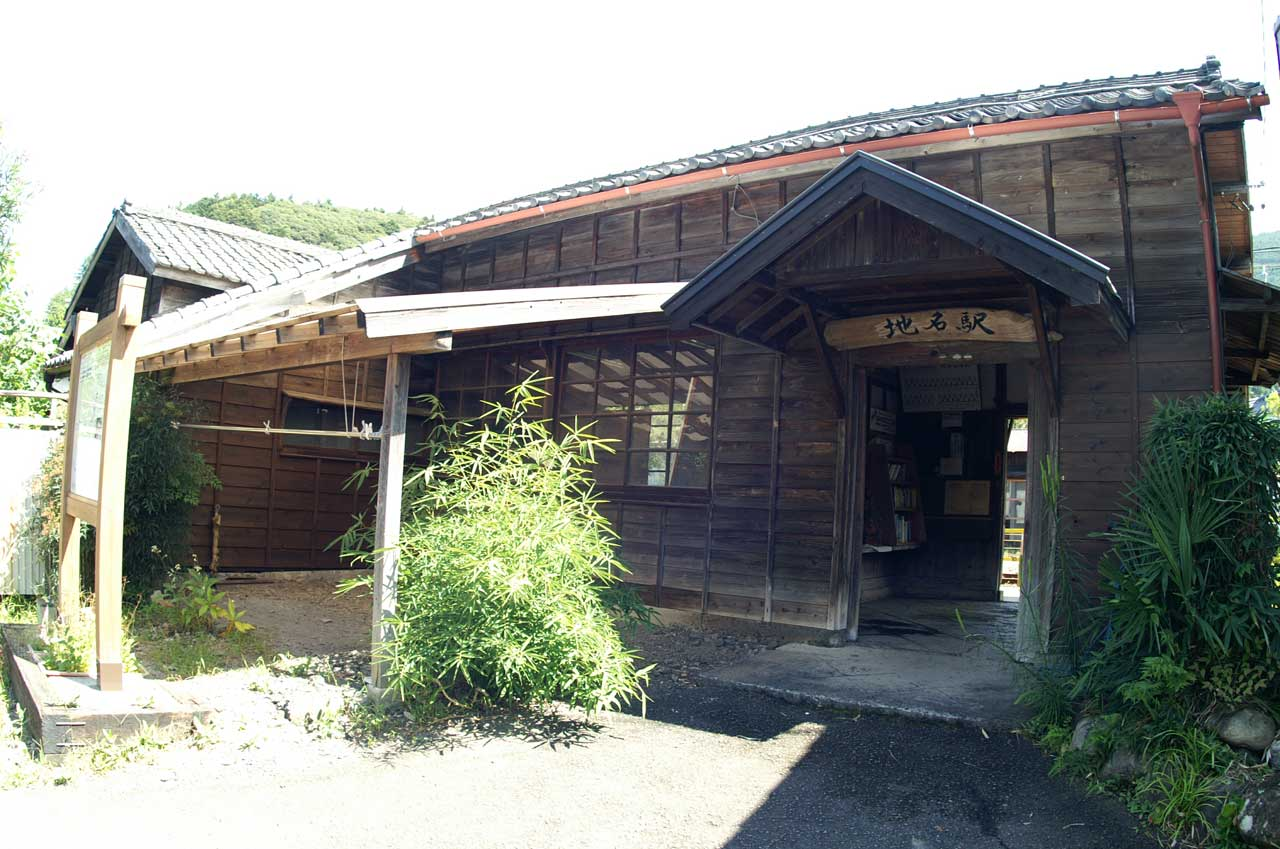
- Jina Station in March 2008

General information
- Location: Jina, Kawanehon-cho, Haibara-gun, Shizuoka ken Japan
- Coordinates: 34°59′9.79″N 138°5′14.15″E
- Operator: Ōigawa Railway
- Line: ■Ōigawa Main Line
- Distance: 22.9 kilometers from Kanaya
- Platforms: 1 island platforms

Other information
- Status: Staffed

History
- Opened: July 16, 1930

Passengers
- FY2017: 8 daily
Location
- Location within Shizuoka Prefecture Location within Japan

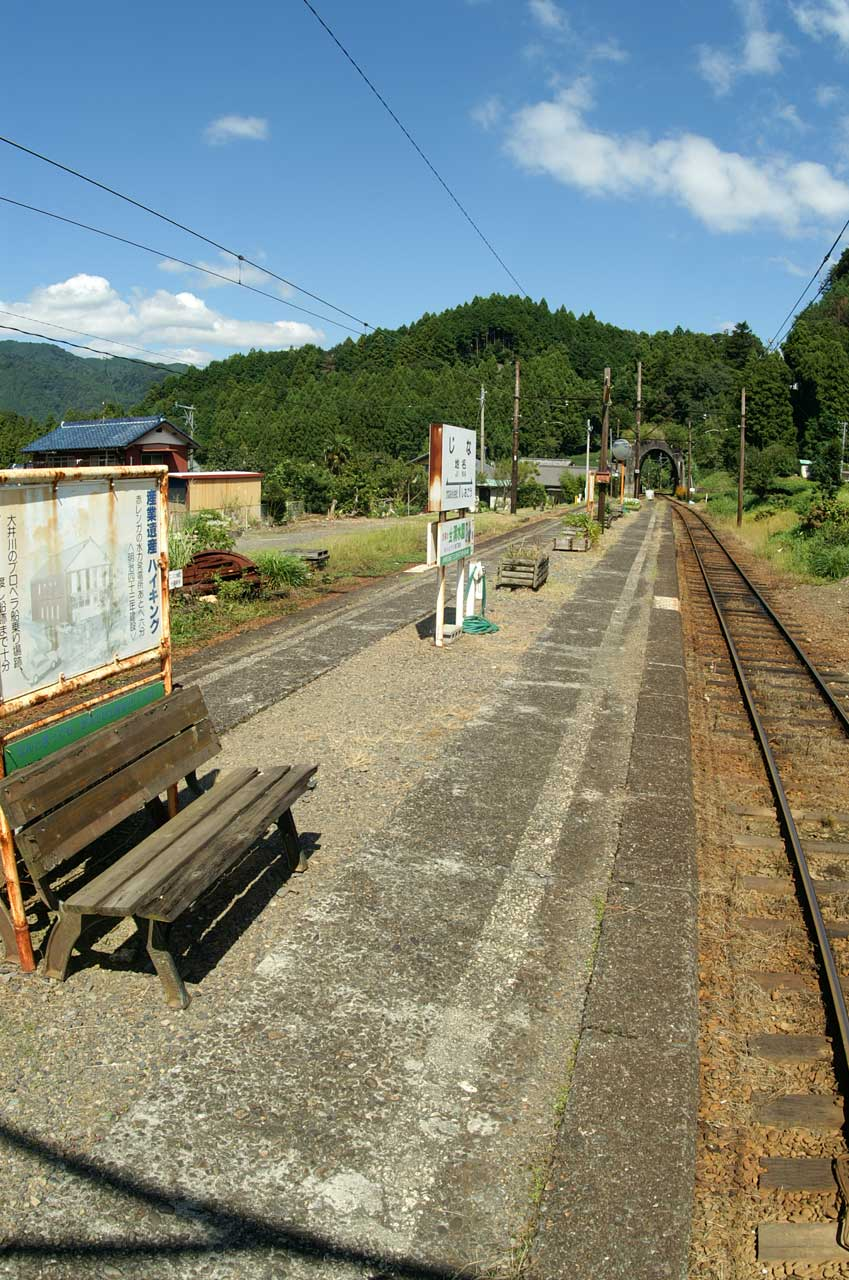
Platform

Jina Station (地名駅, Jina-eki) is a railway station in the town of Kawanehon, Haibara District, Shizuoka Prefecture, Japan operated by the Ōigawa Railway.

== Lines ==
Jina Station is served by the Ōigawa Main Line, and is located 22.9 kilometers from the official starting point of the line at Kanaya.

== Station layout ==
The station has a single island platform connected to a small wooden station building by a level crossing. The station is staffed.

== Adjacent stations ==
«	Service	»
Ōigawa Railway
Ōigawa Main Line
SL Express: Does not stop at this station
Kawaneonsen-Sasamado	Local	Shiogō

== Station history ==
Jina Station was one of the original stations of the Ōigawa Main Line, and was opened on July 16, 1930.

== Passenger statistics ==
In fiscal 2017, the station was used by an average of 8 passengers daily (boarding passengers only).

== Surrounding area ==
- Japan National Route 473

== See also ==
- List of railway stations in Japan
