= Owada Station =

Railway station in Shimada, Shizuoka Prefecture, Japan

Owada Station 大和田駅
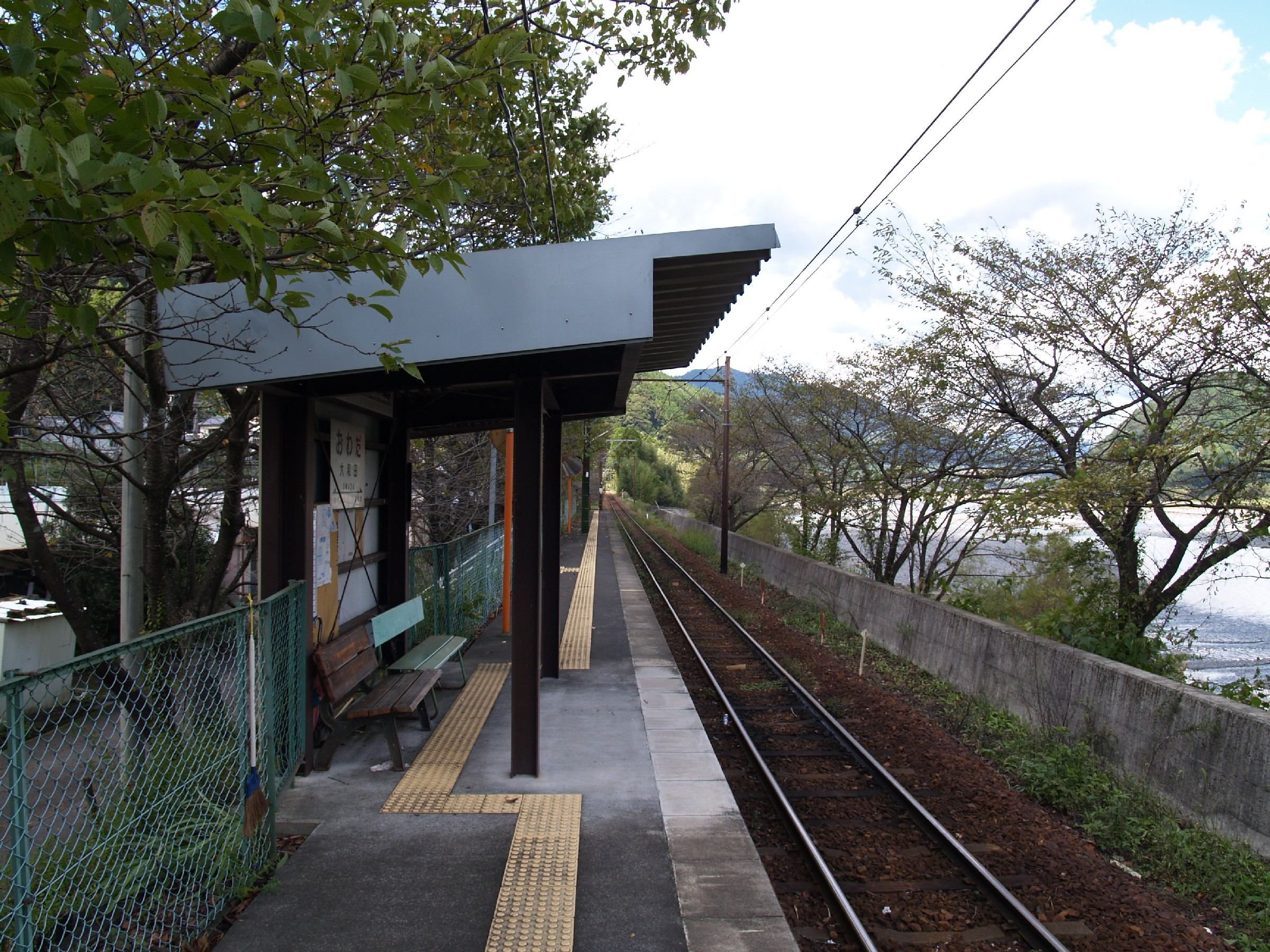
- Owada Station in October 2009

General information
- Location: Kawane-cho, Shimada-shi, Shizuoka-ken; Japan
- Coordinates: 34°55′16.15″N 138°4′55.61″E
- Operator: Ōigawa Railway
- Line: ■Ōigawa Main Line
- Distance: 14.8 kilometers from Kanaya
- Platforms: 1 side platform

Other information
- Status: Unstaffed

History
- Opened: July 1, 1969

Passengers
- FY2017: 9 daily
Location
- Location within Shizuoka Prefecture Location within Japan

Owada Station (大和田駅, Owada-eki) is a railway station in the city of Shimada, Shizuoka Prefecture, Japan, operated by the Ōigawa Railway. Its location was formerly the town of Kawane, which was merged into Shimada in 2008.

== Lines ==
Owada Station is on the Ōigawa Main Line and is 14.8 from the terminus of the line at Kanaya Station.

== Station layout ==
The station has a single side platform. There is no station building. The station is unattended.

== Adjacent stations ==
«	Service	»
Ōigawa Railway
Ōigawa Main Line
SL Express: Does not stop at this station
Fukuyō	Local	Ieyama

== Station history ==
Owada Station was opened on July 1, 1969.

== Passenger statistics ==
In fiscal 2017, the station was used by an average of 9 passengers daily (boarding passengers only).

== Surrounding area ==
- Oi River
- Japan National Route 473

== See also ==
- List of railway stations in Japan
