= Higiri Station =

Railway station in Shimada, Shizuoka Prefecture, Japan

Higiri Station 日切駅
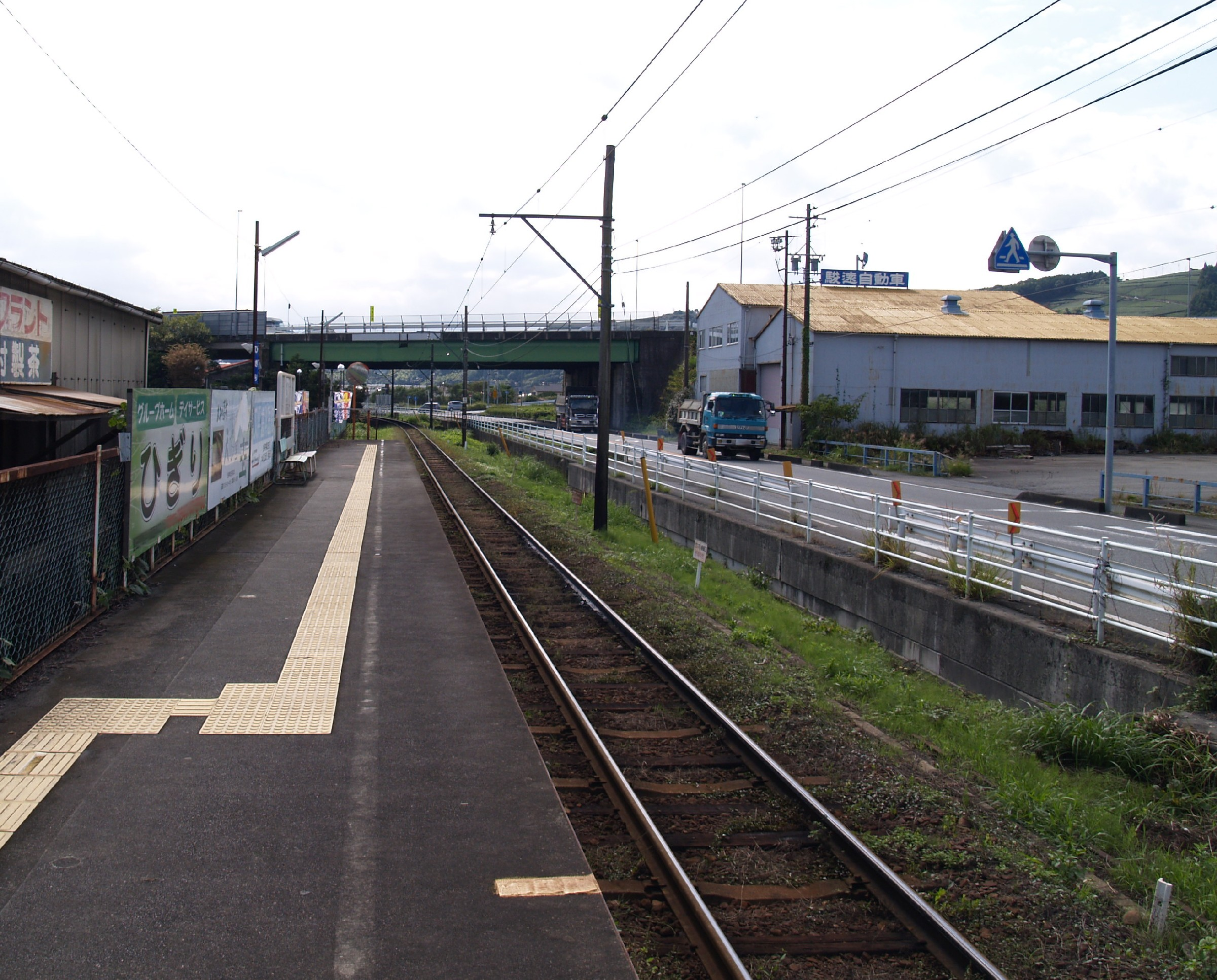
- Higiri Station

General information
- Location: Shima-aze, Onishishita, Shimada-shi, Shizuoka-ken; Japan
- Coordinates: 34°50′20.55″N 138°7′20.51″E
- Operator: Ōigawa Railway
- Line: ■Ōigawa Main Line
- Distance: 4.3 kilometers from Kanaya
- Platforms: 1 side platform

Other information
- Status: Unstaffed

History
- Opened: July 23, 1985

Passengers
- FY2017: 8 daily
Location
- Location within Shizuoka Prefecture Location within Japan

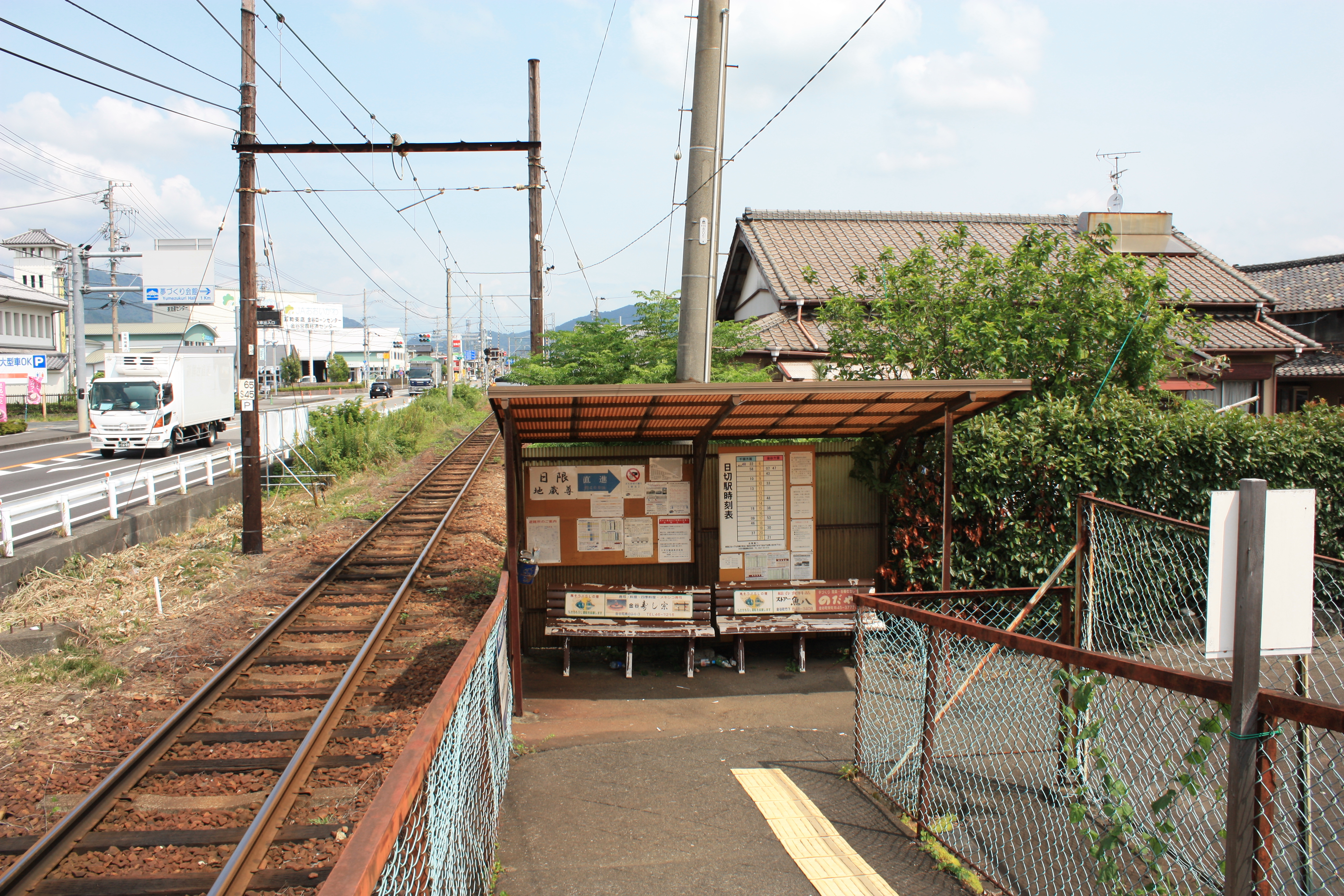
Station exit

Higiri Station (日切駅, Higiri-eki) is a railway station in the city of Shimada, Shizuoka Prefecture, Japan, operated by the Ōigawa Railway.

== Lines ==
Higiri Station is on the Ōigawa Main Line and is 4.3 from the terminus of the line at Kanaya Station.

== Station layout ==
The station has a single side platform. There is no station building and the station is unattended.

== Adjacent stations ==
| « | Service | » |
Ōigawa Railway
Ōigawa Main Line
SL Express: Does not stop at this station
| Daikanchō | Local | Gōkaku |

== Station history ==
Higiri Station was opened on July 23, 1985.

== Passenger statistics ==
In fiscal 2017, the station was used by an average of 8 passengers daily (boarding passengers only).

== Surrounding area ==
- Japan National Route 473

== See also ==
- List of railway stations in Japan
