= Ieyama Station =

Railway station in Shimada, Shizuoka Prefecture, Japan

Ieyama Station 家山駅
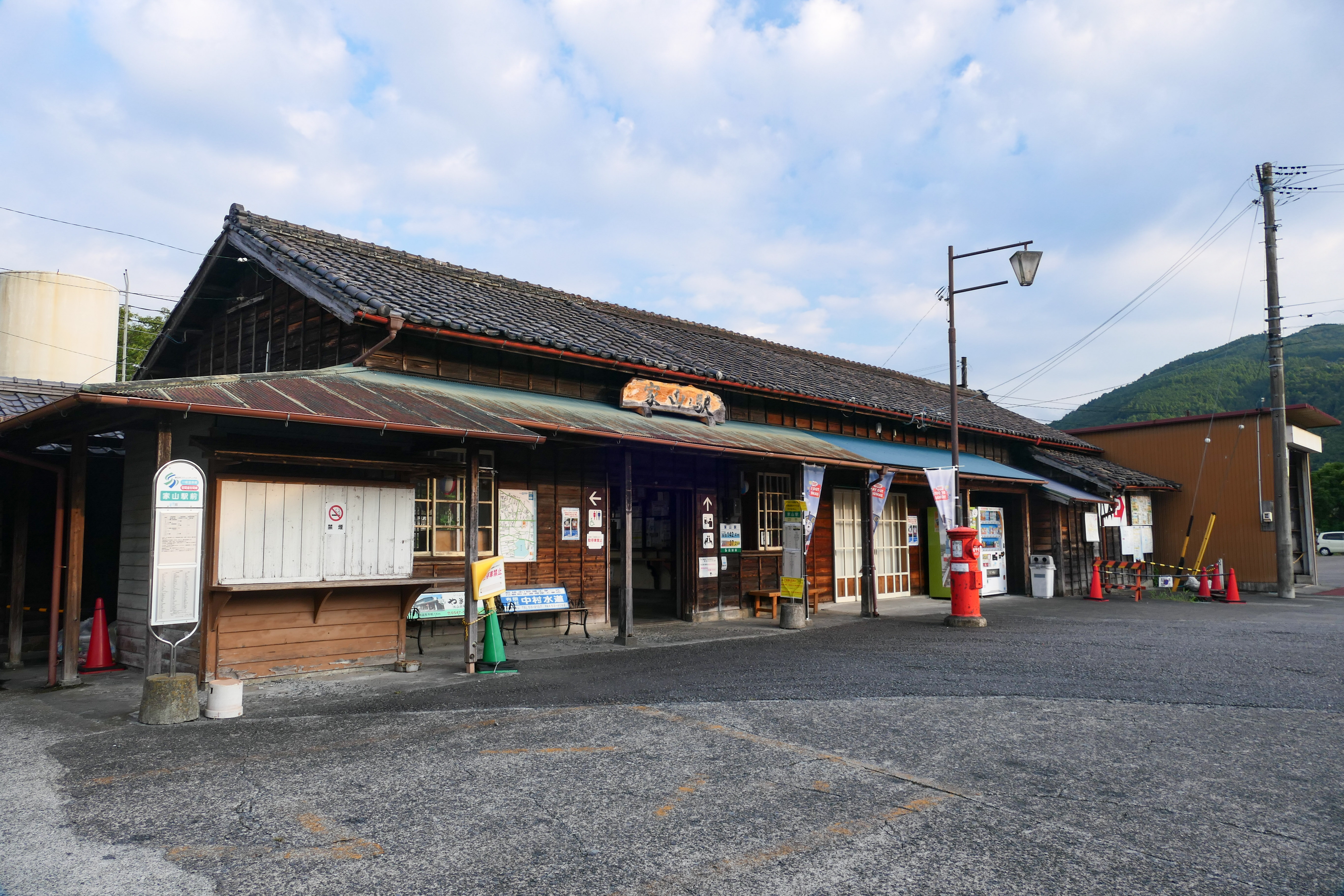
- Ieyama Station, August 2024

General information
- Location: Kawane-cho, Ieyama Oshima-shinchi, Shimada-shi, Shizuoka-ken; Japan
- Coordinates: 34°56′26.28″N 138°4′40.04″E
- Operator: Ōigawa Railway
- Line: ■Ōigawa Main Line
- Distance: 17.1 kilometers from Kanaya
- Platforms: 1 island platform

Other information
- Status: Staffed

History
- Opened: December 1, 1929

Passengers
- FY2017: 167 daily
Location
- Location within Shizuoka Prefecture Location within Japan

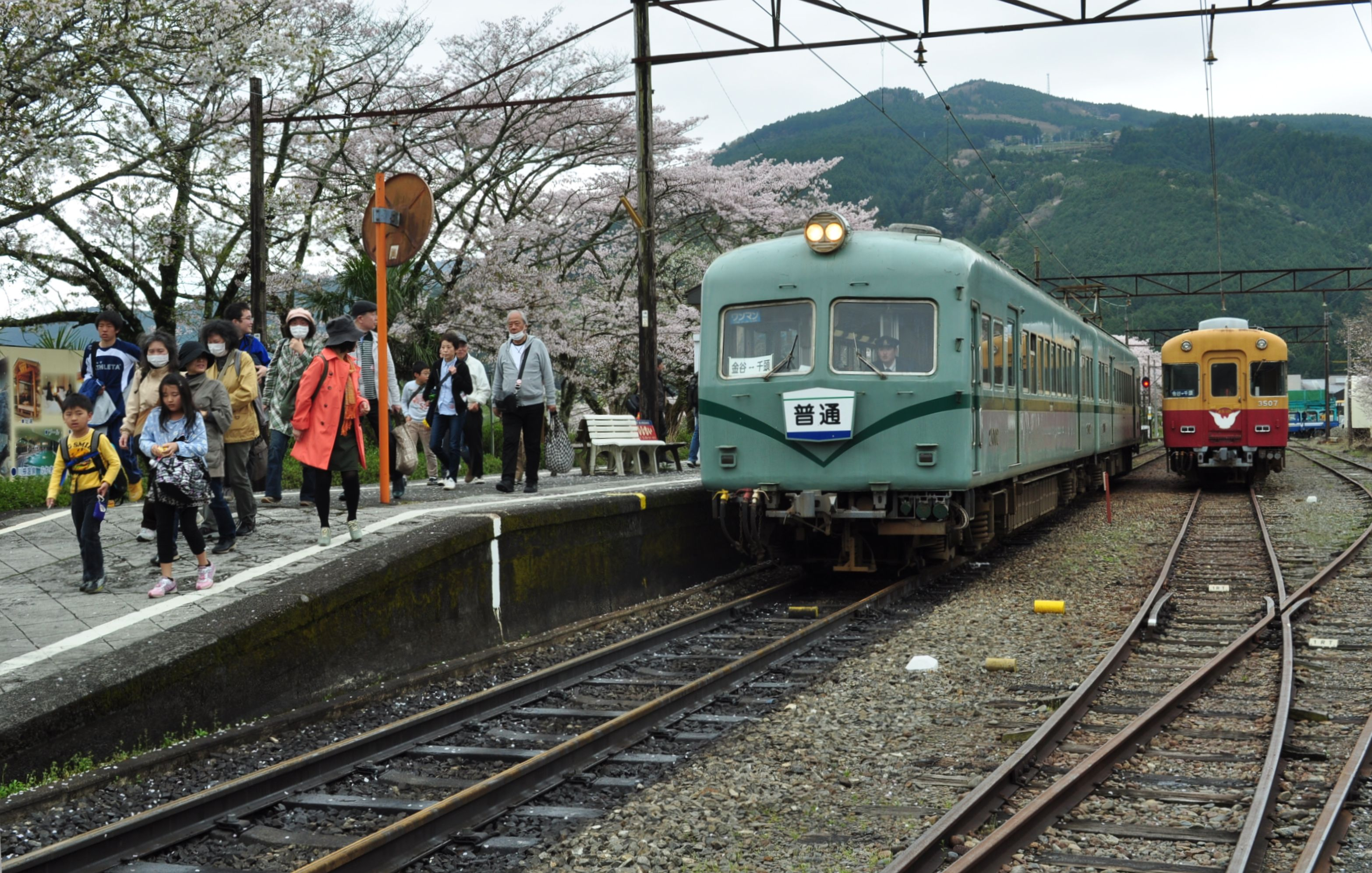
Platform

Ieyama Station (家山駅, Ieyama-eki) is a railway station in the city of Shimada, Shizuoka Prefecture, Japan, operated by the Ōigawa Railway. Its location was formerly the town of Kawane, which was merged into Shimada in 2008.

== Lines ==
Ieyama Station is on the Ōigawa Main Line and is 17.1 from the terminus of the line at Kanaya Station.

== Station layout ==
The station has a single island platform, with two headshunts on either side, connected to the station building by a level crossing. The rustic wooden station building is popular with photographers who come to shoot the steam locomotives on the line. It was also used as a location for a number of movies, including Otoko wa Tsurai yo.

== Adjacent stations ==
«	Service	»
Ōigawa Railway
Ōigawa Main Line
Shin-Kanaya	SL Express	Kawaneonsen-Sasamado
Owada	Local	Nukuri

== Station history ==
Ieyama Station was one of the original stations of the Ōigawa Main Line, and was opened on December 1, 1929.

== Passenger statistics ==
In fiscal 2017, the station was used by an average of 167 passengers daily (boarding passengers only).

== Surrounding area ==
- former Kawane Town Hall
- Kawane Junior High School
- Kawane Elementary School

== See also ==
- List of railway stations in Japan
