= Aobe Station =

Railway station in Kawanehon, Shizuoka Prefecture, Japan

Aobe Station 青部駅
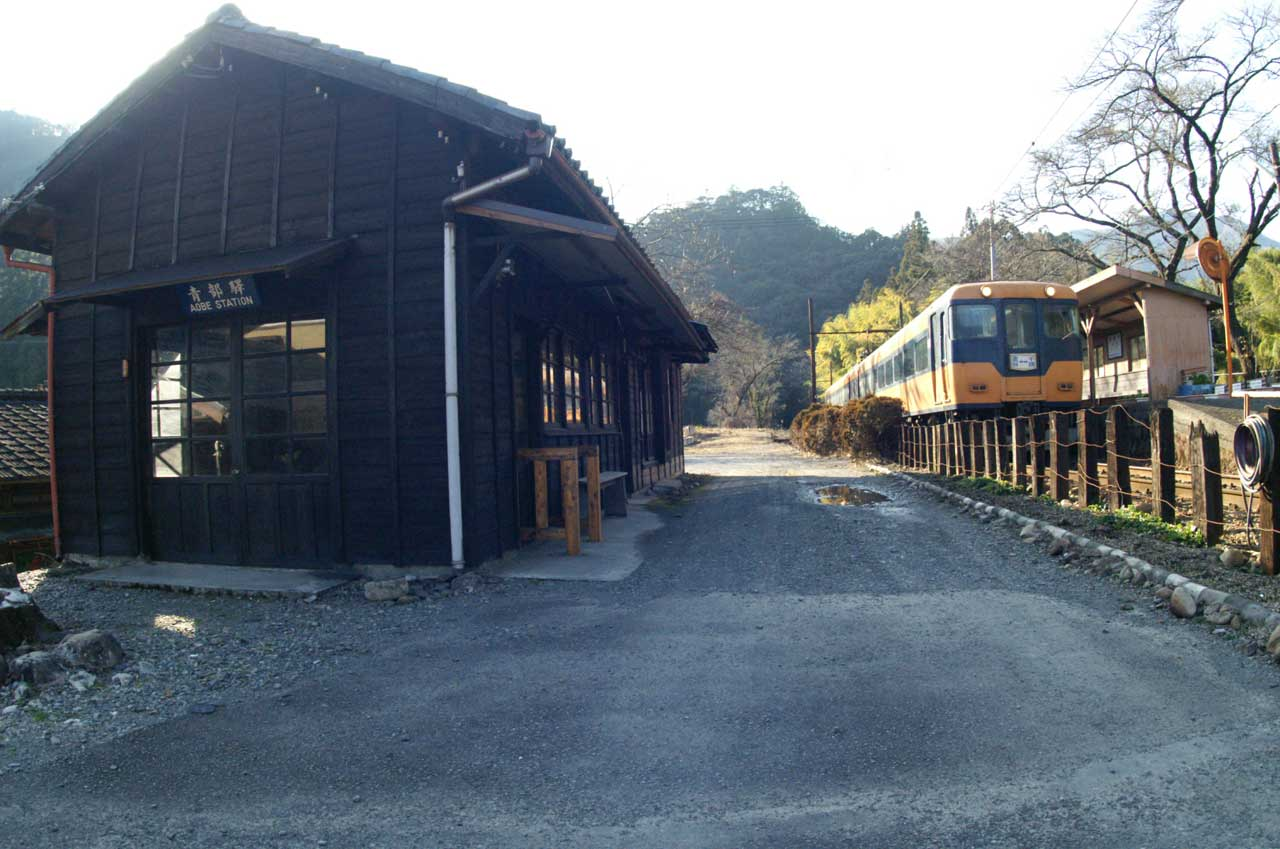
- Aobe Station in March 2008

General information
- Location: Aobe, Kawanehon-cho, Haibara-gun, Shizuoka-ken; Japan
- Coordinates: 35°05′22″N 138°06′56″E
- Operator: Ōigawa Railway
- Line: ■Ōigawa Main Line
- Distance: 26.1 kilometers from Kanaya
- Platforms: 1 side platforms

Other information
- Status: Unstaffed

History
- Opened: April 12, 1931

Passengers
- FY2017: 5 daily
Location
- Location within Shizuoka Prefecture Location within Japan

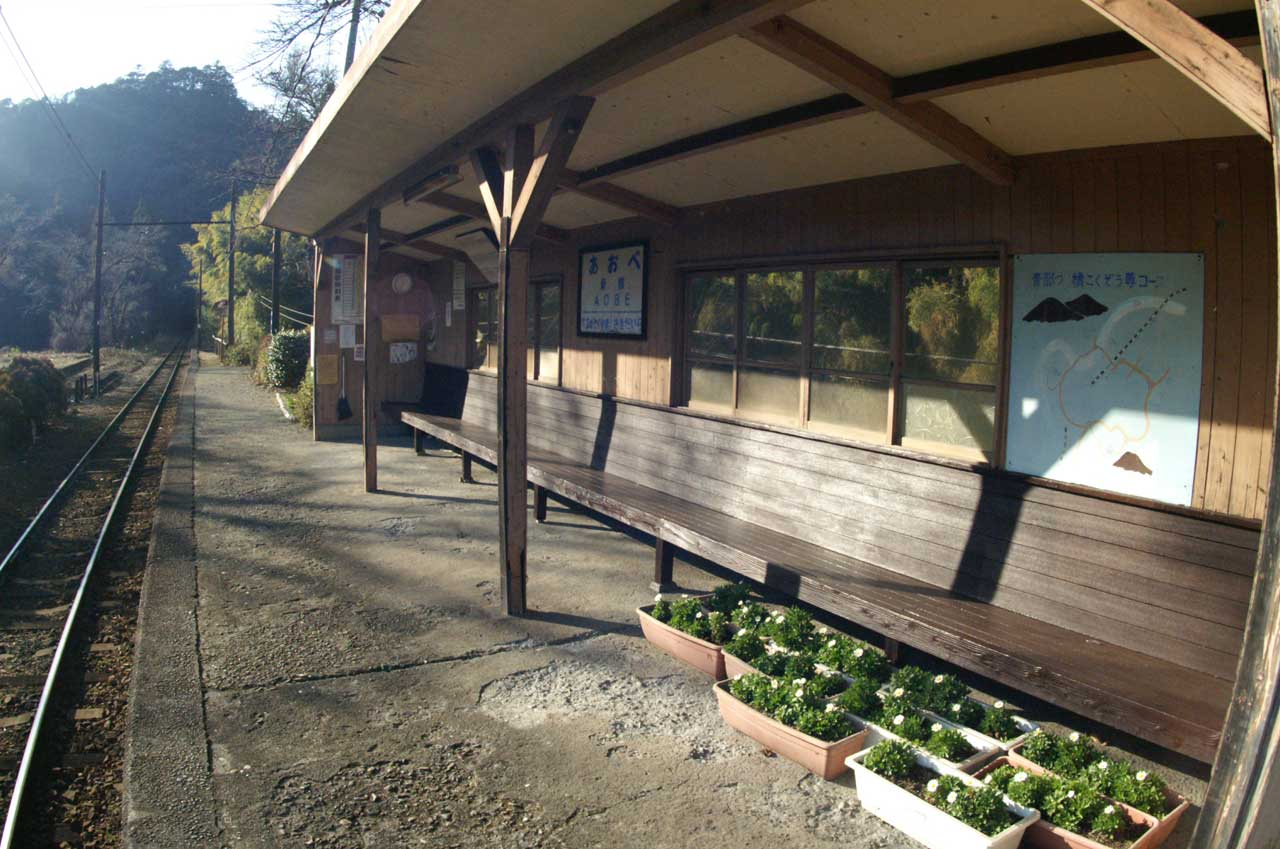
Platform

Aobe Station (青部駅, Aobe-eki) is a railway station in the town of Kawanehon, Haibara District, Shizuoka Prefecture, Japan, operated by the Ōigawa Railway.

== Lines ==
Aobe Station is served by the Ōigawa Main Line, and is located 36.1 kilometers from the official starting point of the line at Kanaya.

== Station layout ==
The station has one side platform serving a single track, adjacent to a small wooden station. The station is unattended. It retains much of the atmosphere of the early Shōwa period and is often used as a set for movies and TV dramas, including the 1975 police drama Castle of Sand.

== Adjacent stations ==
| « | Service | » |
Ōigawa Railway
Ōigawa Main Line
SL Express: Does not stop at this station
| Suruga-Tokuyama | Local | Sakidaira |

== Station history ==
Aobe Station was one of the original stations of the Ōigawa Main Line, and was opened on April 12, 1931.

== Passenger statistics ==
In fiscal 2017, the station was used by an average of 5 passengers daily (boarding passengers only).

== Surrounding area ==
- Japan National Route 362

== See also ==
- List of railway stations in Japan
