= Sakidaira Station =

Railway station in Kawanehon, Shizuoka Prefecture, Japan

Sakidaira Station 崎平駅
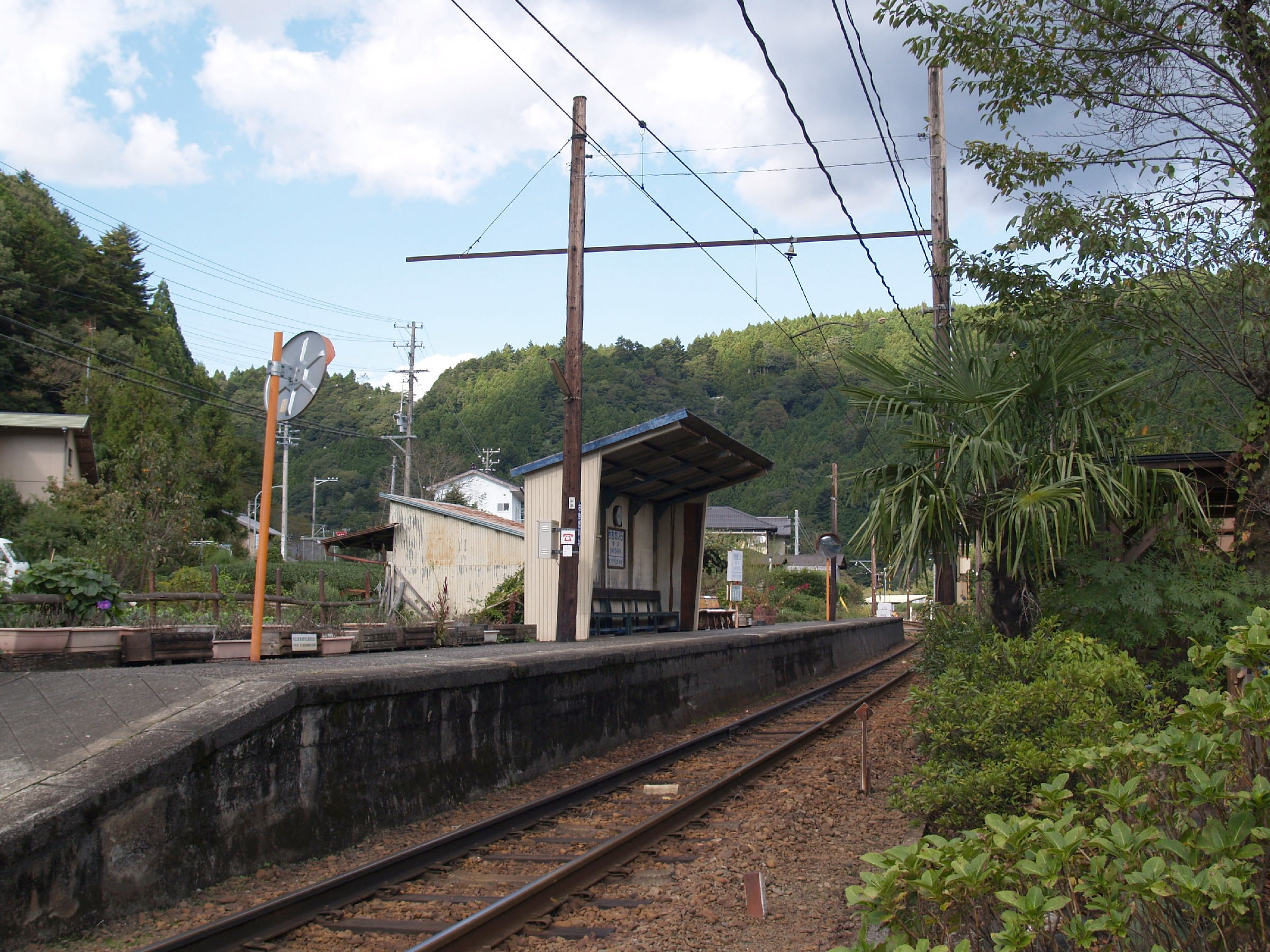
- Sakidaira Station in October 2009

General information
- Location: Sakidaira, Kawanehon-cho, Haibara-gun, Shizuoka-ken; Japan
- Coordinates: 35°05′31″N 138°07′39″E
- Operator: Ōigawa Railway
- Line: ■Ōigawa Main Line
- Distance: 37.2 kilometers from Kanaya
- Platforms: 1 side platforms

Other information
- Status: Unstaffed

History
- Opened: December 1, 1931

Passengers
- FY2017: 7 daily
Location
- Location within Shizuoka Prefecture Location within Japan

Sakidaira Station (崎平駅, Sakidaira-eki) is a railway station in the town of Kawanehon, Haibara District, Shizuoka Prefecture, Japan, operated by the Ōigawa Railway.

== Lines ==
Sakidaira Station is served by the Ōigawa Main Line, and is located 37.2 kilometers from the official starting point of the line at Kanaya.

== Station layout ==
The station has one side platform serving a single track, connected to a small wooden station building. The station is unattended.

== Adjacent stations ==
«	Service	»
Ōigawa Railway
Ōigawa Main Line
SL Express: Does not stop at this station
Aobe	Local	Senzu

== Station history ==
Sakidaira Station was one of the original stations of the Ōigawa Main Line, and was opened on December 1, 1931.

== Passenger statistics ==
In fiscal 2017, the station was used by an average of 7 passengers daily (boarding passengers only).

== Surrounding area ==
- Japan National Route 362

== See also ==
- List of Railway Stations in Japan
