= Kamio =

Kamio (written: 神尾 lit. "god tail") is a Japanese surname. Notable people with the surname include:

- Jōji Kamio (神尾 丈治), Japanese writer
- Mayuko Kamio (神尾 真由子; born 1986), Japanese violinist
- Kamio Mitsuomi (神尾 光臣; 1856–1927), Japanese Imperial Army general
- Naoko Kamio (神尾 直子; born 1967), Japanese actress
- Yoko Kamio (神尾 葉子; born 1966), Japanese manga artist and writer
- Yone Kamio (神尾 米; born 1971), Japanese tennis player
- Fuju Kamio (神尾楓珠; born 1999), Japanese actor

== Fictional Characters ==
- Misuzu Kamio (神尾観鈴), character from the visual novel and anime Air

== See also ==
- Kamio Station, a railway station in Shizuoka Prefecture, Japan
