= Shimoizumi Station =

Railway station in Kawanehon, Shizuoka Prefecture, Japan

Shimoizumi Station 下泉駅
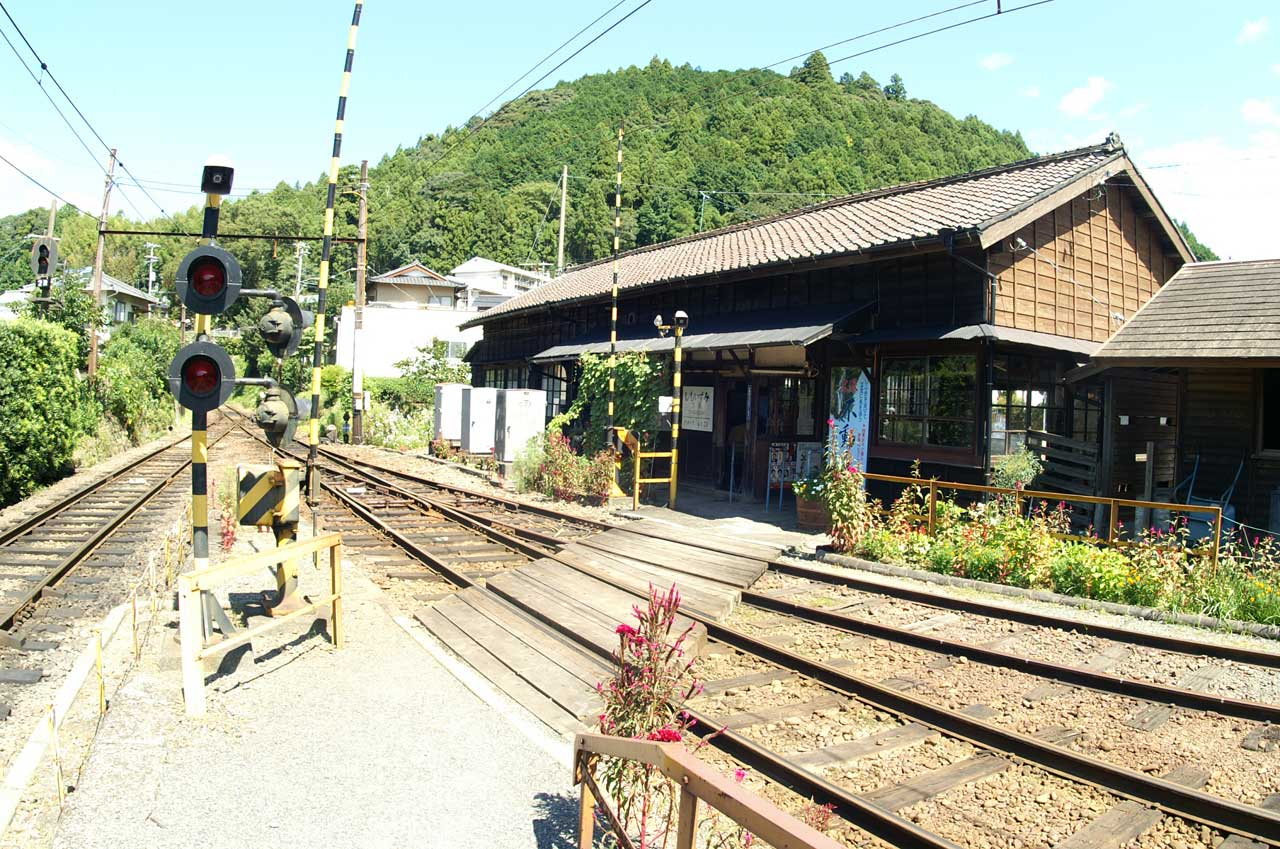
- Shimoizumi Station in March 2008

General information
- Location: Shimoizumi, Kawanehon-cho, Haibara-gun, Shizuoka-ken; Japan
- Coordinates: 35°01′20″N 138°05′24″E
- Operator: Ōigawa Railway
- Line: ■Ōigawa Main Line
- Distance: 27.4 kilometers from Kanaya
- Platforms: 1 island platforms

Other information
- Status: Unstaffed

History
- Opened: February 1, 1931

Passengers
- FY2017: 17 daily
Location
- Location within Shizuoka Prefecture Location within Japan

Shimoizumi Station (下泉駅, Shimoizumi-eki) is a railway station in the town of Kawanehon, Haibara District, Shizuoka Prefecture, Japan, operated by the Ōigawa Railway.

== Lines ==
Shimoizumi Station is served by the Ōigawa Main Line, and is located 27.4 kilometers from the official starting point of the line at Kanaya.

== Station layout ==
The station has a single island platform connected to a small wooden station building by a level crossing. The station is unattended.

== Adjacent stations ==
«	Service	»
Ōigawa Railway
Ōigawa Main Line
Kawaneonsen-Sasamado	SL Express	Suruga-Tokuyama
Shiogō	Local	Tanokuchi

== Station history ==
Shimoizumi Station was one of the original stations of the Ōigawa Main Line, and was opened on February 1, 1931.

== Passenger statistics ==
In fiscal 2017, the station was used by an average of 17 passengers daily (boarding passengers only).

== Surrounding area ==
- Japan National Route 362

== See also ==
- List of railway stations in Japan
