= Shiogō Station =

Railway station in Kawanehon, Shizuoka Prefecture, Japan

Shiogō Station 塩郷駅
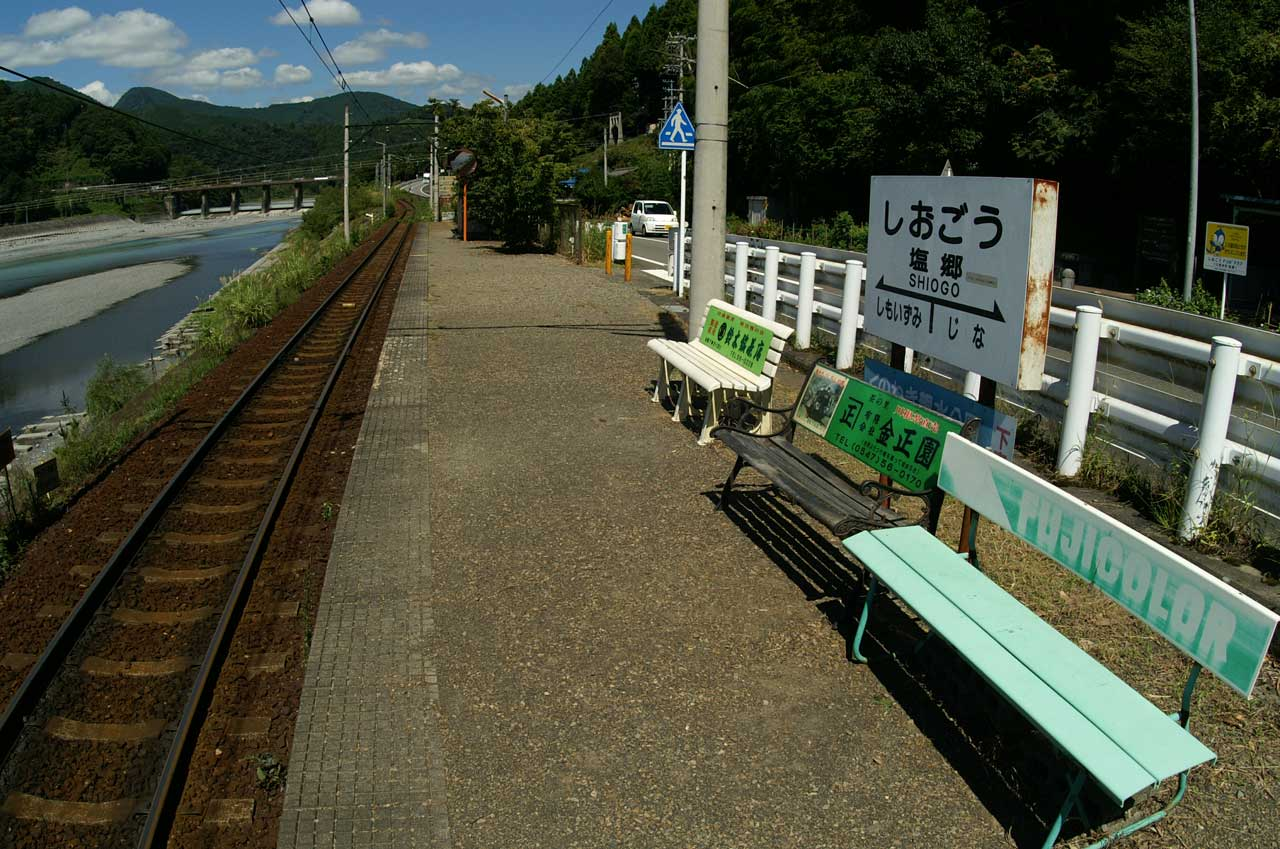
- Shiogō Station platform, March 2008

General information
- Location: Shimoizumi, Kawanehon-cho, Haibara-gun, Shizuoka-ken; Japan
- Coordinates: 34°59′51.71″N 138°5′26.16″E
- Operator: Ōigawa Railway
- Line: ■Ōigawa Main Line
- Distance: 24.3 kilometers from Kanaya
- Platforms: 1 side platforms

Other information
- Status: Unstaffed

History
- Opened: September 23, 1930

Passengers
- FY2017: 6 daily
Location
- Location within Shizuoka Prefecture Location within Japan

Shiogō Station (塩郷駅, Shiogō-eki) is a railway station in the town of Kawanehon, Haibara District, Shizuoka Prefecture, Japan, operated by the Ōigawa Railway.

== Lines ==
Shiogō Station is served by the Ōigawa Main Line, and is located 24.3 kilometers from the official starting point of the line at Kanaya.

== Station layout ==
The station has one side platform serving a single track, next to a small wooden station building. The station is unattended.

== Adjacent stations ==
«	Service	»
Ōigawa Railway
Ōigawa Main Line
SL Express: Does not stop at this station
Jina	Local	Shimoizumi

== Station history ==
Shiogō Station was one of the original stations of the Ōigawa Main Line, and was opened on September 23, 1930.

== Passenger statistics ==
In fiscal 2017, the station was used by an average of 6 passengers daily (boarding passengers only).

== Surrounding area ==
- Shiogō Dam

== See also ==
- List of railway stations in Japan
