= Daikanchō Station =

Railway station in Shimada, Shizuoka Prefecture, Japan

Daikanchō Station 代官町駅
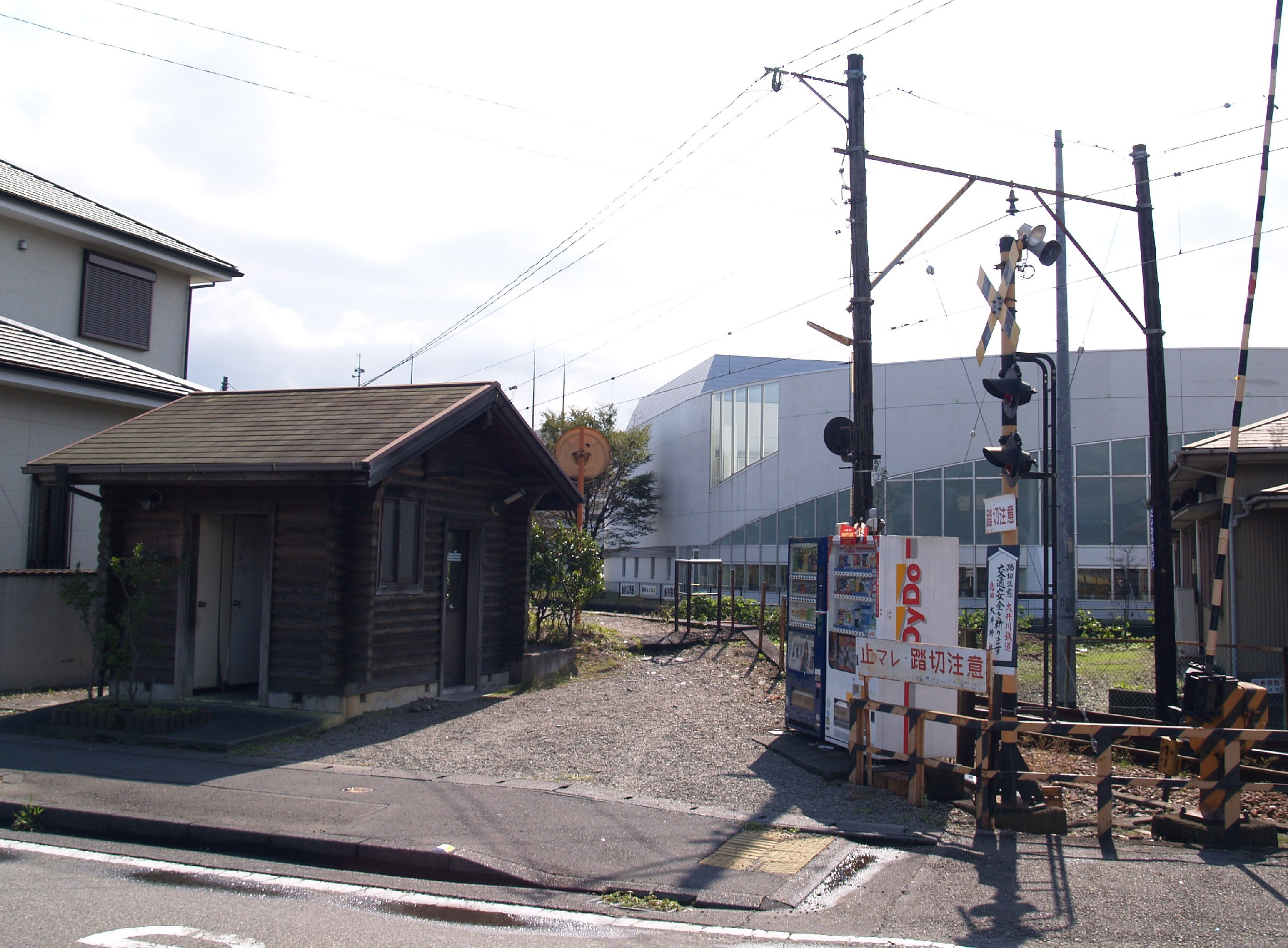
- Daikanchō Station

General information
- Location: Kanaya Kawahara, Shimada-shi, Shizuoka-ken; Japan
- Coordinates: 34°50′7.75″N 138°7′33.95″E
- Operator: Ōigawa Railway
- Line: ■Ōigawa Main Line
- Distance: 3.8 kilometers from Kanaya
- Platforms: 1 side platform

Other information
- Status: Unstaffed

History
- Opened: September 16, 1965

Passengers
- FY2017: 20 daily
Location
- Location within Shizuoka Prefecture Location within Japan

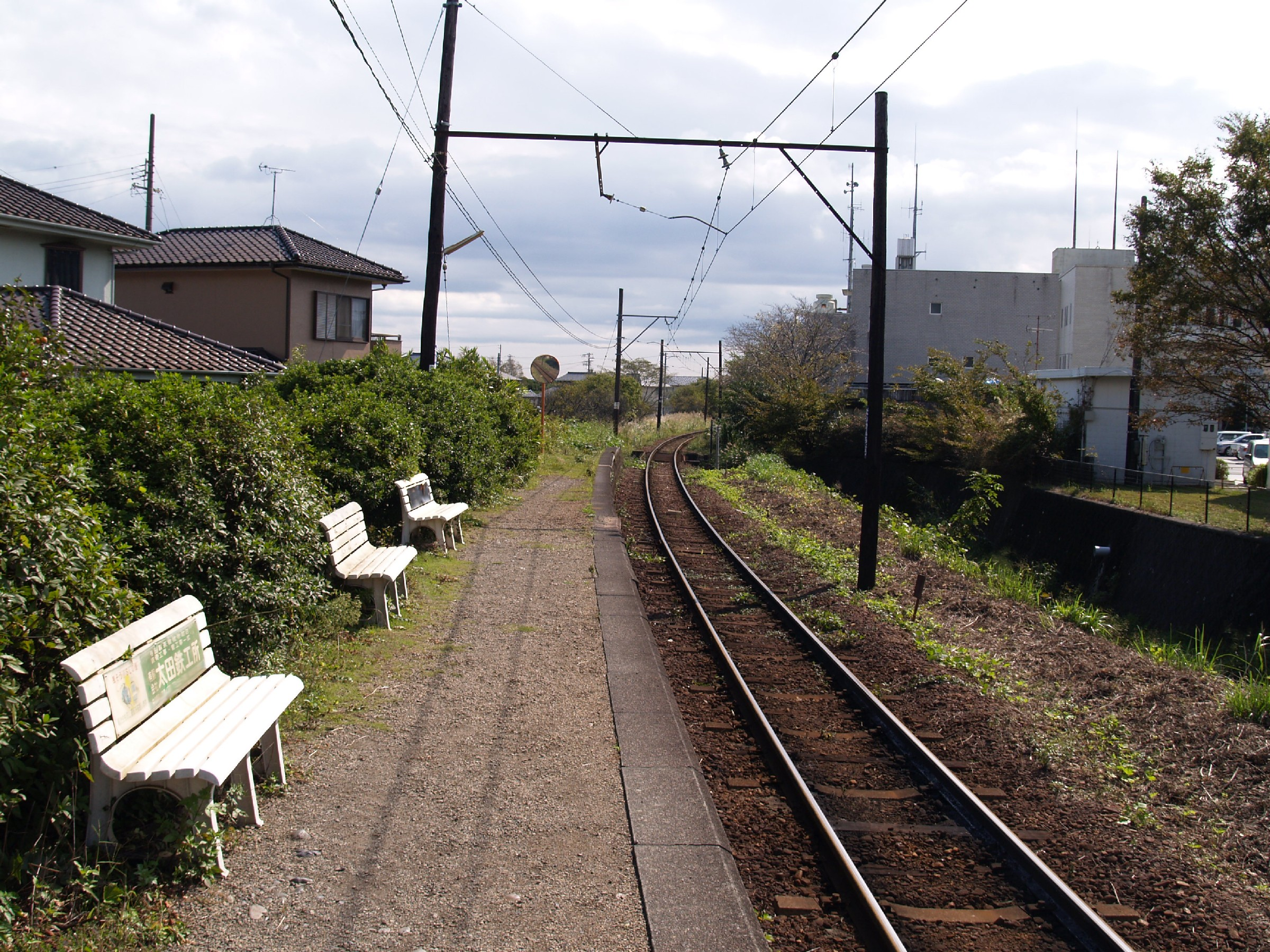
Platform

Daikanchō Station (代官町駅, Daikanchō-eki) is a railway station in the city of Shimada, Shizuoka Prefecture, Japan, operated by the Ōigawa Railway.

== Lines ==
Daikanchō Station is on the Ōigawa Main Line and is 3.8 km from the terminus of the line at Kanaya Station.

== Station layout ==
The station has a single side platform and a rustic log-cabin style wooden station building.

== Adjacent stations ==
«	Service	»
Ōigawa Railway
Ōigawa Main Line
SL Express: Does not stop at this station
Shin-Kanaya	Local	Higiri

== Station history ==
Daikanchō Station was opened on September 16, 1965.

== Passenger statistics ==
In fiscal 2017, the station was used by an average of 20 passengers daily (boarding passengers only).

== Surrounding area ==
- former Kanaya Town Hall
- Kawane Junior High School
- Kawane Elementary School

== See also ==
- List of railway stations in Japan
