= Kadode Station =

Railway station in Shimada, Japan

Kadode Station 門出駅
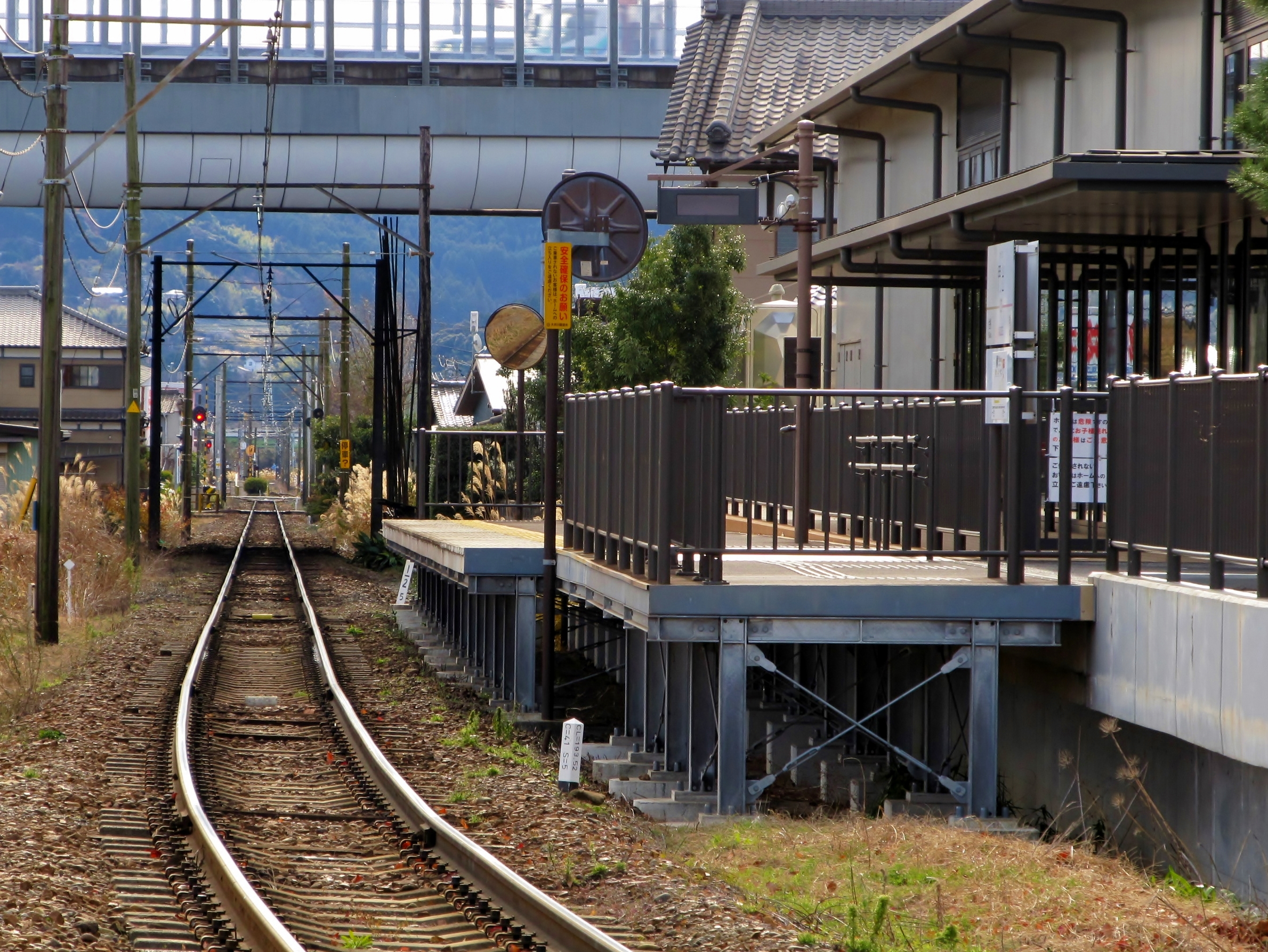
- The station platform in 2024

General information
- Location: 245-3, Yoko`oka-shinden, Shimada-shi, Shizuoka-ken; Japan
- Coordinates: 34.850059°N 138.119189°E
- Operator: Ōigawa Railway
- Line: ■Ōigawa Main Line
- Distance: 5.5 kilometers from Kanaya
- Platforms: 1 island platform

Other information
- Status: Unstaffed

History
- Opened: 12 November 2020
Location
- Location within Shizuoka Prefecture Location within Japan

Kadode Station (門出駅, Kadode-eki) is a railway station in the city of Shimada, Shizuoka Prefecture, Japan, operated by the Ōigawa Railway. Its location was formerly the town of Kanaya, which was merged into Shimada in 2005.

== Lines ==
Kadode Station is on the Ōigawa Main Line and is 5.5 km (3.4 mi) from the terminus of the line at Kanaya Station.

== History ==
On 2 August 2019, the station was planned as an information desk for sightseeing nearby Shimada-Kanaya IC on Shin-Tōmei Expressway.

On 25 September 2020, the station was named Kadode Station. On 12 November, the station opened.

== Station layout ==
The station is contiguous with Kadode Ooigawa, a commercial building. The platform is 42 m long and the station is unstaffed.

== Adjacent stations ==
| « | Service | » |
Ōigawa Railway
Ōigawa Main Line
SL Express: Does not stop at this station
| Gōkaku | Local | Kamio |

== See also ==
- List of railway stations in Japan
