= Fukuyō Station =

Railway station in Shimada, Shizuoka Prefecture, Japan

Fukuyō Station 福用駅
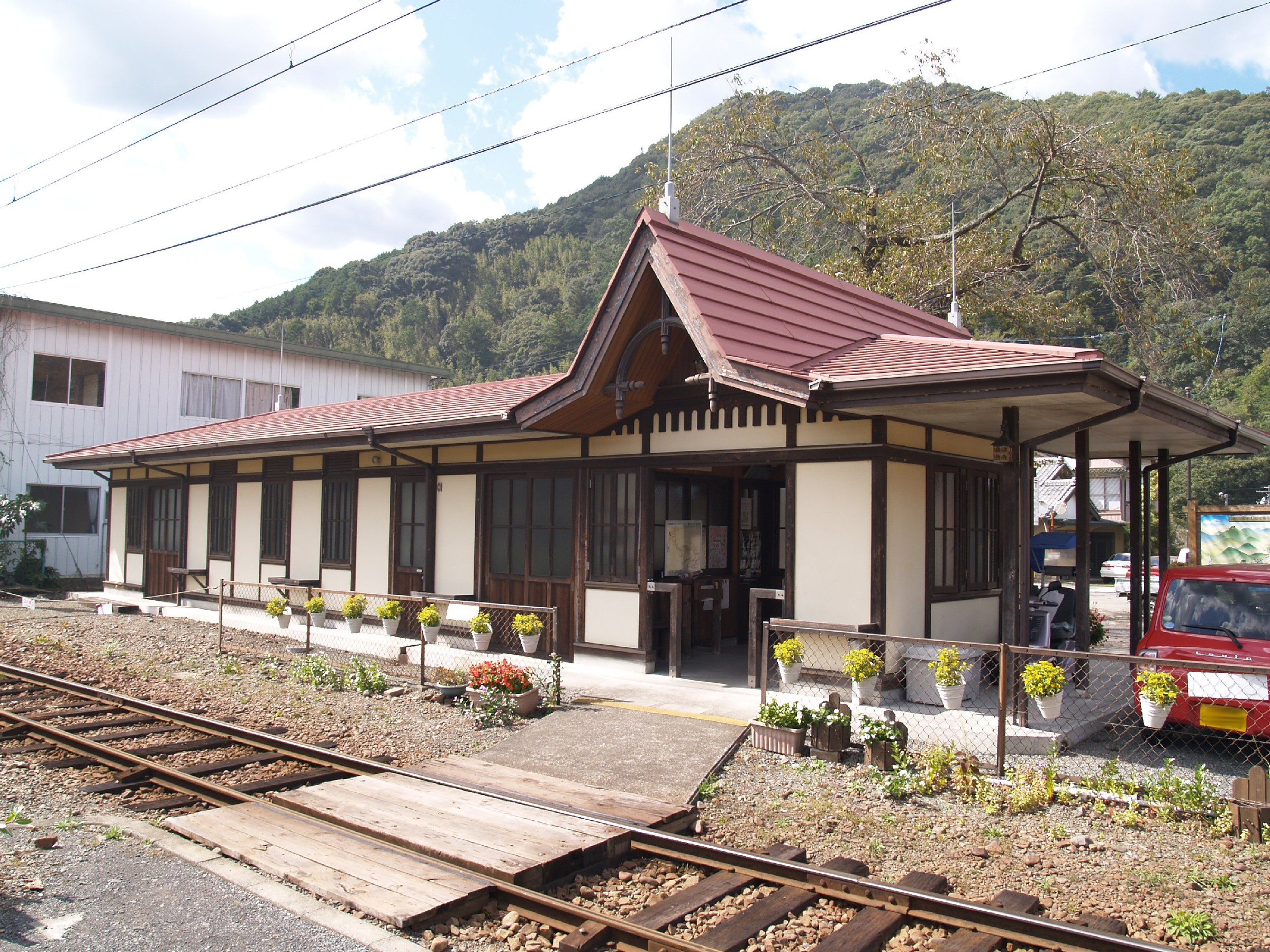
- Fukuyō Station in October 2009

General information
- Location: Fukuyō, Shimada-shi, Shizuoka-ken; Japan
- Coordinates: 34°54′4.58″N 138°5′22.44″E
- Operator: Ōigawa Railway
- Line: ■Ōigawa Main Line
- Distance: 12.3 kilometers from Kanaya
- Platforms: 1 island platform

Other information
- Status: Staffed

History
- Opened: December 1, 1929

Passengers
- FY2017: 27 daily
Location
- Location within Shizuoka Prefecture Location within Japan

Fukuyō Station (福用駅, Fukuyō-eki) is a railway station in the city of Shimada, Shizuoka Prefecture, Japan, operated by the Ōigawa Railway.

== Lines ==
Fukuyo Station is on the Ōigawa Main Line and is 12.3 km from the terminus of the line at Kanaya Station.

== Station layout ==
The station has a single island platform and a wooden passenger building connected to the platform by a level crossing. The station is staffed.

== Adjacent stations ==
«	Service	»
Ōigawa Railway
Ōigawa Main Line
SL Express: Does not stop at this station
Kamio	Local	Owada

== Station history ==
Fukuyō Station was opened on December 1, 1929. The station building was rebuilt in 1998.

== Passenger statistics ==
In fiscal 2017, the station was used by an average of 27 passengers daily (boarding passengers only).

== Surrounding area ==
- Japan National Route 473

== See also ==
- List of railway stations in Japan
