= Shimada, Shizuoka =

Shimada 島田市
- City
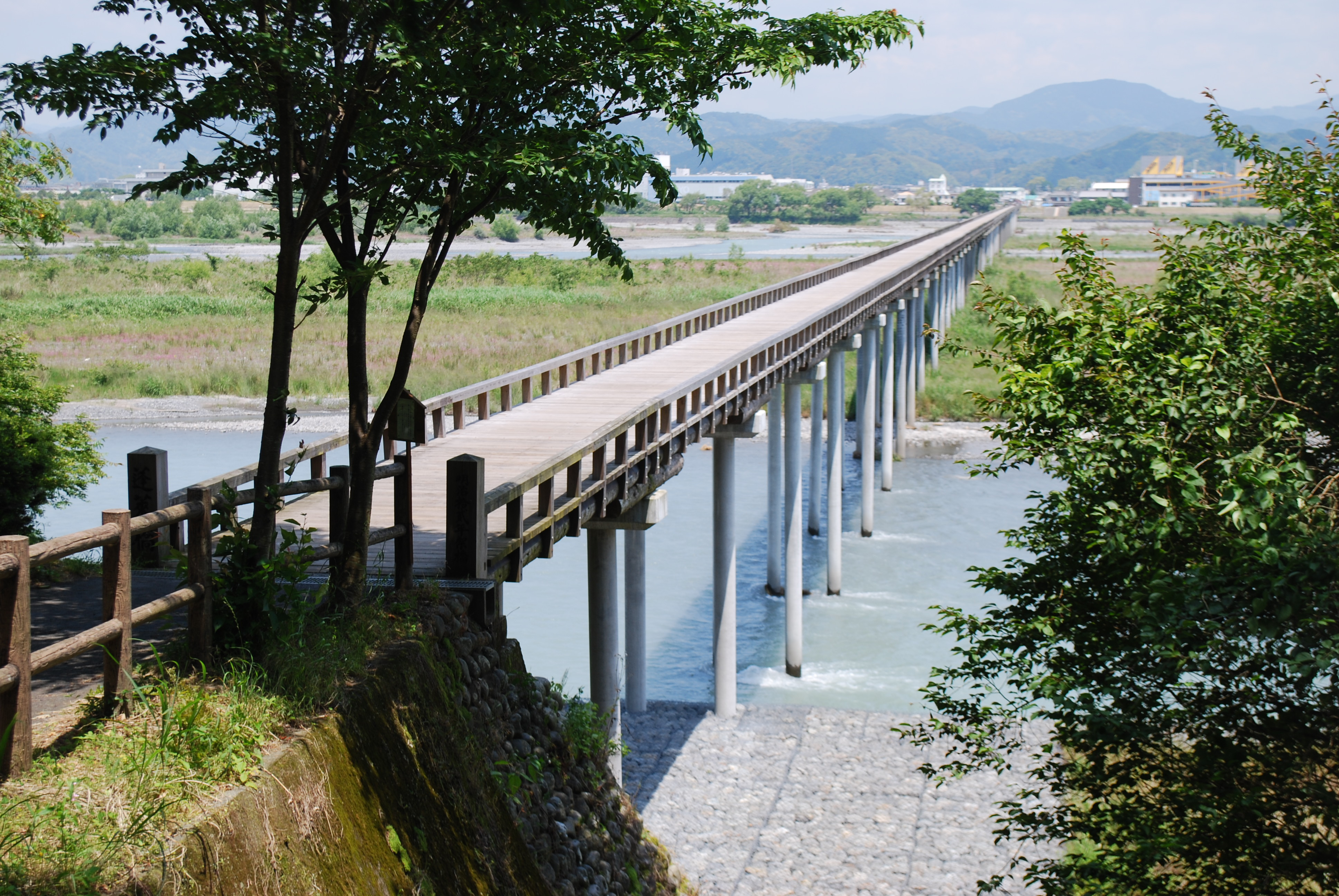
- Hōrai Bridge in Shimada

- Flag Seal

- Location of Shimada in Shizuoka Prefecture

- Coordinates: 34°50′10.6″N 138°11′33.8″E
- Country: Japan
- Region: Chūbu (Tōkai)
- Prefecture: Shizuoka

Government
  - Mayor: Someya Kinuyo

Area
  - Total: 315.70 km^{2} (121.89 sq mi)

Population (September 2023)
  - Total: 93,724
  - Density: 296.88/km^{2} (768.91/sq mi)
- Time zone: UTC+9 (Japan Standard Time)
- Symbols
  - Tree: Osmanthus
  - Flowers: Rose, azalea
  - Bird: Blue-and-white flycatcher
- Phone number: 0547-37-8200
- Address: 1-1 Chūō-chō, Shimada-shi, Shizuoka-ken 427-8501
- Website: Official website

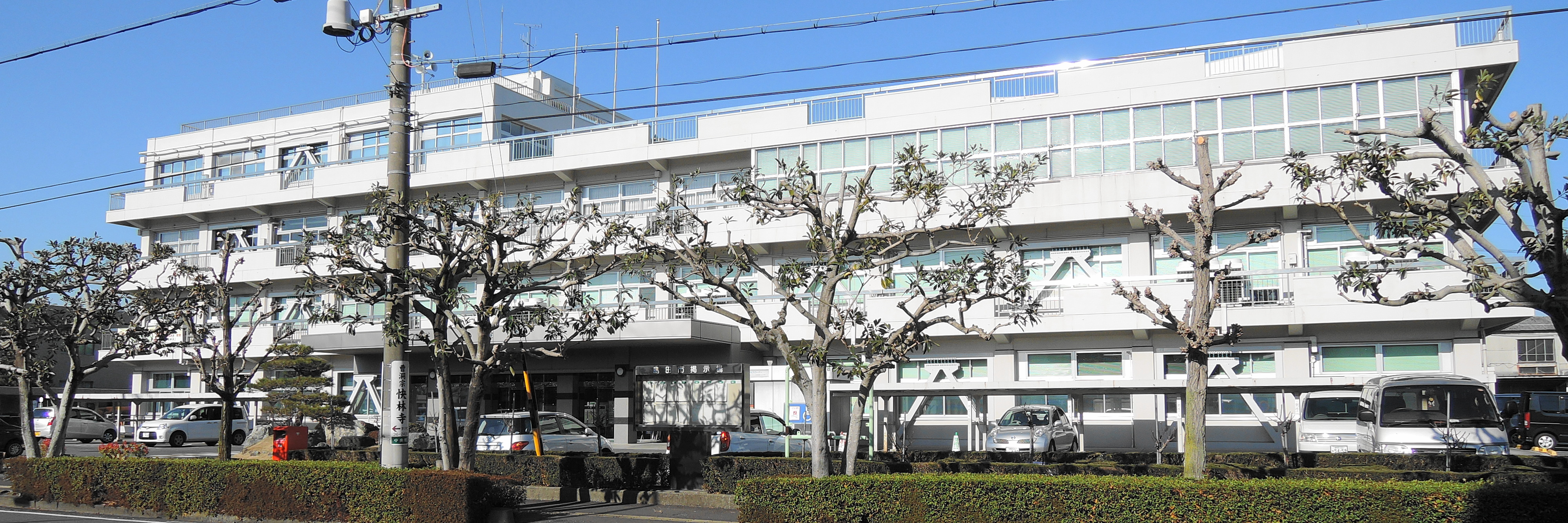
Shimada City Hall

Shimada (島田市, Shimada-shi) is a city located in Shizuoka Prefecture, Japan. The city covers an area of 315.7 square kilometres (121.9 sq mi). It had an estimated population in September 2023 of 93,724, giving a population density of about 300 persons per km^{2}.

== Geography ==
Shimada is located in the Shida Plains of west-central Shizuoka Prefecture. It is located on both banks of the Ōi River. The area enjoys a warm maritime climate with hot, humid summers and mild, cool winters.

=== Surrounding municipalities ===
Shizuoka Prefecture

- Aoi-ku, Shizuoka
- Fujieda
- Kakegawa
- Kawanehon, Haibara District
- Kikugawa
- Makinohara
- Mori, Shuchi District
- Tenryū-ku, Hamamatsu
- Yaizu
- Yoshida, Haibara District

== Demographics ==
Per Japanese census data, the population of Shimada has remained steady over the past 50 years.

Historical population
Year	Pop.	±%
1940	68,753	—
1950	86,704	+26.1%
1960	94,272	+8.7%
1970	96,613	+2.5%
1980	100,519	+4.0%
1990	103,149	+2.6%
2000	102,585	−0.5%
2010	100,250	−2.3%

=== Climate ===
The city has a climate characterized by hot and humid summers, and relatively mild winters (Köppen climate classification Cfa). The average annual temperature in Shimada is 15.7 °C. The average annual rainfall is 2142 mm with September as the wettest month. The temperatures are highest on average in August, at around 26.5 °C, and lowest in January, at around 5.2 °C.

== History ==
Shimada (Kanaya) began as an outlying fortification to Kakegawa Castle erected by Yamauchi Kazutoyo in the Sengoku period to control the crossing of the Ōi River. In the Edo period, Kanaya-juku and Shimada-juku developed as post towns on the Tōkaidō highway connecting Edo with Kyoto. The area was mostly tenryō territory under direct control of the Tokugawa shogunate with a daikansho based at a Jinya located within Shimada-juku. As the Tokugawa shogunate forbade the construction of any bridge or establishment of a ferry service on the Ōi River for defensive purposes, travellers were often detained at either Shimada or Kanaya for days, sometimes weeks, waiting for the river levels to fall to fordable levels. The first bridge (the Hōrai Bridge) across the river connected these two towns in 1879, after the Meiji Restoration.

With the establishment of the modern municipalities system in the early Meiji period in 1889, Kanaya Town was created within Haibara District, and Shimada Town within Shida District. On April 16, 1889, the two towns were connected by rail, with the opening of Shimada Station on the Tōkaidō Main Line.

Shimada was elevated to city status on January 1, 1948. On January 1, 1955, it annexed neighboring Rokugō Village, Ōtsu Village, Daichō Village and a portion of Ikumi Village. On June 1, 1961, it further expanded through annexation of Hatsukura Village.

On May 1, 2005, the town of Kanaya (from Haibara District) was merged into Shimada.

On April 1, 2008, the town of Kawane (also from Haibara District) was also merged into Shimada.

On March 15, 2012, the city became the second municipality, after Tokyo, outside Tōhoku to accept debris from the 2011 Tōhoku earthquake and tsunami for disposal in the town's incinerators. Other cities had been reluctant to accept debris from the disaster, in spite of being asked to help recovery efforts, because of fears that the debris were contaminated by radiation from the Fukushima Daiichi nuclear disaster.

== Government ==
Shimada has a mayor-council form of government with a directly elected mayor and a unicameral city legislature of 20 members. The city contributes two members to the Shizuoka Prefectural Assembly.

== Economy ==
The economy of Shimada is primarily agricultural, with green tea as the main crop. Light industries of Shimada include factories for the production of automobile components.

== Education ==
Shimada has 18 public elementary schools and seven middle schools operated by the city government and one middle school operated by the national government. The city has four public high schools operated by the Shizuoka Prefectural Board of Education, and one private high school. The prefecture also operates one special education school for the handicapped.

== Transportation ==
=== Railway ===
- Central Japan Railway Company - Tōkaidō Main Line
  - Rokugo - Shimada- Kanaya
- Ōigawa Railway Ōigawa Main Line
  - Kanaya • Shin-Kanaya • Daikanchō • Higiri • Gōkaku • Kadode • Kamio • Fukuyō • Owada • Ieyama • Nukuri • Kawaneonsen-Sasamado

=== Highway ===
- Tōmei Expressway
- Shin-Tōmei Expressway
- National Route 1
- National Route 473

=== Airport ===
- Shizuoka Airport

== International relations ==
Shimada is twinned with the following cities:

- Brienz, Switzerland, from August 10, 1996
- Himi, Toyama, Japan, from April 15, 1987
- Huzhou, Zhejiang, China, from May 1987
- Richmond, California, United States, from December 1961. There is currently a student exchange program between Shimada and Richmond.

== Local attractions ==
- Hōrai Bridge
- Ōigawa Railway
- Suwahara Castle ruins, a National Historic Site

== Notable people from Shimada ==
- Masafumi Gotō, musician
- Tarzan Goto, professional wrestler
- Horiyoshi III, Irezumi tattoo artist
- Hub, professional wrestler
- Takahiro Kawamura, professional football player
- Kayoko Kishimoto, actress
- Hokuto Matsumura, member of idol group SixTONES
- Sho Naruoka, professional football player
- Minato Oike, BMX freestyle cyclist
- Hirotoki Onozawa, professional rugby player
- Masaki Yamamoto, professional football player
