= Kamio Station =

Railway station in Shimada, Shizuoka Prefecture, Japan

Kamio Station 神尾駅
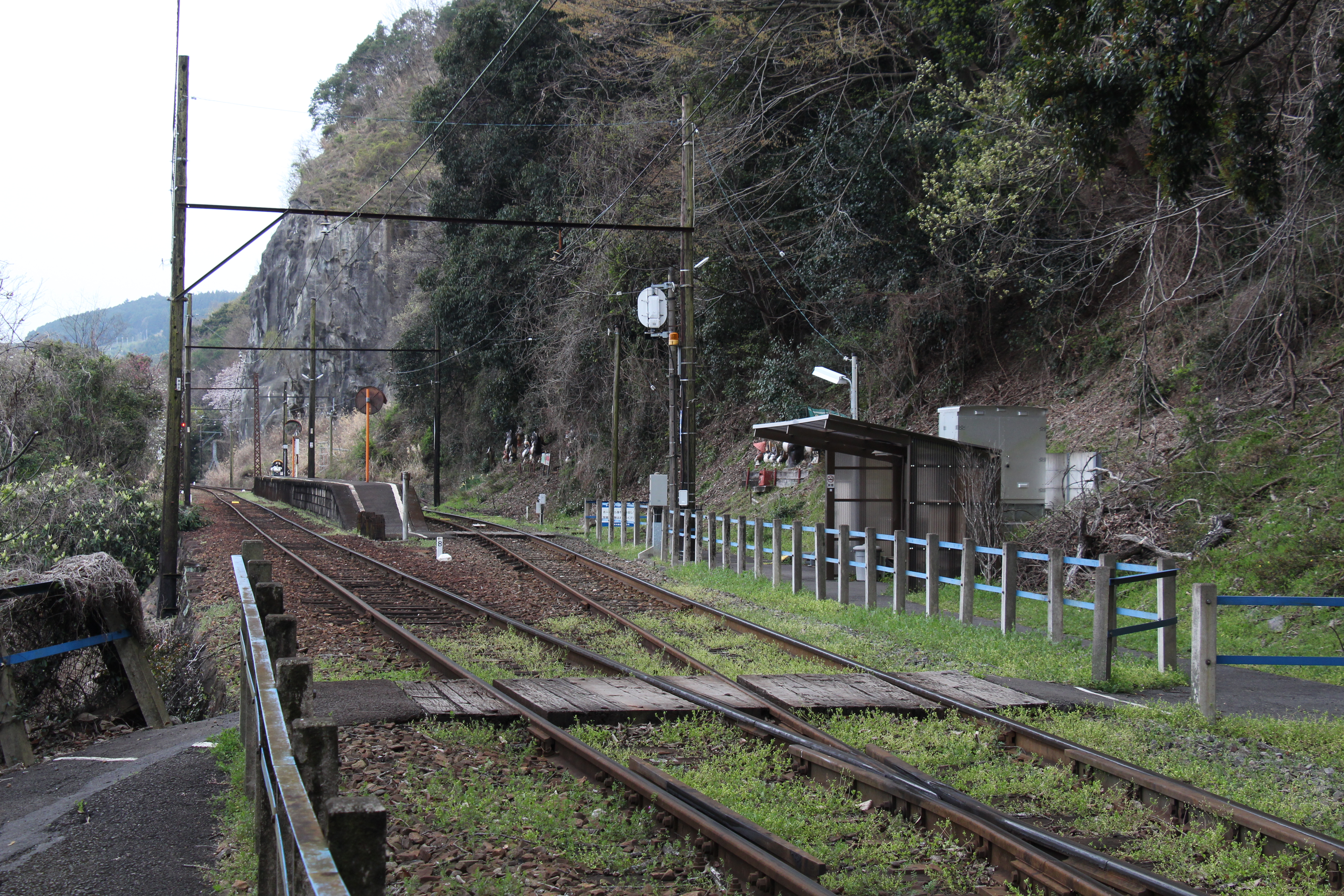
- Kamio Station In March 2020

General information
- Location: Kamio, Shimada-shi, Shizuoka-ken; Japan
- Coordinates: 34°52′58.65″N 138°6′5.87″E
- Operator: Ōigawa Railway
- Line: ■Ōigawa Main Line
- Distance: 9.8 kilometers from Kanaya
- Platforms: 1 side platform

Other information
- Status: Unstaffed

History
- Opened: December 1, 1929

Passengers
- FY2017: 2 daily
Location
- Location within Shizuoka Prefecture Location within Japan

Kamio Station (神尾駅, Kamio-eki) is a railway station in the city of Shimada, Shizuoka Prefecture, Japan, operated by the Ōigawa Railway.

== Lines ==
Kamio Station is on the Ōigawa Main Line and is 9.8 from the terminus of the line at Kanaya Station.

== Station layout ==
The station has a single island platform with a wooden passenger shelter. There is no station building, and the station is unattended.

== Adjacent stations ==
«	Service	»
Ōigawa Railway
Ōigawa Main Line
SL Express: Does not stop at this station
Kadode	Local	Fukuyō

.

== Station history ==
Kamio Station was one of the original stations of the Ōigawa Main Line and was opened on July 20, 1928.

== Passenger statistics ==
In fiscal 2017, the station was used by an average of 2 passengers daily (boarding passengers only).

== Surrounding area ==
The station is located in an isolated rural area near the Oi River

== See also ==
- List of railway stations in Japan
