= Ōigawa Main Line =

Railway line in Shizuoka prefecture, Japan

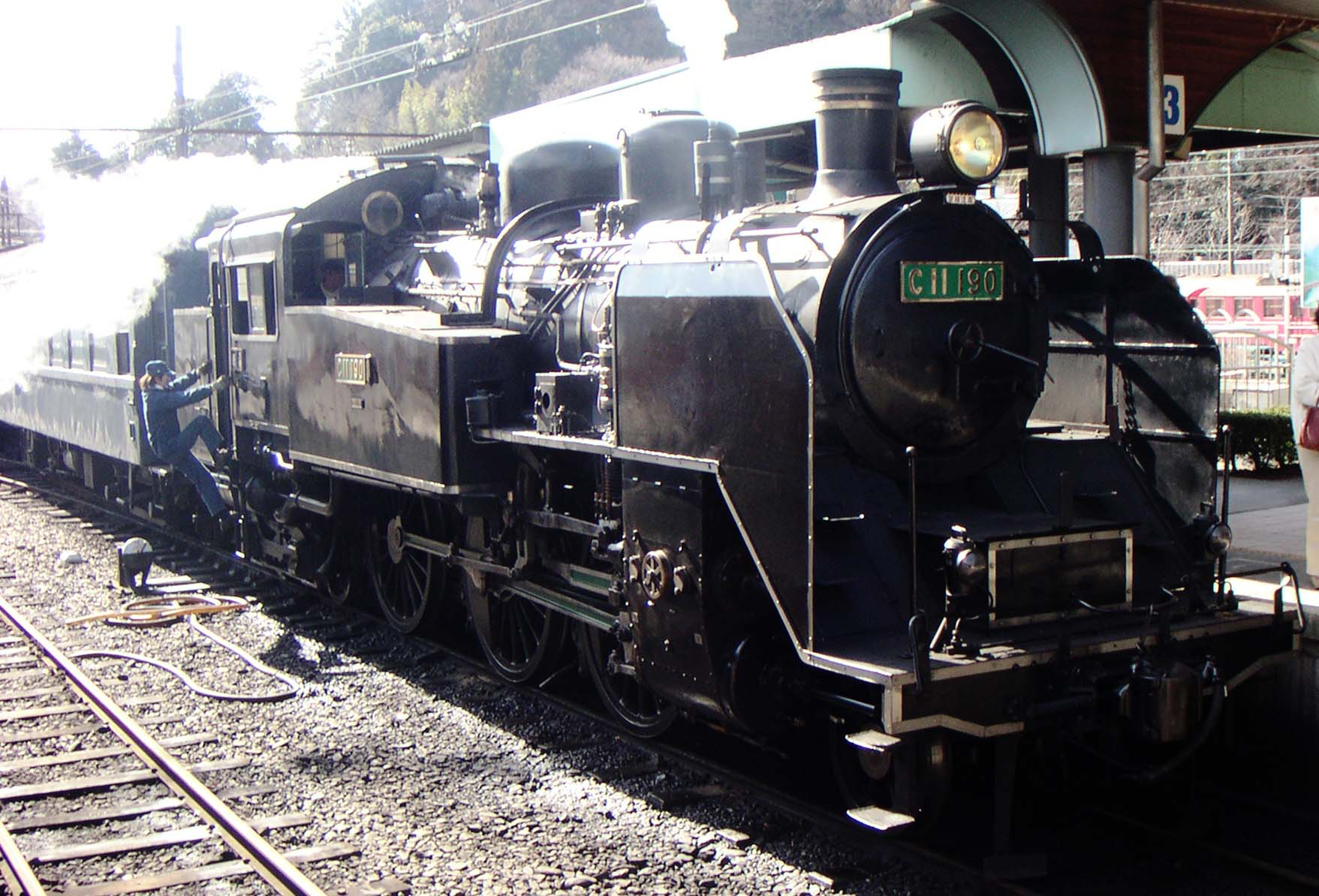
- C11 190 at Senzu Station in 2005

Overview
- Locale: Shizuoka Prefecture
- Termini: Kanaya; Senzu
- Stations: 20

Service
- Type: Heavy rail
- Operator: Ōigawa Railway

History
- Opened: 1927

Technical
- Line length: 39.5 km
- Track gauge: 1,067 mm (3 ft 6 in)
- Electrification: 1,500 V DC overhead

The Ōigawa Main Line (大井川本線, Ōigawa honsen) is a Japanese railway line which connects Kanaya Station in Shimada, Shizuoka Prefecture with Senzu Station in Kawanehon, Haibara District, Shizuoka Prefecture. It is owned and operated by the private railway operator Ōigawa Railway.

In September 2022, the Ōigawa Main Line suffered substantial damage from Tropical Storm Talas. Rail services between Kawane-Onsen Sasamado and Senzu Station were suspended until further notice. In 2024, Oigawa Railway's president, Akira Torizuka, set a goal of restoring the full Ōigawa Main Line by 2029.

== History ==
The Ōigawa Main Line began operations on June 10, 1927 as a private line for the Ōigawa Electric Company, to carry workers and materials upstream to facilitate dam construction. The single-track line was extended from Kanaya in stages, reaching it current terminal station of Senzu on December 1, 1931.

The entire line was electrified on November 18, 1949, with EMUs for the passenger services commencing then and freight operation by electric locomotives beginning in August 1951. Express train operations commenced in 1971.

The line runs through an isolated mountain area with no cities or towns, and has a very small population density. Most of the passengers are tourists visiting one of the hot spring resorts along the line, or alpinists and hikers heading for the peaks of the Southern Alps National Park. To boost ridership and popularity of the line, steam locomotives were restored from July 9, 1976. A variety of historical locomotives and carriages are used, both for the steam and for the electric services, making the line a favourite with train enthusiasts and photographers.

Freight services ceased in 1983.

In September 2022, the Ōigawa Main Line suffered substantial damage from Tropical Storm Talas. Rail services between Kawane-Onsen Sasamado and Senzu Station were suspended until further notice, and steam locomotives were changed to only operate between Shin-Kanaya and Kawane-Onsen Sasamado. Ōigawa Railway advises customers intending to travel beyond Ieyama Station, i.e. to the Ikawa Line, towards Senzu and the Sumata Gorge area, to transfer to Kawanehon Town's community buses at Ieyama Station, which provide connections to Senzu Station.

== Stations ==
●: Always stops
◇: Occasionally stops
｜: Passes

Name		Distance (km)	SL Express	Local trains	Transfers	Location	Notes
Kanaya	金谷	0.0	●	●	■ Tokaido Main Line	Shimada, Shizuoka	Currently operating section
Shin-Kanaya	新金谷	2.3	●	●		Shimada, Shizuoka	Currently operating section
Daikanchō	代官町	3.8	｜	●		Shimada, Shizuoka	Currently operating section
Higiri	日切	4.3	｜	●		Shimada, Shizuoka	Currently operating section
Gōkaku	合格	5.0	｜	●		Shimada, Shizuoka	Currently operating section
Kadode	門出	5.5	｜	●		Shimada, Shizuoka	Currently operating section
Kamio	神尾	9.8	｜	●		Shimada, Shizuoka	Currently operating section
Fukuyō	福用	12.3	｜	●		Shimada, Shizuoka	Currently operating section
Owada	大和田	14.8	｜	●		Shimada, Shizuoka	Currently operating section
Ieyama	家山	17.1	●	●	Kawanehon-cho community bus	Shimada, Shizuoka	Currently operating section
Nukuri	抜里	18.8	｜	●		Shimada, Shizuoka	Currently operating section
Kawaneonsen-Sasamado	川根温泉笹間渡	20.0	◇	●		Shimada, Shizuoka	Currently operating section
~~Jina~~	地名	22.9	｜	●		Kawanehon, Haibara District, Shizuoka	Section out-of-service since September 2022
~~Shiogō~~	塩郷	24.3	｜	●		Kawanehon, Haibara District, Shizuoka	Section out-of-service since September 2022
~~Shimoizumi~~	下泉	27.4	●	●		Kawanehon, Haibara District, Shizuoka	Section out-of-service since September 2022
~~Tanokuchi~~	田野口	31.0	｜	●		Kawanehon, Haibara District, Shizuoka	Section out-of-service since September 2022
~~Suruga-Tokuyama~~	駿河徳山	34.1	●	●		Kawanehon, Haibara District, Shizuoka	Section out-of-service since September 2022
~~Aobe~~	青部	36.1	｜	●		Kawanehon, Haibara District, Shizuoka	Section out-of-service since September 2022
~~Sakidaira~~	崎平	37.2	｜	●		Kawanehon, Haibara District, Shizuoka	Section out-of-service since September 2022
~~Senzu~~	千頭	39.5	●	●	Ōigawa Railway Ikawa Line; Kawanehon-cho community bus	Kawanehon, Haibara District, Shizuoka	Section out-of-service since September 2022

== Rolling stock ==
As of 1 April 2016, the Oigawa Main Line fleet is as follows.

=== Electric multiple units ===
- 300 series 2-car EMU (former Seibu MoHa 351, stored out of use)
- 420 series 2-car EMU (former Kintetsu 6421 series, stored out of use)
- 3000 series 2-car EMU (former Keihan 3000 series, stored out of use)
- 6000 series 2-car EMU (former Nankai 6000 series)
- 7200 series 2-car EMU (former Tokyu 7200 series, purchased from Towada Electric Railway in 2015)
- 16000 series 2-car EMUs x2 (former Kintetsu 16000 series)
- 21000 series 2-car EMUs x2 (former Nankai 21000 series)
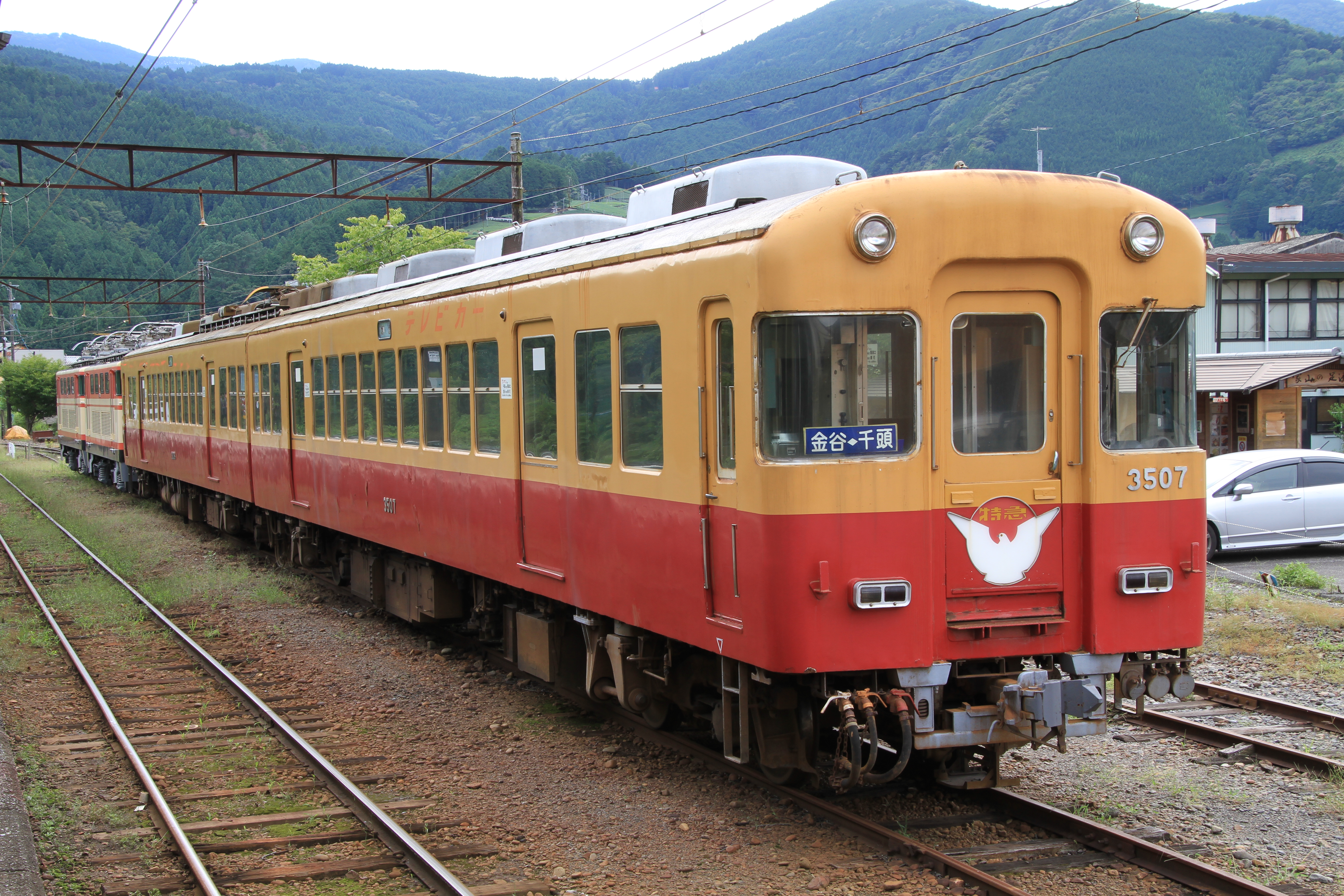
A 3000 series EMU in August 2014

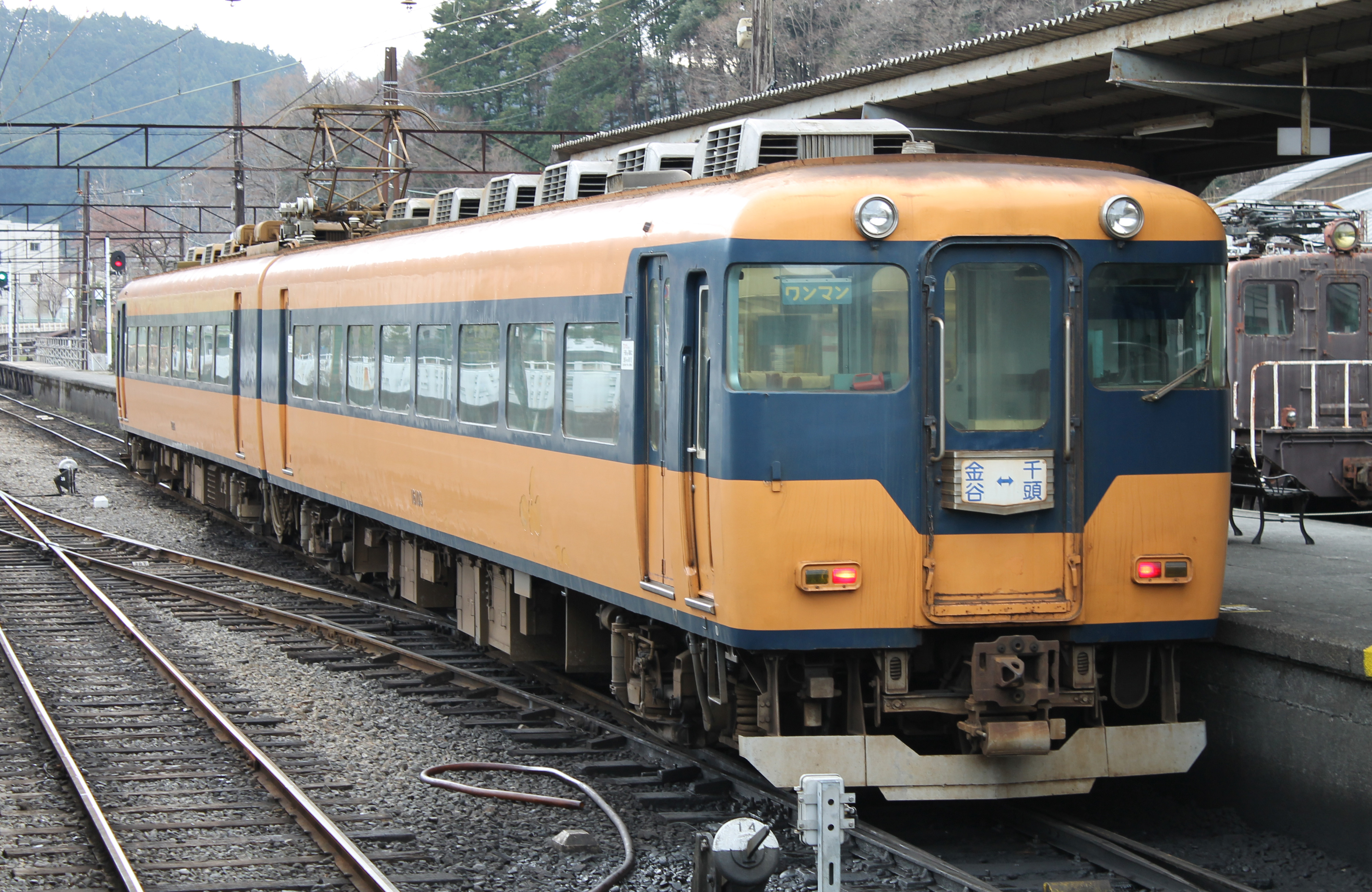
A 16000 series EMU in April 2012

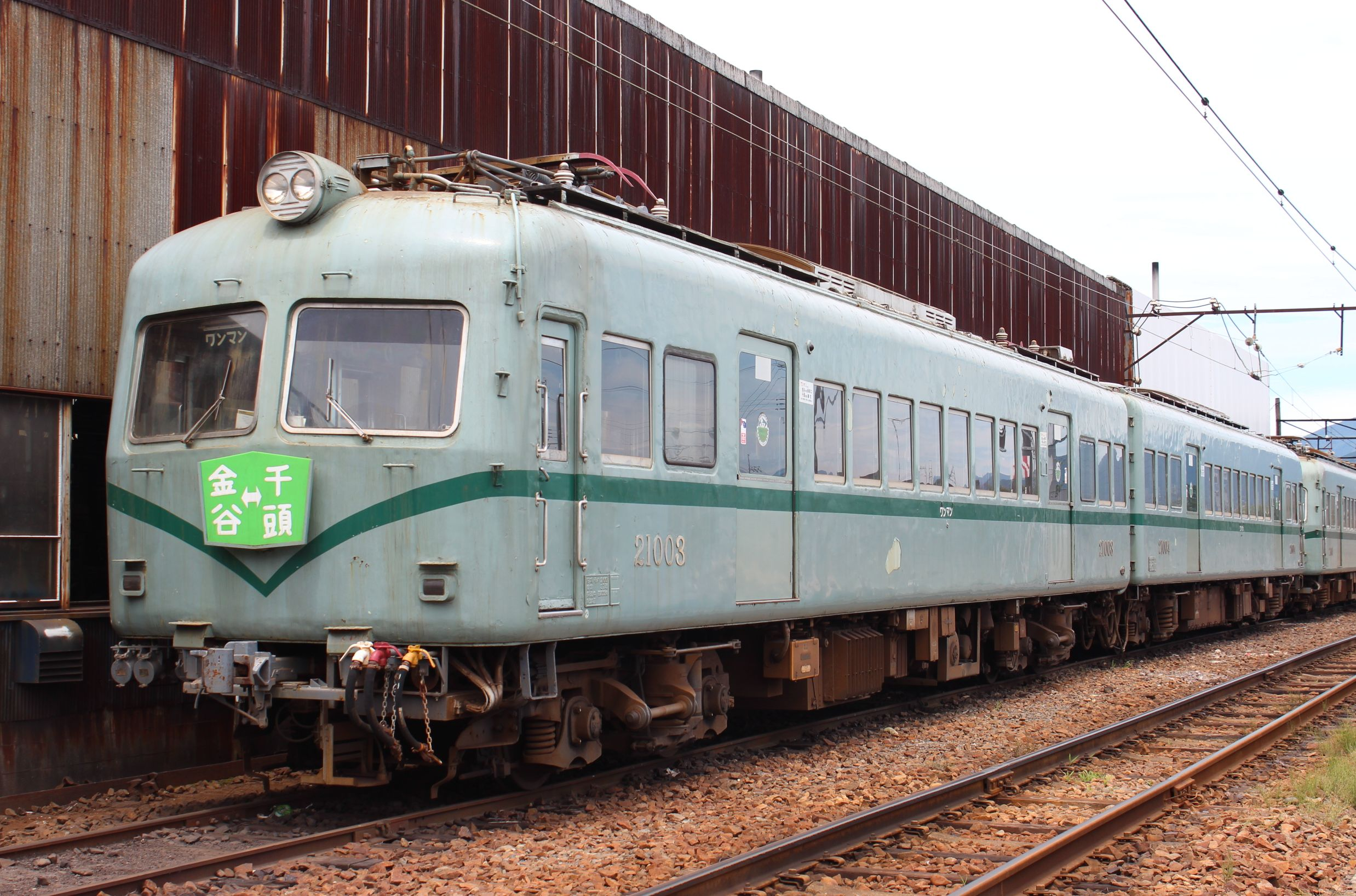
A 21000 series EMU in July 2013

=== Electric locomotives ===
- Class E10 x3
- Class ED500 x1

=== Steam locomotives ===
- JNR Class C10 (C10 8)
- JNR Class C11 (C11 190/227/312)
- JNR Class C12 (C12 164, stored out of service)
- JNR Class C56 (C56 44/135)
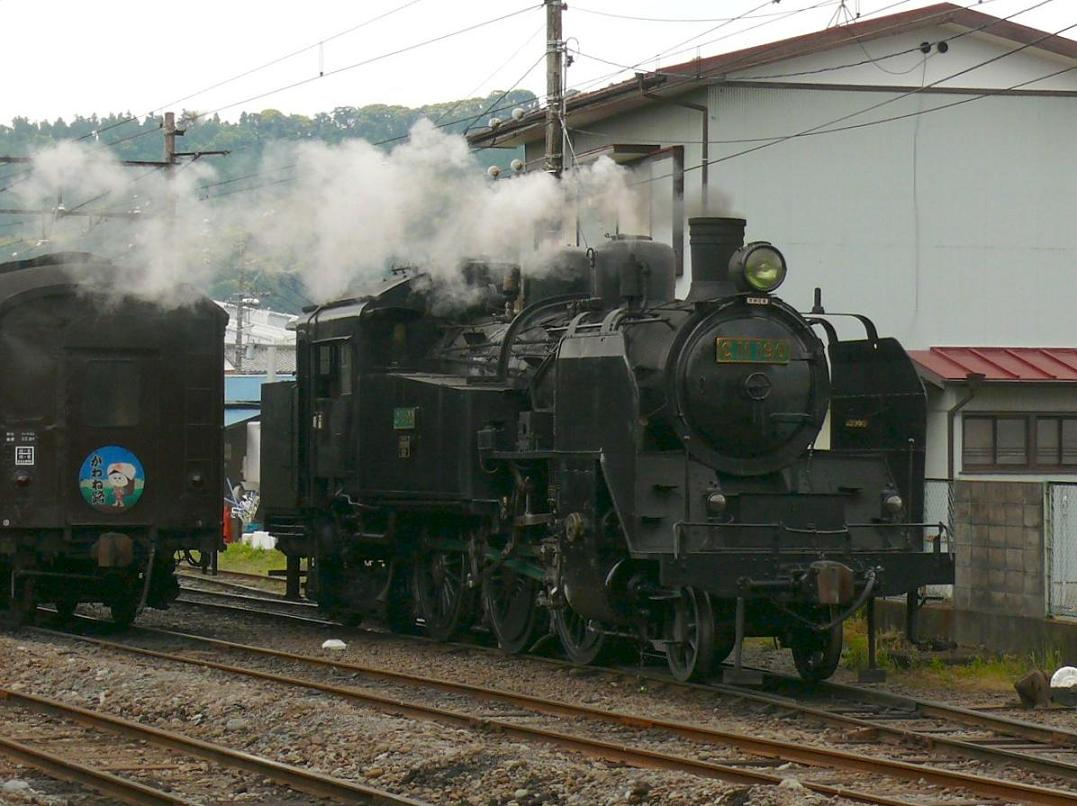
Steam locomotive C11 190

In 2016, The Oigawa Railway purchased four 14 series coaches from JR Hokkaido, which were formerly used on the Hamanasu services. These coaches are scheduled to enter service on steam-hauled services on the line in June 2017, reducing the burden on the ageing heritage coaches operated by the railway.

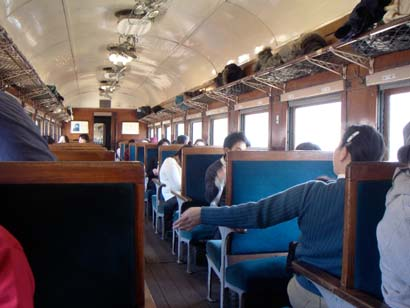
Interior of a heritage carriage

== See also ==
- List of railway lines in Japan
