= Hōrai Bridge =

Hōrai Bridge 蓬莱橋
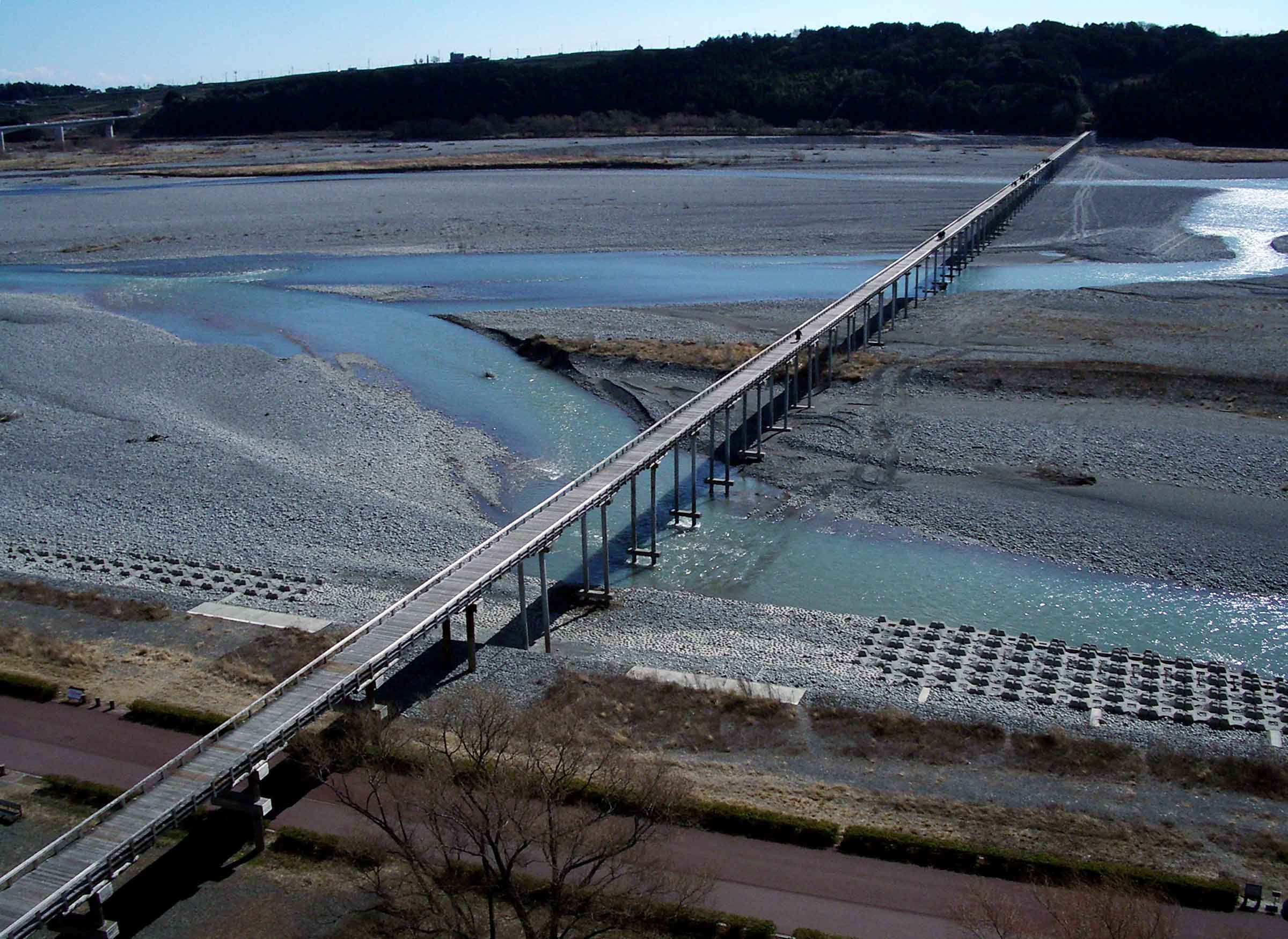
- Hōrai Bridge
- Coordinates: 34.821390°N 138.186213°E
- Crosses: Ōi River
- Locale: Shimada, Shizuoka, Japan

Characteristics
- Total length: 897.422 metres (2,944 ft)
- Width: 2.7 metres (9 ft)

History
- Construction end: 1879; 147 years ago

Statistics
- Toll: yes

Location
- Interactive map of Hōrai Bridge

The Hōrai Bridge (蓬莱橋, Hōrai-bashi) is a wooden pedestrian bridge over the Ōi River located in the city of Shimada, Shizuoka, Japan. It was constructed in 1879 and rebuilt after a flood in the 1960s. With a length of 897.422 metres (2,944.30 ft), the bridge was registered in The Guinness Book of Records as the longest wooden walking bridge in the world in 1997.

== History ==
The Hōrai Bridge is on the Edo period route of the Tōkaidō, connecting Edo with Kyoto. The Tokugawa shogunate expressly forbid the construction of any bridge or ferry service over the Ōi River for defensive purposes, forcing travelers to wade across its shallows. However, whenever the river flooded due to strong or long rains, crossing the river was impossible. During period of long rains, visitors were sometimes forced to stay at Shimada-juku or Kanaya-juku, sometimes for several days. Following the Meiji restoration, former samurai loyal to the Tokugawa clan settled in the Makinohara area and began to develop tea plantations. To facilitate crossing the river, this bridge was built in 1879. In 1965 its wooden pilings were replaced by concrete, but its wooden top was retained.
