= Kanaya Station =

Railway station in Shimada, Shizuoka Prefecture, Japan

CA25 Kanaya Station 金谷駅
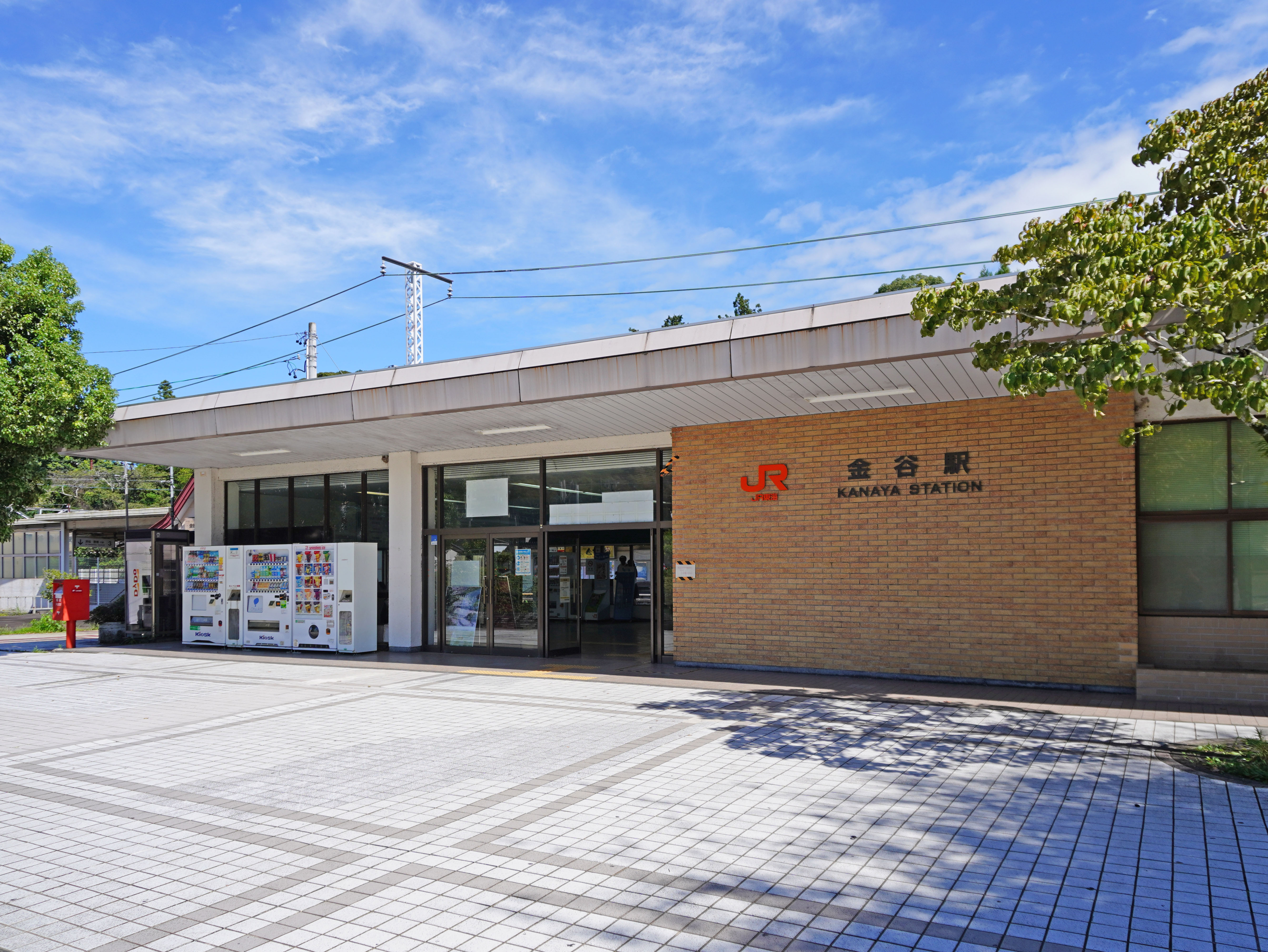
- JR Kanaya Station in September 2022

General information
- Location: Kanaya, Shimada-shi, Shizuoka-ken; Japan
- Coordinates: 34.819097°N 138.125460°E
- Operator: JR Central; Ōigawa Railway
- Lines: Tokaido Main Line; ■ Ōigawa Main Line
- Distance: 212.9 kilometers from Tokyo
- Platforms: 3 side platforms

Other information
- Status: Staffed
- Website: Official website

History
- Opened: May 16, 1890

Passengers
- FY2017: 2563 daily

Services
Preceding station	JR Central	Following station
Kikugawa CA26 towards Maibara	Tōkaidō Main Line Local	Shimada CA24 towards Atami
Preceding station	Ōigawa Railway	Following station
Terminus	Ōigawa Main Line SL Express	Shin-Kanaya towards Senzu
Terminus	Ōigawa Main Line Local	Shin-Kanaya towards Senzu
Location
- Location within Shizuoka Prefecture Location within Japan

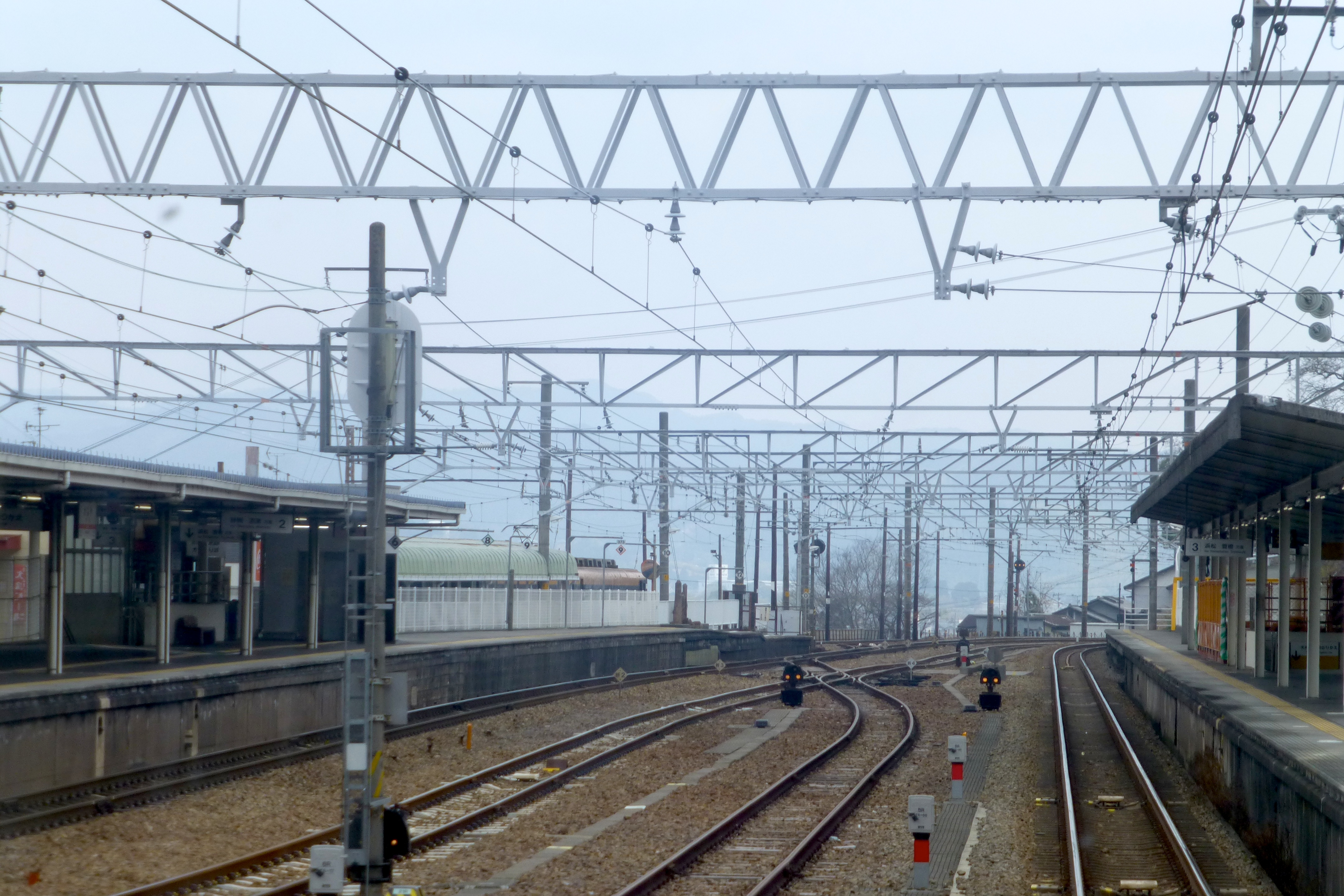
Tōkaidō Main Line station platforms in 2014

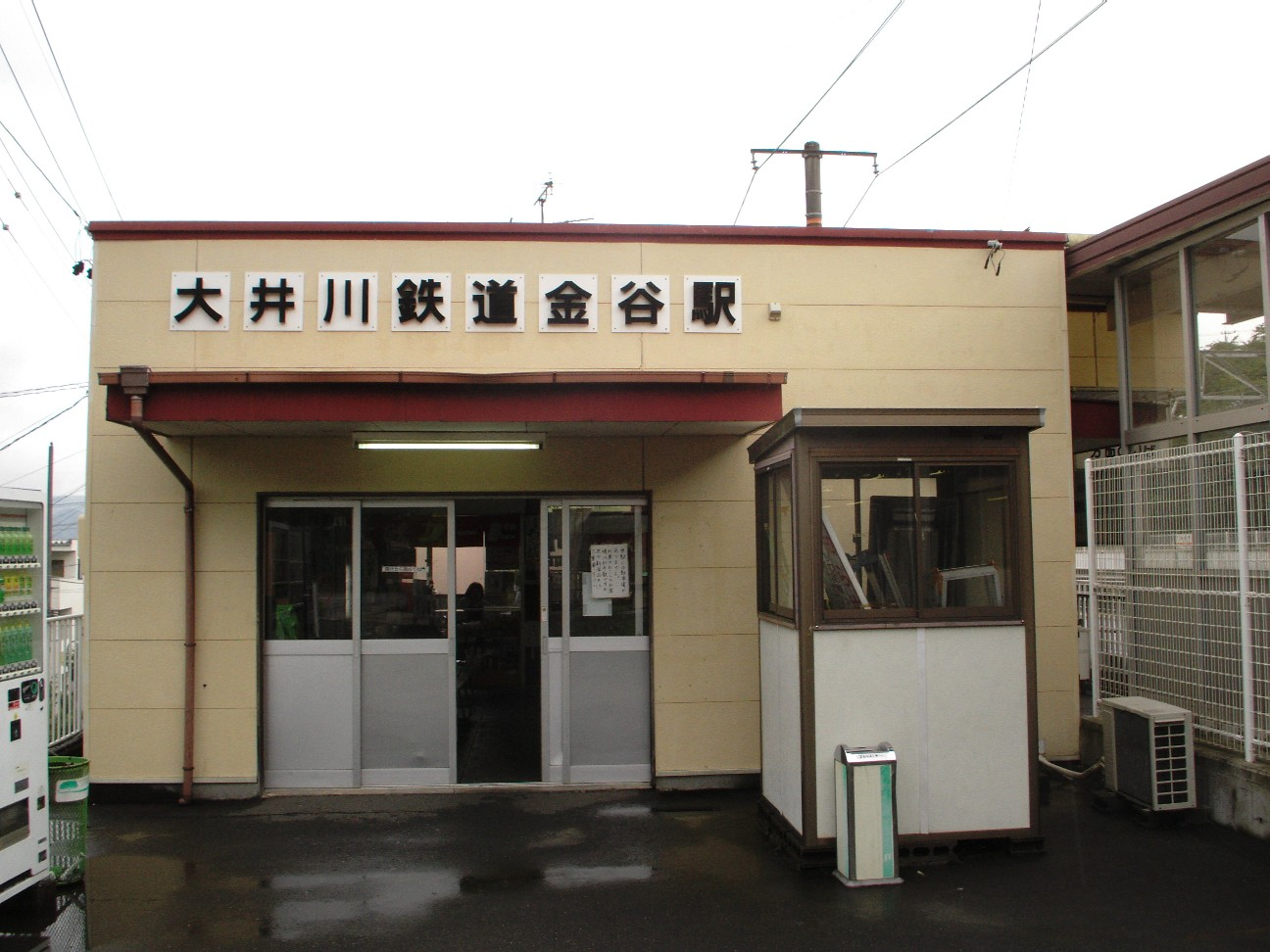
Ōigawa Kanaya Station

Kanaya Station (金谷駅, Kanaya-eki) is an interchange railway station in the city of Shimada, Shizuoka Prefecture, Japan, operated by Central Japan Railway Company (JR Central). The station is also used by the Ōigawa Railway.

== Lines ==
Kanaya Station is served by the Tōkaidō Main Line, and is located 212.9 kilometers from the starting point of the line at Tokyo Station. It is also a terminus of the Ōigawa Railway’s Ōigawa Main Line and is 39.5 kilometers form the opposing terminus at Senzu Station.

== Station layout ==
JR Kanaya Station has a two opposing side platforms serving Track 1 and Track 2 which are on headshunts, allowing for tracks for express trains to pass in between. The platforms are connected to the station building by an underpass. The station building has automated ticket machines, TOICA automated turnstiles and a staffed ticket office.

The adjacent Ōigawa Kanaya Station has a single side platform. The platform is equipped with Selective Door Operation, as trains longer than four cars in length are too long for the platform. The station originally was built with a terminal headshunt, which is no longer in existence.

=== Platforms ===
1	■ Tōkaidō Main Line	For Shizuoka and Numazu
2	■ Tōkaidō Main Line	For Hamamatsu and Toyohashi

1	■ Ōigawa Main Line	For Shin-Kanaya and Senzu

== Station history ==
Kanaya Station was opened on May 16, 1890, a year after when the section of the Tōkaidō Main Line connecting Shizuoka with Hamamatsu was completed. The Ōigawa Railway service began on June 10, 1927. Regularly scheduled freight service was discontinued in 1971.

Station numbering was introduced to the section of the Tōkaidō Line operated JR Central in March 2018; Kanaya Station was assigned station number CA25.

== Passenger statistics ==
In fiscal 2017, the JR portion station was used by an average of 2,019 passengers daily and the Ōigawa Railway portion by 277 passengers daily (boarding passengers only).

== Surrounding area ==
- Shizuoka Airport
- Suwahara Castle ruins

== See also ==
- List of railway stations in Japan
