= Omori Station (Shizuoka) =

Railway station in Kawanehon, Shizuoka Prefecture, Japan

Omori Station 尾盛駅
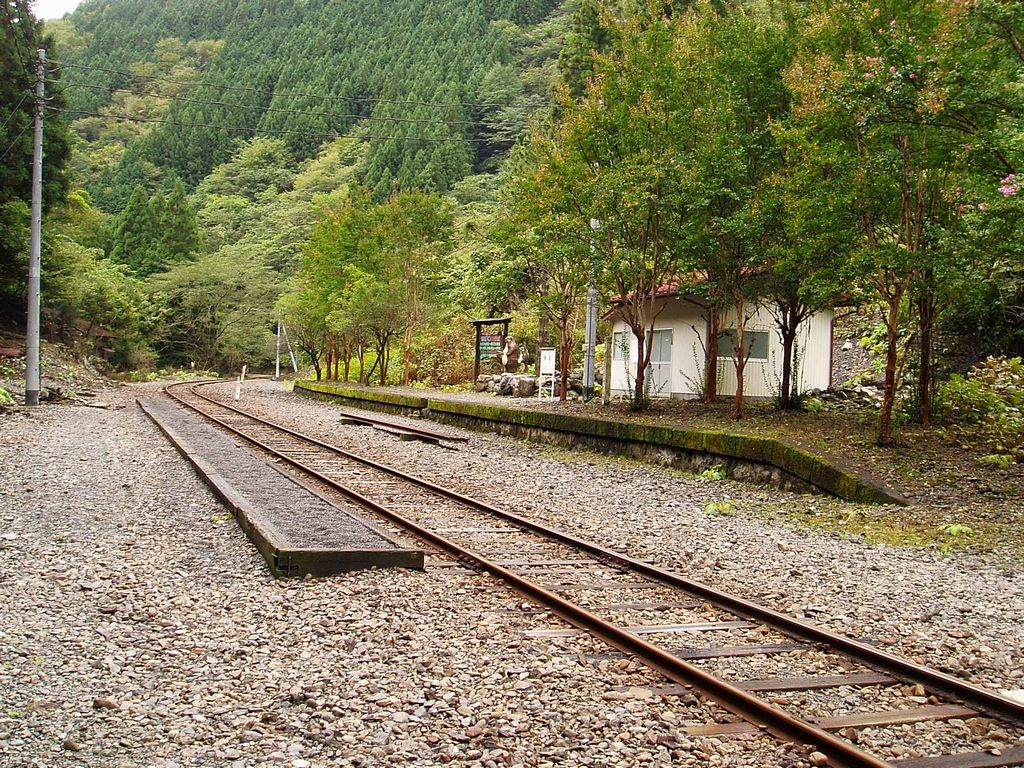
- Omori Station in July 2009

General information
- Location: Inuma, Kawanehon Town, Haibara District, Shizuoka Prefecture; Japan
- Coordinates: 35°11′31.91″N 138°10′27.63″E
- Elevation: 526 m (1,725 ft 9 in)
- Operator: Ōigawa Railway
- Line: Ikawa Line
- Distance: 17.8 km (11.1 mi) from Senzu
- Platforms: 1 side platforms
- Tracks: 1

Construction
- Structure type: At grade

Other information
- Status: Unstaffed

History
- Opened: 1 August 1959; 67 years ago

Passengers
- FY2017: 0.5 daily

Services
Preceding station	Ōigawa Railway	Following station
Sessokyō Onsen towards Senzu	Ikawa Line	Kanzō towards Ikawa
Location
- Location within Shizuoka Prefecture Location within Central Japan Location within Japan

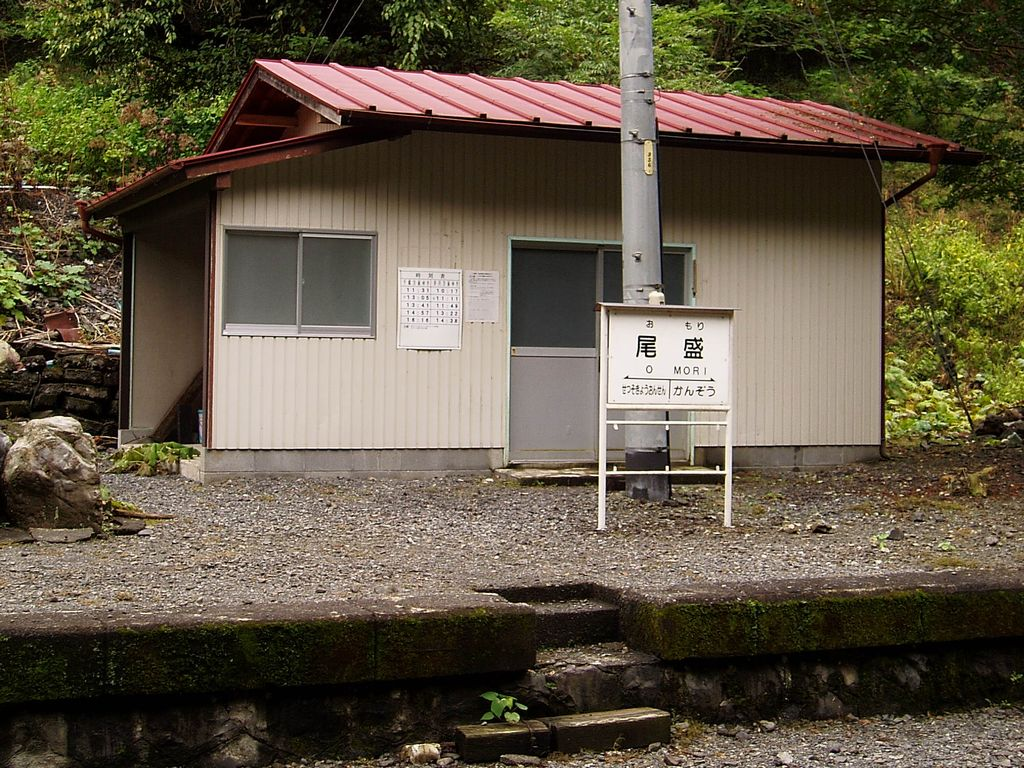
Omori Station

Omori Station (尾盛駅, Omori-eki) is a train station in the town of Kawanehon, Haibara District, Shizuoka Prefecture, Japan, operated by the Ōigawa Railway. It was built primarily to support dam construction activities in the area in the 1960s.

== Lines ==
Omori Station is served by the Ikawa Line, and is located 17.8 kilometers from the official starting point of the line at Senzu.

== Station layout ==
The station has two opposed side platforms serving two tracks, connected to a small station building by a level crossing. The station is unattended.

== Station history ==
Omori Station was opened on August 1, 1959.

== Passenger statistics ==
In fiscal 2017, the station was used by an average of 0.5 passengers daily (boarding passengers only).

== Surrounding area ==
Located in an isolated mountain area surrounded by forests, it has very few passengers. It is known as a hikyō station among rail enthusiasts.

- Oi River

== See also ==
- List of railway stations in Japan
