= Okuōikojō Station =

Railway station in Kawanehon, Shizuoka Prefecture, Japan

Okuōikojō Station 奥大井湖上駅
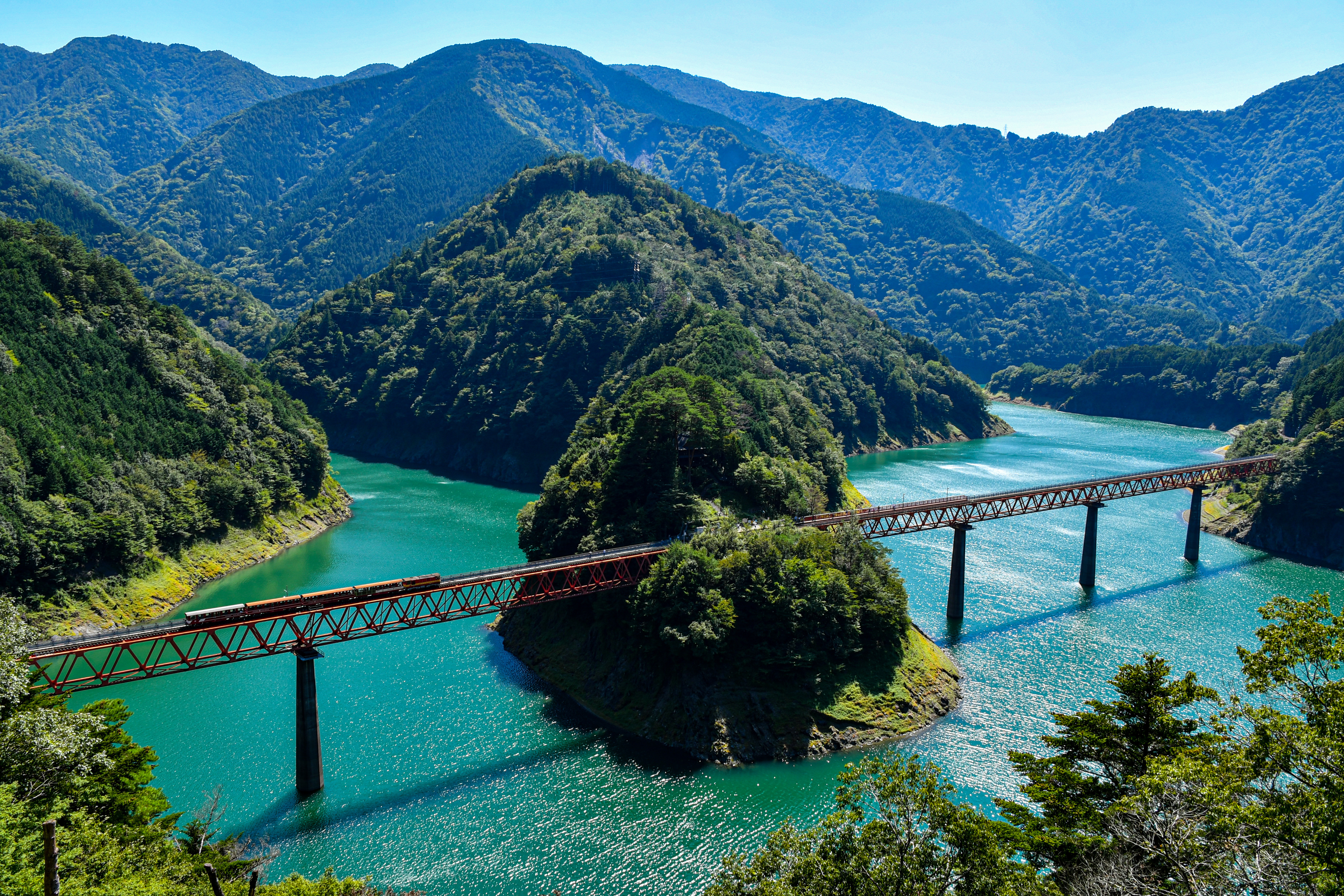
- Okuōikojō Station and the surrounding area in September 2021

General information
- Other names: 奥大井恋錠駅
- Location: Baichi, Kawanehon Town, Haibara District, Shizuoka Prefecture; Japan
- Coordinates: 35°10′04.51″N 138°10′51.4″E
- Elevation: 490 m (1,607 ft 7 in)
- Operator: Ōigawa Railway
- Line: Ikawa Line
- Distance: 13.9 km (8.6 mi) from Senzu
- Platforms: 1 side platform
- Tracks: 1

Construction
- Structure type: At grade

Other information
- Status: Unstaffed

History
- Opened: October 2, 1990; 36 years ago
- Former names: Inuma

Passengers
- FY2019: 79 daily

Services
Preceding station	Ōigawa Railway	Following station
Hiranda towards Senzu	Ikawa Line	Sessokyō Onsen towards Ikawa
Location
- Location within Shizuoka Prefecture Location within Central Japan Location within Japan

Okuōikojō Station (奥大井湖上駅, Okuōikojō-eki) is a train station in Kawanehon, Haibara District, Shizuoka Prefecture, Japan, operated by the Ōigawa Railway. Okuōikojō Station is served by the Ikawa Line and is located 13.9 kilometers from the line's official starting point at Senzu.

== Description ==
=== Background ===
Okuōikojō Station opened on the current position on October 2, 1990, when part of the Ikawa Line was rerouted to avoid the lake's rising waters caused by the Nagashima Dam. Technically, the Oigawa Railway treats the station as the renamed and relocated Inuma station, which was submerged by the mentioned dam. Taking this into account, the actual opening year for the station is 1959. Despite the area around the relocated station lacking any residents living nearby, Oigawa Railway proceeded with the construction of the station to attract tourists.

=== Layout and surroundings ===
The station has one side platform serving a single track, with a small shelter on the platform for passengers. The station is unattended. Located on a cliff next to the Okuōi Reservoir created by the Nagashima Dam, the station platform partially extends onto a bridge spanning the reservoir. The bridges on both sides of the station is named the "Okuōi Rainbow Bridge". The bridges were built three years earlier than the Rainbow Bridge in Tokyo. The submerged Inuma station and the former Ikawa Line route can still be seen when the water level of the lake is lower.

== Passenger statistics ==
In fiscal 2017, the station was used by an average of 16 passengers daily (boarding passengers only).

== See also ==
- List of railway stations in Japan
