= Abt Ichishiro Station =

Railway station in Kawanehon, Shizuoka Prefecture, Japan

Abt Ichishiro Station アプトいちしろ駅
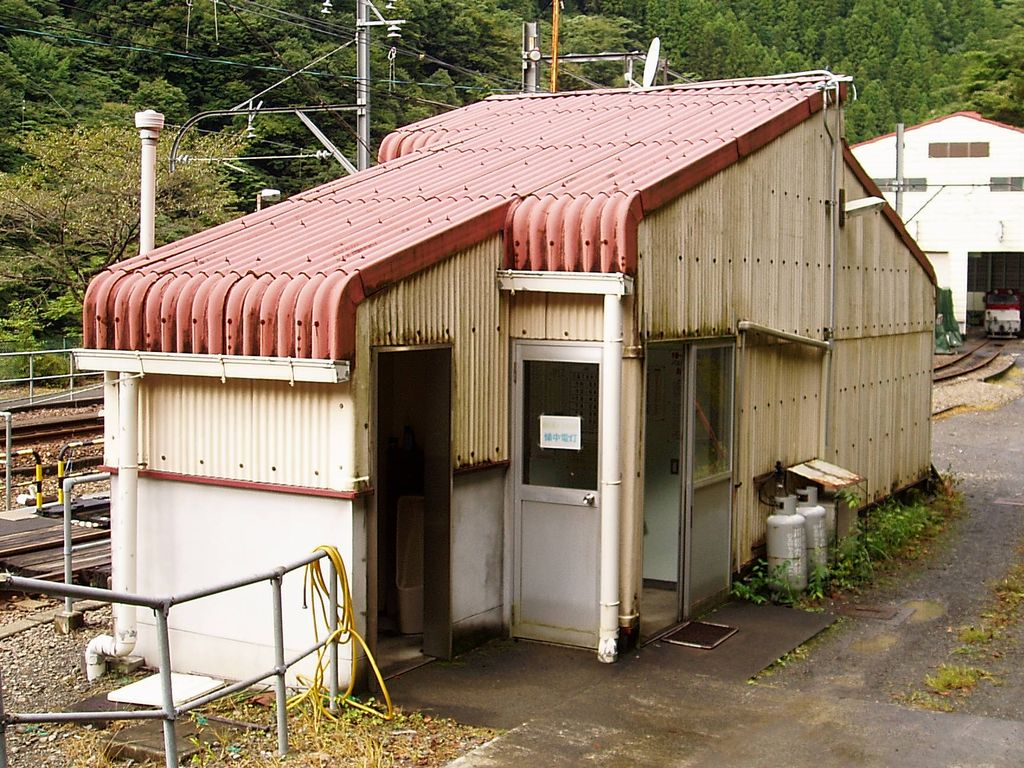
- Abt Ichishiro Station in July 2009

General information
- Location: Baichi, Kawanehon-cho, Haibara-gun, Shizuoka-ken; Japan
- Coordinates: 35°10′3.67″N 138°8′40.87″E
- Elevation: 307 m (1,007 ft)
- Operator: Ōigawa Railway
- Line: ■ Ikawa Line
- Distance: 9.9 kilometers from Senzu
- Platforms: 2 side platforms

Other information
- Status: Unstaffed

History
- Opened: August 1, 1959; 67 years ago
- Former names: Kawane-Ichishiro (until 1990)

Passengers
- FY2017: 3 daily
Location
- Location within Shizuoka Prefecture Location within Japan

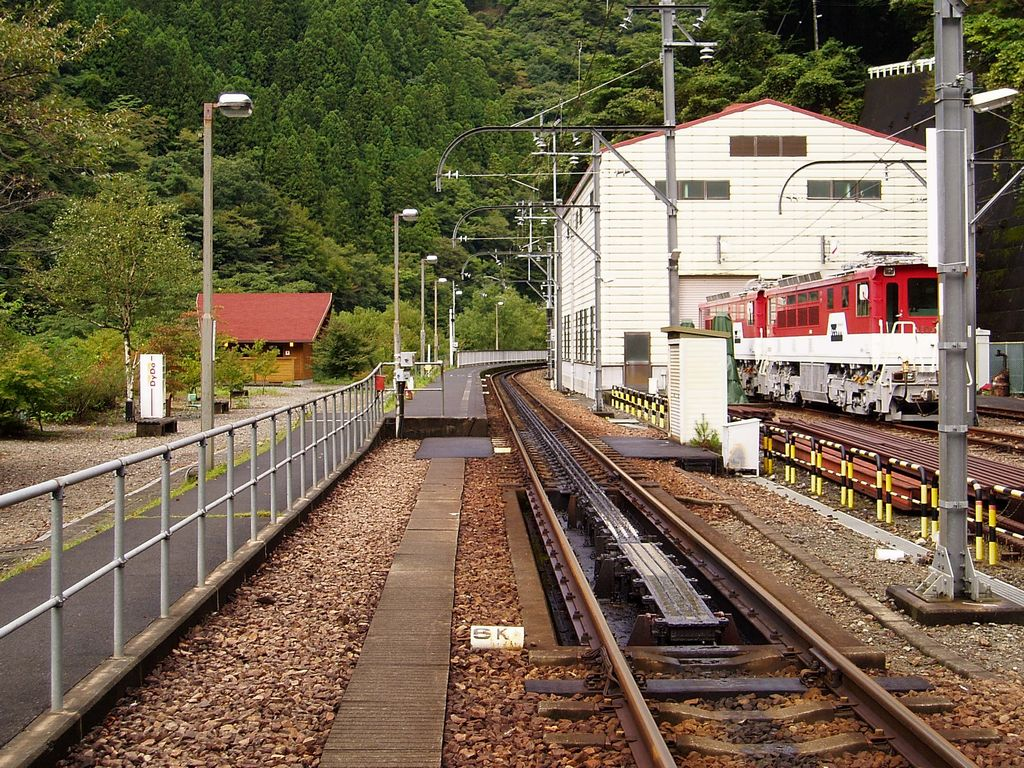
ABT-Ichishiro Station

Abt Ichishiro Station (アプトいちしろ駅, Aputoichishiro-eki) is a train station in the town of Kawanehon, Haibara District, Shizuoka Prefecture, Japan, operated by the Ōigawa Railway. From Abt Ichishiro Station to Nagashima Dam Station the gradient is very steep and an Abt rack system is used.

== Lines ==
Abt Ichishiro Station is served by the Ikawa Line, and is located 9.9 kilometers from the official starting point of the line at Senzu.

== Station layout ==
The station has two opposed side platforms serving two tracks, connected to a small red-roofed station building by a level crossing. The station is unattended.

== Adjacent stations ==
«	Service	»
Ōigawa Railway
Ikawa Line
Okuizumi	-	Nagashima Dam
Ikawa Line (~1990)
Okuizumi	-	Ōkashima

== Station history ==
Abt Ichishiro Station was opened on August 1, 1959, and was originally named Kawane-Ichishiro Station (川根市代駅). The original line past this station and the stations on that line are now submerged under the waters of the reservoir created by the completion of the Nagashima Dam. When Nagashima Dam Station was built in 1990, the present Abt system was installed.

== Passenger statistics ==
In fiscal 2017, the station was used by an average of 2 passengers daily (boarding passengers only).

== Surrounding area ==
- Ōi River
- Ōigawa Dam

== See also ==
- List of railway stations in Japan
