= Sessokyō Onsen Station =

Railway station in Kawanehon, Shizuoka Prefecture, Japan

Sessokyō Onsen Station 接岨峡温泉駅
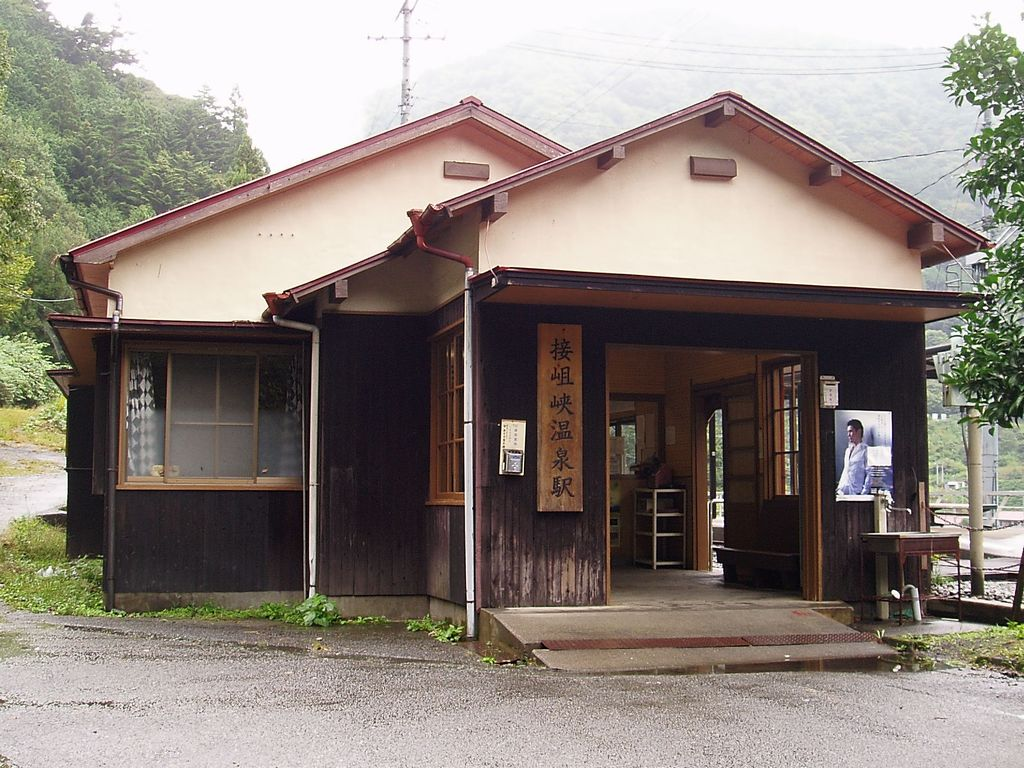
- Sessokyō Onsen Station in July 2009

General information
- Location: Inuma, Kawanehon Town, Haibara District, Shizuoka Prefecture; Japan
- Coordinates: 35°10′43.14″N 138°11′6.68″E
- Elevation: 496 m (1,627 ft 4 in)
- Operator: Ōigawa Railway
- Line: Ikawa Line
- Distance: 15.5 km (9.6 mi) from Senzu
- Platforms: 1 island platform

Construction
- Structure type: At grade

Other information
- Status: Unstaffed

History
- Opened: 1 August 1959; 67 years ago
- Former names: Kawane-Nakashima (to 1990)

Passengers
- FY2019: 60 daily

Services
Preceding station	Ōigawa Railway	Following station
Okuōikojō towards Senzu	Ikawa Line	Omori towards Ikawa
Location
- Location within Shizuoka Prefecture Location within Central Japan Location within Japan

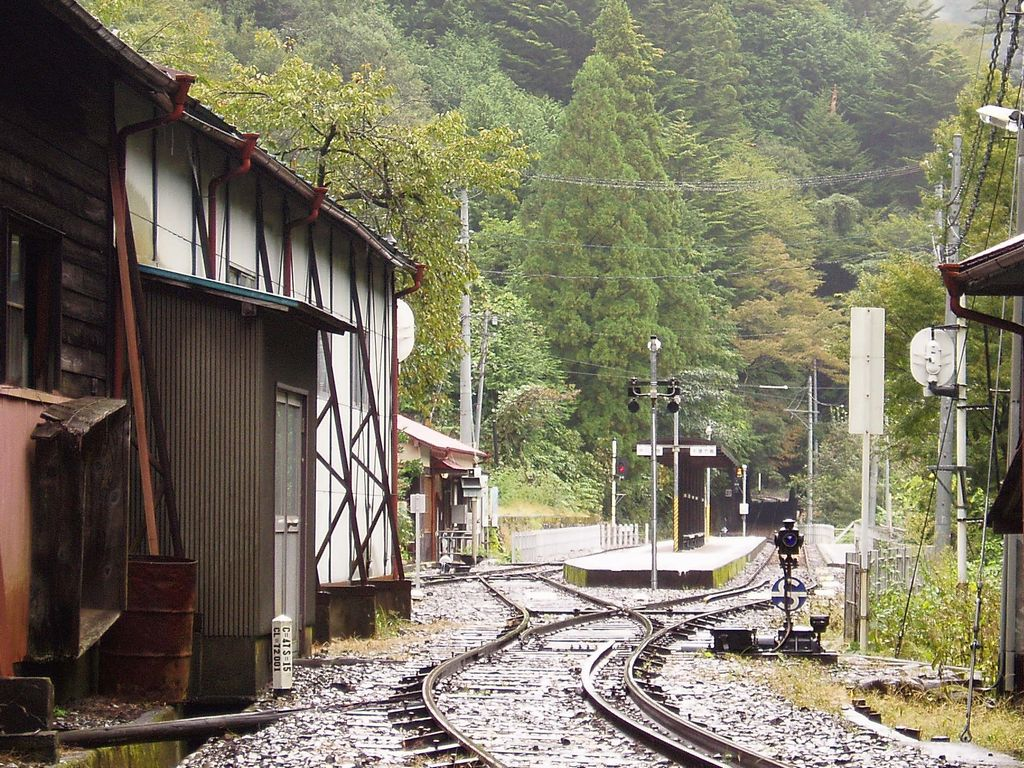
Sessokyō Onsen Station

Sessokyō Onsen Station (接岨峡温泉駅, Sessokyō Onsen-eki) is a train station in the town of Kawanehon, Haibara District, Shizuoka Prefecture, Japan, operated by the Ōigawa Railway.

== Lines ==
Sessokyō Onsen Station is served by the Ikawa Line, and is located 15.5 kilometers from the official starting point of the line at Senzu.

== Station layout ==
The station has an island platform serving two tracks, connected to a station building by a level crossing. The station is unattended.

== Station history ==
Sessokyō Onsen Station was opened on August 1, 1959 as Kawane-Nakashima Station (川根長島駅). It was built primarily to support dam construction activities at the nearby Nagashima Dam. On completion of the dam in October 1990, it was renamed to its present name as part of an effort to draw customers to the nearby Sessokyō Onsen hot springs resort.

== Passenger statistics ==
In fiscal 2017, the station was used by an average of 15 passengers daily (boarding passengers only).

== Surrounding area ==
- Oi River
- Sessokyō onsen

== See also ==
- List of railway stations in Japan
