= Okuizumi Station =

Railway station in Kawanehon, Shizuoka Prefecture, Japan

Okuizumi Station 奥泉駅
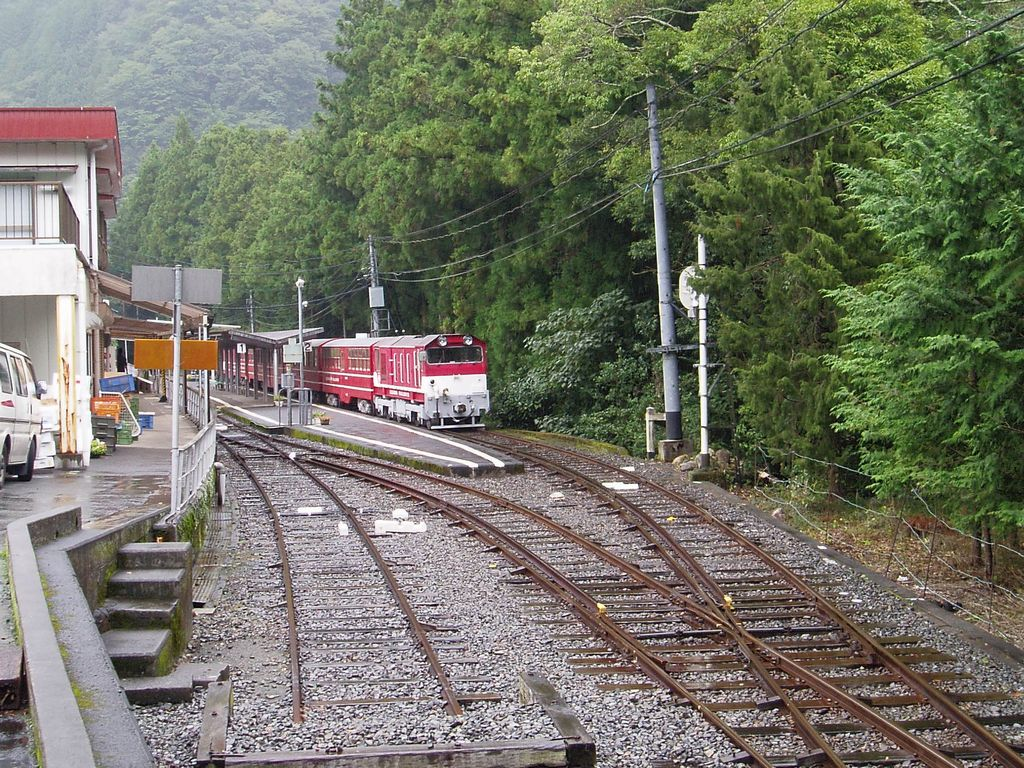
- Okuizumi Station in July 2009

General information
- Location: Okuizumi, Kawanehon-cho, Haibara-gun, Shizuoka-ken; Japan
- Coordinates: 35°08′59″N 138°08′52″E
- Elevation: 369 m (1,211 ft)
- Operator: Ōigawa Railway
- Line: ■ Ikawa Line
- Distance: 7.5 kilometers from Senzu
- Platforms: 2 side platforms

Other information
- Status: Staffed

History
- Opened: August 1, 1959

Passengers
- FY2017: 36 daily
Location
- Location within Shizuoka Prefecture Location within Japan

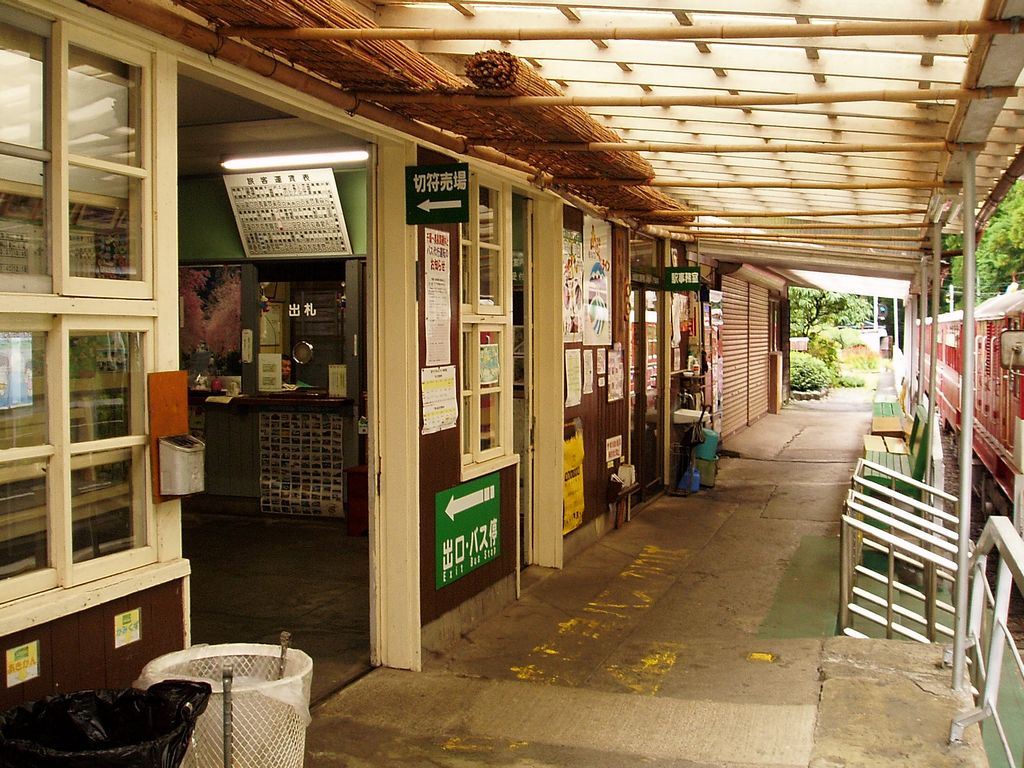
Inside Okuizumi Station

Okuizumi Station (奥泉駅, Okuizumi-eki) is a train station in the town of Kawanehon, Haibara District, Shizuoka Prefecture, Japan, operated by the Ōigawa Railway.

== Lines ==
Okuizumi Station is served by the Ikawa Line, and is located 7.5 kilometers from the official starting point of the line at Senzu.

== Station layout ==
The station has an island platforms serving two tracks connected to a small station building by a level crossing. The station is staffed.

== Adjacent stations ==
«	Service	»
Ōigawa Railway
Ikawa Line
Kawane-Koyama	-	Abt Ichishiro

== Station history ==
Okuizumi Station was opened on August 1, 1959.

== Passenger statistics ==
In fiscal 2017, the station was used by an average of 36 passengers daily (boarding passengers only).

== Surrounding area ==
- Oi River

== See also ==
- List of railway stations in Japan
