= Domoto Station =

Railway station in Kawanehon, Shizuoka Prefecture, Japan

Domoto Station 土本駅
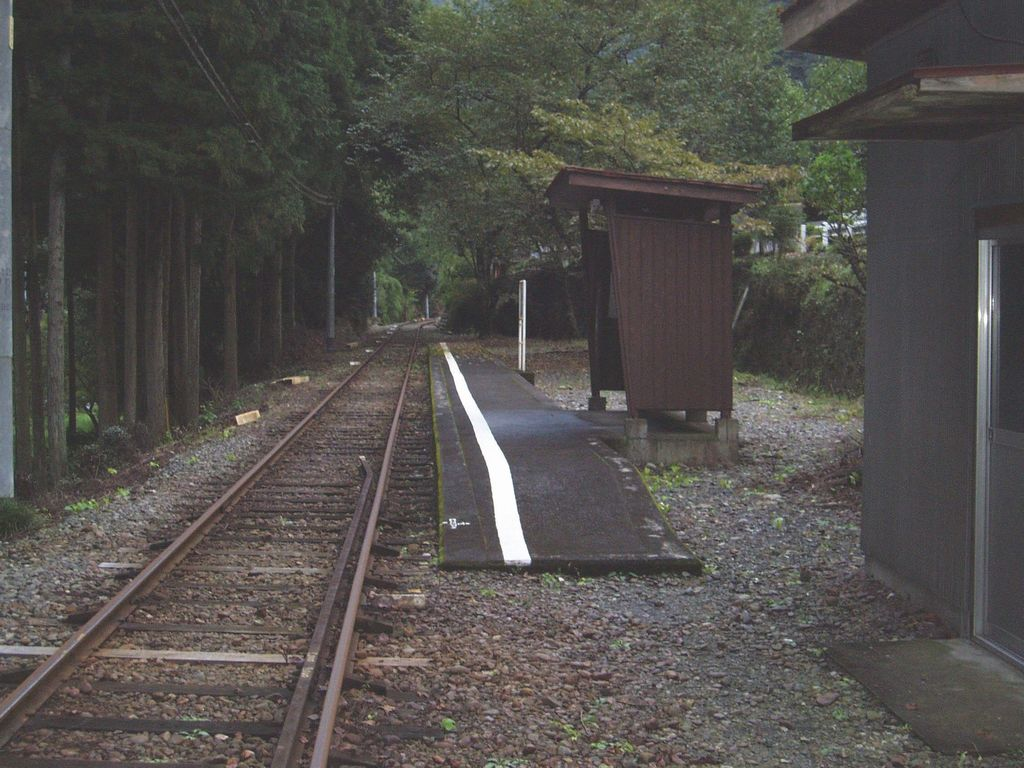
- Domoto Station in July 2009

General information
- Location: Okuizumi, Kawanehon-cho, Haibara-gun, Shizuoka-ken; Japan
- Coordinates: 35°08′09.75″N 138°08′21.10″E
- Elevation: 325 m (1,066 ft)
- Operator: Ōigawa Railway
- Line: ■ Ikawa Line
- Distance: 3.9 kilometers from Senzu
- Platforms: 1 side platform

Other information
- Status: Unstaffed

History
- Opened: August 1, 1959

Passengers
- FY2017: 0.4 daily
Location
- Location within Shizuoka Prefecture Location within Japan

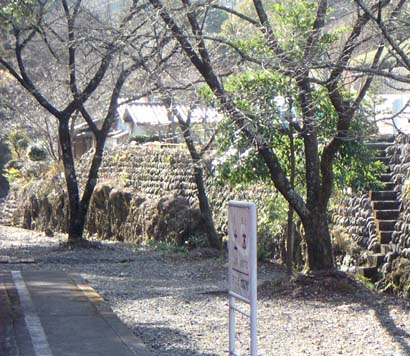
Domoto Station

Domoto Station (土本駅, Domoto-eki) is a train station in the town of Kawanehon, Haibara District, Shizuoka Prefecture, Japan, operated by the Ōigawa Railway.

== Lines ==
Domoto Station is served by the Ikawa Line, and is located 3.9 kilometers from the official starting point of the line at Senzu.

== Station layout ==
The station has one side platform serving a single track, and a small rain shelter for passengers. There are no station buildings and the station is unattended.

== Adjacent stations ==
«	Service	»
Ōigawa Railway
Ikawa Line
Sawama	-	Kawane-Koyama

== Station history ==
Domoto Station was opened on August 1, 1959.

== Passenger statistics ==
In fiscal 2017, the station was used by an average of 0.4 passengers daily (boarding passengers only).

== Surrounding area ==
Located in an isolated mountain area surrounded by dense forest, the station receives few passengers.

- Oi River

== See also ==
- List of railway stations in Japan
