= Kawane-Koyama Station =

Railway station in Kawanehon, Shizuoka Prefecture, Japan

Kawane-Koyama Station 川根小山駅
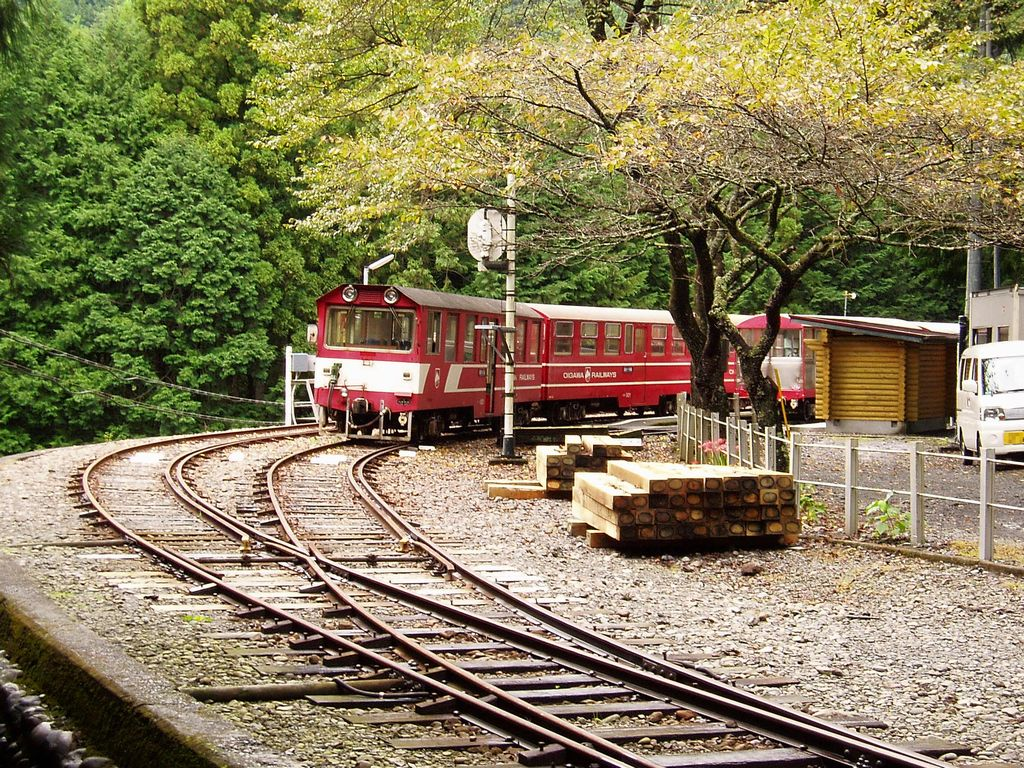
- Kawane-Koyama Station in July 2009

General information
- Location: Okuizumi, Kawanehon-cho, Haibara-gun, Shizuoka-ken; Japan
- Coordinates: 35°08′30.41″N 138°08′27.90″E
- Elevation: 354 m (1,161 ft)
- Operator: Ōigawa Railway
- Line: ■ Ikawa Line
- Distance: 5.8 kilometers from Senzu
- Platforms: 2 side platforms

Other information
- Status: Unstaffed

History
- Opened: August 1, 1959

Passengers
- FY2017: 0.5 daily
Location
- Location within Shizuoka Prefecture Location within Japan

Kawane-Koyama Station (川根小山駅, Kawane-Koyama-eki) is a train station in the town of Kawanehon, Haibara District, Shizuoka Prefecture, Japan, operated by the Ōigawa Railway.

== Lines ==
Kawane-Koyama Station is served by the Ikawa Line, and is located 5.8 kilometers from the official starting point of the line at Senzu.

== Station layout ==
The station has two opposed side platforms serving two tracks, connected by a level crossing and a small log-cabin type rain shelter for passengers. The station is unattended.

== Adjacent stations ==
«	Service	»
Ōigawa Railway
Ikawa Line
Domoto	-	Okuizumi

== Station history ==
Kawane-Koyama Station was opened on August 1, 1959.

== Passenger statistics ==
In fiscal 2017, the station was used by an average of 0.5 passengers daily (boarding passengers only).

== Surrounding area ==
- Oi River

== See also ==
- List of railway stations in Japan
