= Hiranda Station =

Railway station in Kawanehon, Shizuoka Prefecture, Japan

Hiranda Station ひらんだ駅
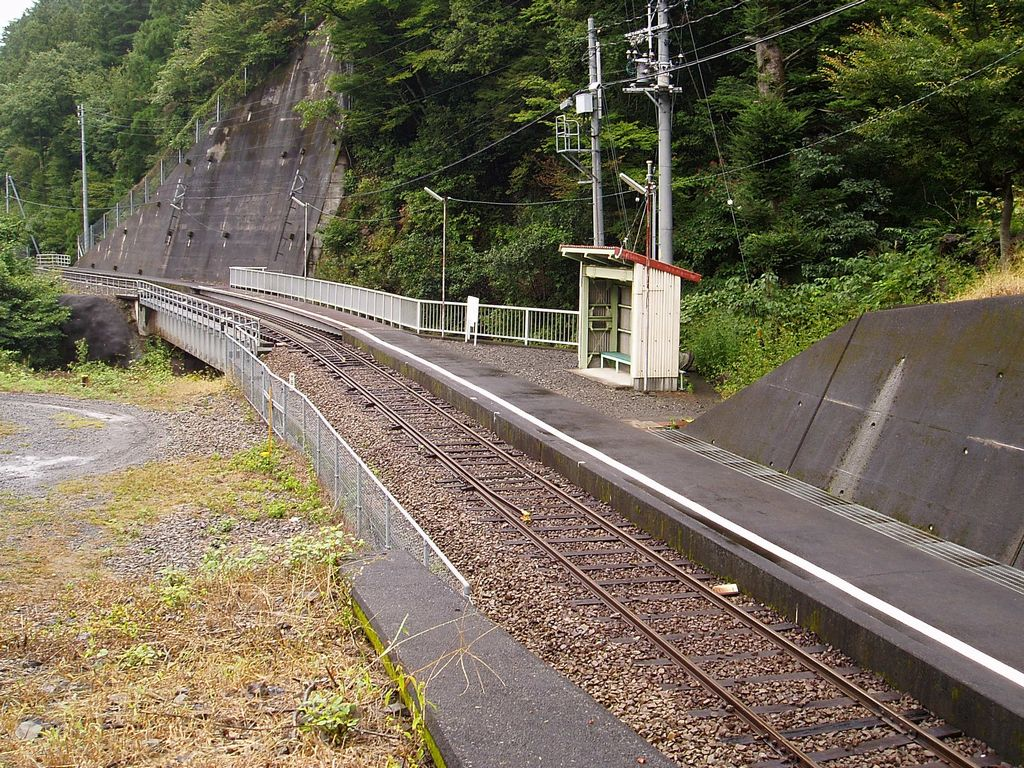
- Hiranda Station

General information
- Location: Inuma, Kawanehon, Haibara, Shizuoka （静岡県榛原郡川根本町犬間） Japan
- Coordinates: 35°9′53.34″N 138°10′4.54″E
- Elevation: 485 m (1,591 ft)
- Operator: Ōigawa Railway
- Line: ■ Ikawa Line
- Distance: 12.6 kilometers from Senzu
- Platforms: 1 side platform

Other information
- Status: Unstaffed

History
- Opened: October 2, 1990

Passengers
- FY2017: 0.3 daily
Location
- Location within Shizuoka Prefecture Location within Japan

Hiranda Station (ひらんだ駅, Hiranda-eki) is a train station in the town of Kawanehon, Haibara District, Shizuoka Prefecture, Japan, operated by the Ōigawa Railway.

== Lines ==
Hiranda Station is served by the Ikawa Line, and is located 12.6 kilometers from the official starting point of the line at Senzu.

== Station layout ==
The station has one side platform serving a single track, and a small shelter for passengers. There is no station building, and the station is unattended.

== Adjacent stations ==
«	Service	»
Ōigawa Railway
Ikawa Line
Nagashima Dam	-	Okuōikojō

== Station history ==
Hiranda Station was opened on October 2, 1990, when part of the Ikawa Line was re-routed to avoid the rising waters of the lake created by the Nagashima Dam.

== Passenger statistics ==
In fiscal 2017, the station was used by an average of 0.3 passengers daily (boarding passengers only).

== Surrounding area ==
Located in an isolated mountain area surrounded by forests, it has very few passengers.

== In media ==
The 3rd episode of the TV series "Tetsu Ota Michiko, 20,000 km" is dedicated to this station

== See also ==
- List of railway stations in Japan
