= Kanzō Station =

Railway station in Shizuoka, Japan

Kanzō Station 閑蔵駅
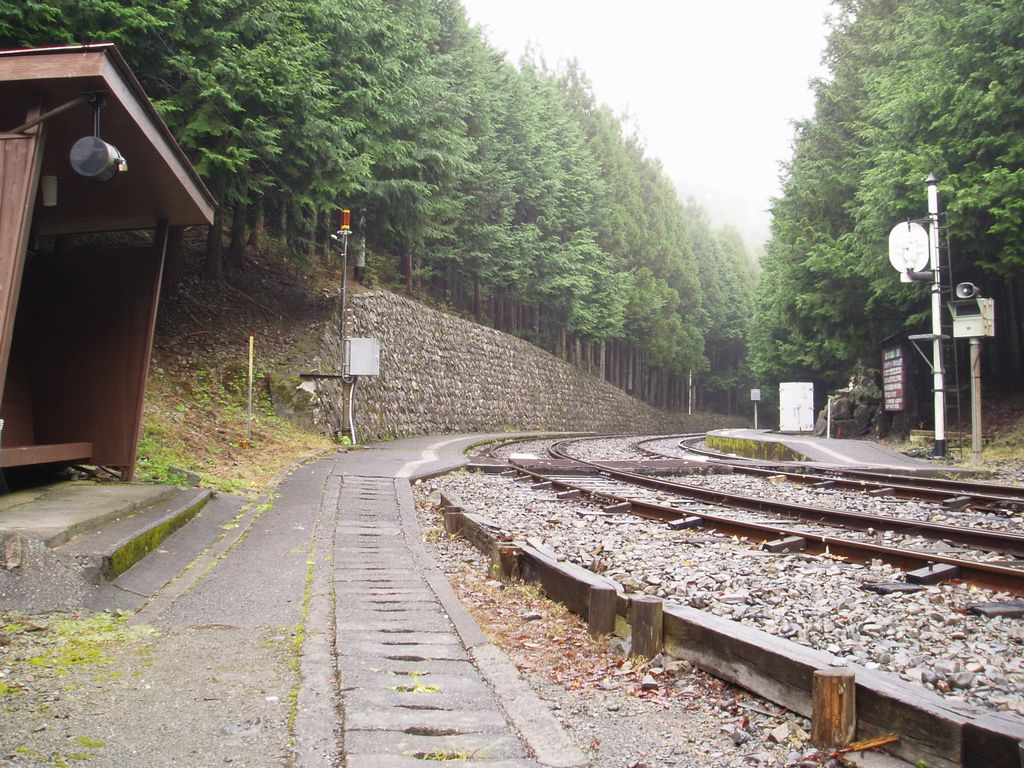
- Kanzō Station in October 2007

General information
- Location: Ikawa, Aoi-ku, Shizuoka-shi, Shizuoka-ken; Japan
- Coordinates: 35°11′29.9″N 138°11′40.5″E
- Elevation: 557 m (1,827 ft)
- Operator: Ōigawa Railway
- Line: ■ Ikawa Line
- Distance: 20.5 kilometers from Senzu
- Platforms: 2 side platforms

Other information
- Status: Unstaffed

History
- Opened: August 1, 1959

Passengers
- FY2017: 4 daily
Location
- Location within Shizuoka Prefecture Location within Japan

Kanzō Station (閑蔵駅, Kanzō-eki) is a railway station in Aoi-ku, Shizuoka, Japan, operated by the Ōigawa Railway.

== Lines ==
Kanzō Station is served by the Ikawa Line, and is located 20.5 kilometers from the official starting point of the line at Senzu.

== Station layout ==
The station has two opposed side platforms connected by a level crossing and a small unstaffed lean-to rain shelter on the platform for passengers. The station is unattended.

== Adjacent stations ==
«	Service	»
Ōigawa Railway
Ikawa Line
Omori	-	Ikawa

== Station history ==
Kanzō Station was opened on August 1, 1959. Located in an isolated mountain area surrounded by forests, it has very few passengers. It was built primarily to support dam construction activities in the Ōi River area in the 1960s.

== Passenger statistics ==
In fiscal 2017, the station was used by an average of 4 passengers daily (boarding passengers only).

== Surrounding area ==
- Ōi River

== See also ==
- List of railway stations in Japan
