= Kawane-Ryōgoku Station =

Railway station in Kawanehon, Shizuoka Prefecture, Japan

Kawane-Ryōgoku Station 川根両国駅
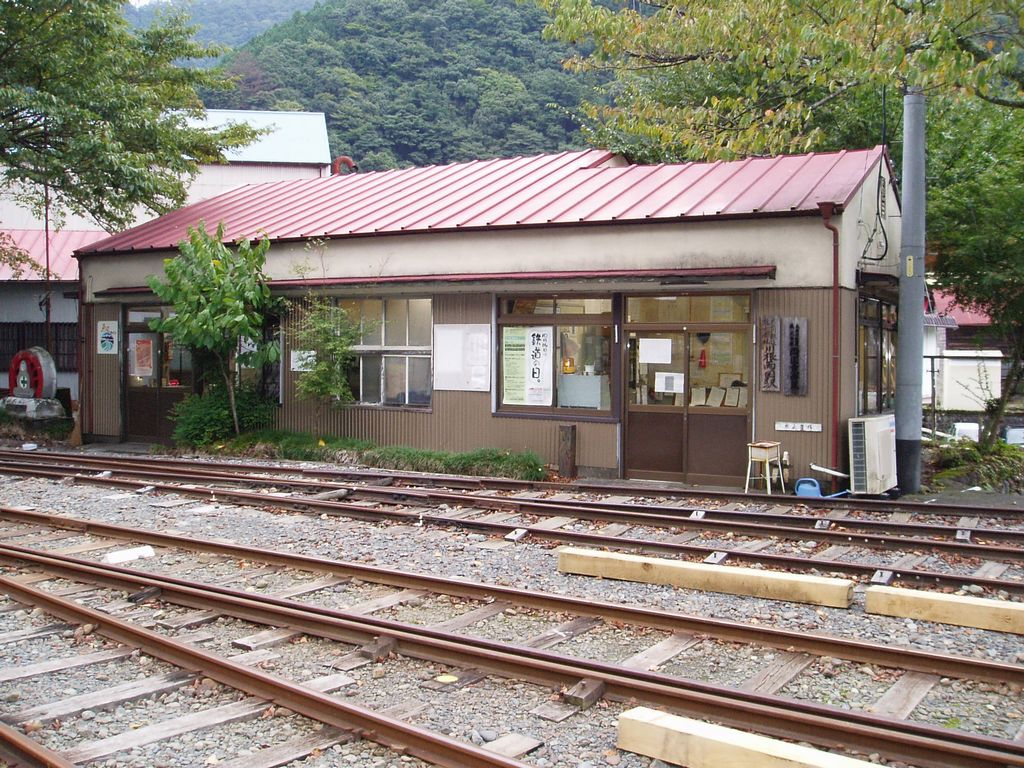
- Kawane-Ryōgoku Station

General information
- Location: Senzu, Kawanehon-cho, Haibara-gun, Shizuoka-ken; Japan
- Coordinates: 35°7′0.70″N 138°8′26.06″E
- Elevation: 307 m (1,007 ft)
- Operator: Ōigawa Railway
- Line: ■ Ikawa Line
- Distance: 1.1 kilometers from Senzu
- Platforms: 1 side +1 island platforms

Other information
- Status: Staffed

History
- Opened: August 1, 1959

Passengers
- FY2017: 3 daily
Location
- Location within Shizuoka Prefecture Location within Japan

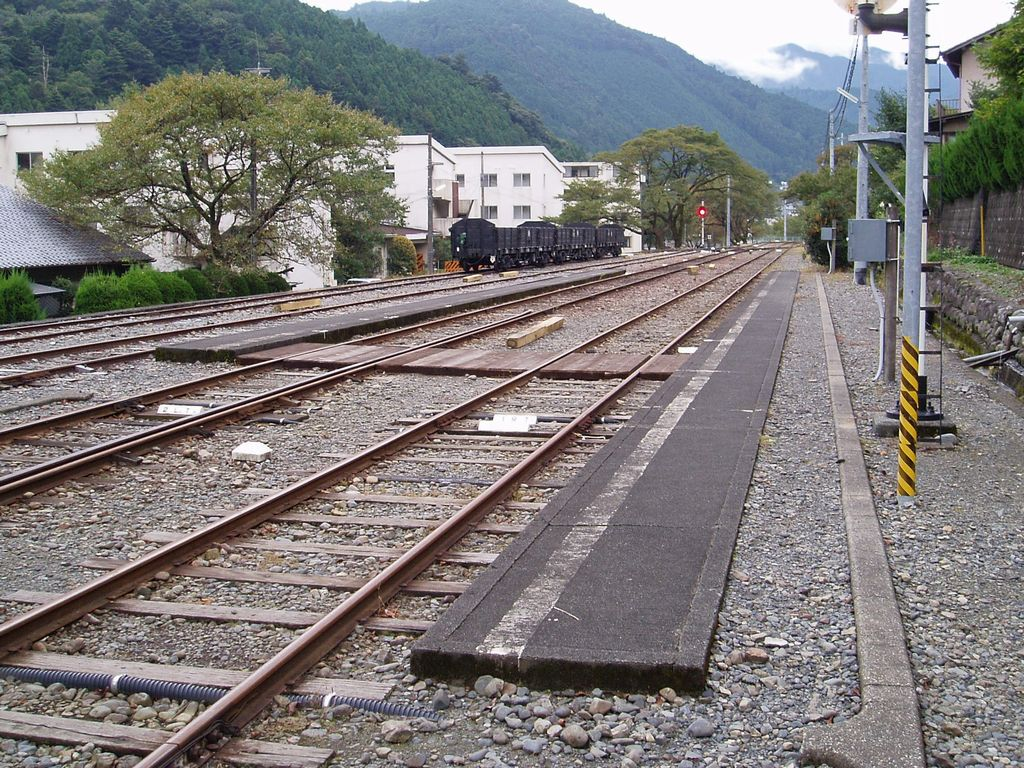
Kawane-Ryōgoku Station

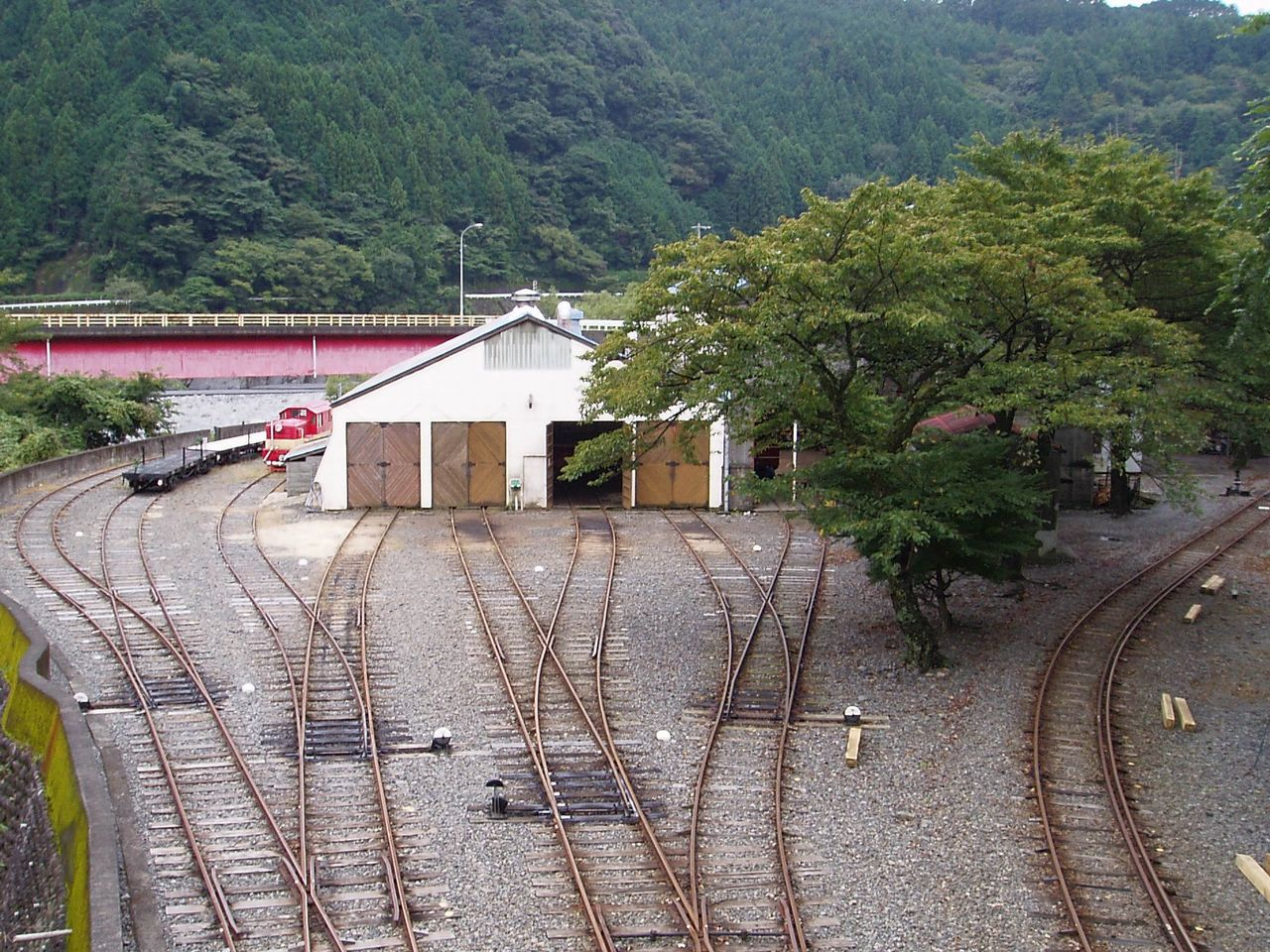
Kawane-Ryōgoku Rail Yards

Kawane-Ryōgoku Station (川根両国駅, Kawane-Ryōgoku-eki) is a train station in the town of Kawanehon, Haibara District, Shizuoka Prefecture, Japan, operated by the Ōigawa Railway.

== Lines ==
Kawane-Ryōgoku Station is served by the Ikawa Line, and is located 1.1 kilometers from the official starting point of the line at Senzu.

== Station layout ==
The station has a single side platform joined to an island platform by a level crossing. Only two tracks are in regular use, with the track on the far side of the island platform and a shunt track used for maintenance and for freight services. The small station building is staffed.

== Adjacent stations ==
| « | Service | » |
Ōigawa Railway
Ikawa Line
| Senzu | - | Sawama |

== Station history ==
Kawane-Ryōgoku Station was opened on August 1, 1959. The main rail yard for the Ōigawa Railway is located at this station.

== Passenger statistics ==
In fiscal 2017, the station was used by an average of 3 passengers daily (boarding passengers only).

== Surrounding area ==
- Oi River

== See also ==
- List of railway stations in Japan
