= Ikawa =

Ikawa may refer to:

- Ikawa, Akita, a town in Akita Prefecture
- Ikawa, Shizuoka, a former village in Shizuoka Prefecture
- Ikawa, Tokushima, a former town in Tokushima Prefecture
- Ōigawa Railway Ikawa Line, a railway line in Shizuoka Prefecture
  - Ikawa Station, a railway station
