= Tanokuchi Station =

Railway station in Kawanehon, Shizuoka Prefecture, Japan

Coordinates: 35°03′05″N 138°05′44″E

Tanoguchi Station 田野口駅
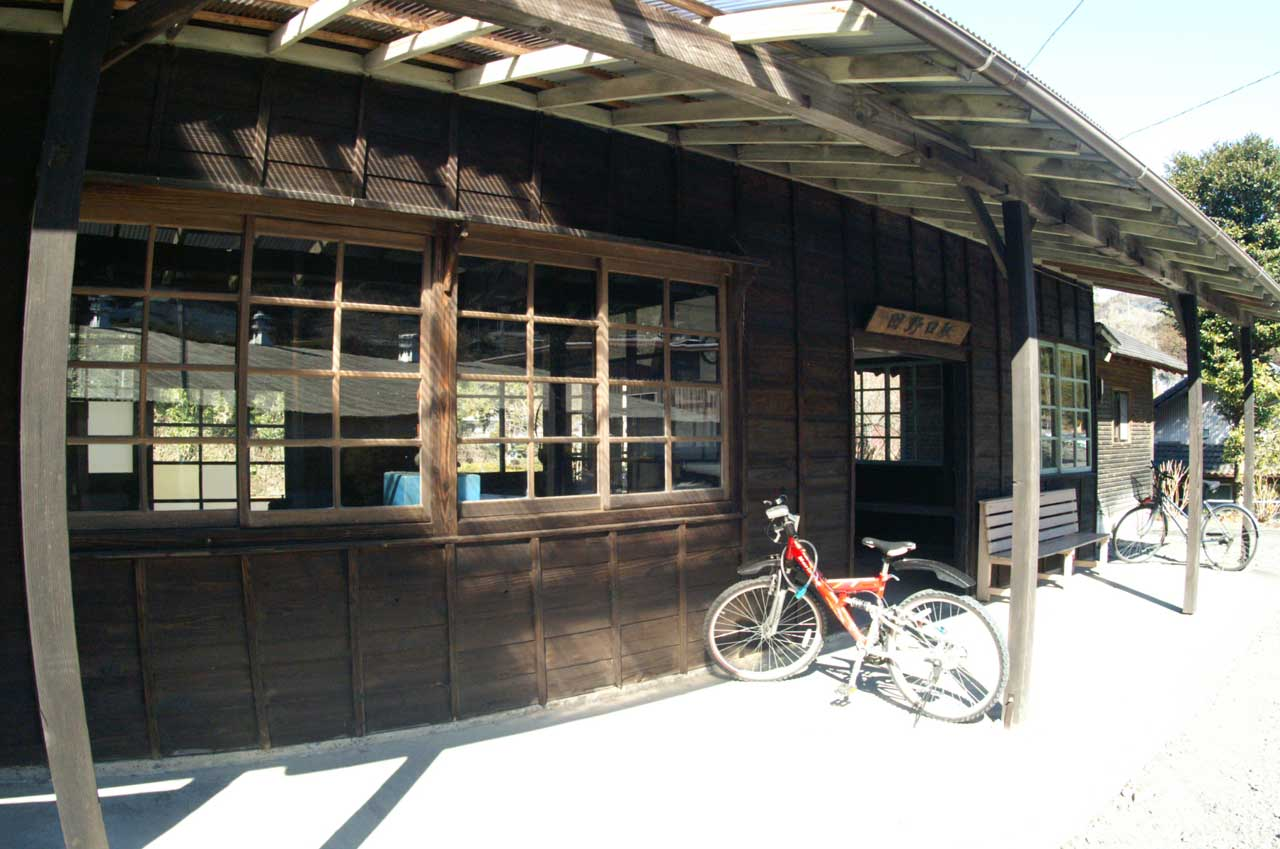
- Tanoguchi Station in March 2008

General information
- Location: Tanoguchi, Kawanehon-cho, Haibara-gun, Shizuoka-ken; Japan
- Operator: Ōigawa Railway
- Line: ■ Ōigawa Main Line
- Distance: 31.0 kilometers from Kanaya
- Platforms: 1 island platform

Other information
- Status: Unstaffed

History
- Opened: July 16, 1930

Passengers
- FY2017: 6 daily
Location
- Location within Shizuoka Prefecture Location within Japan

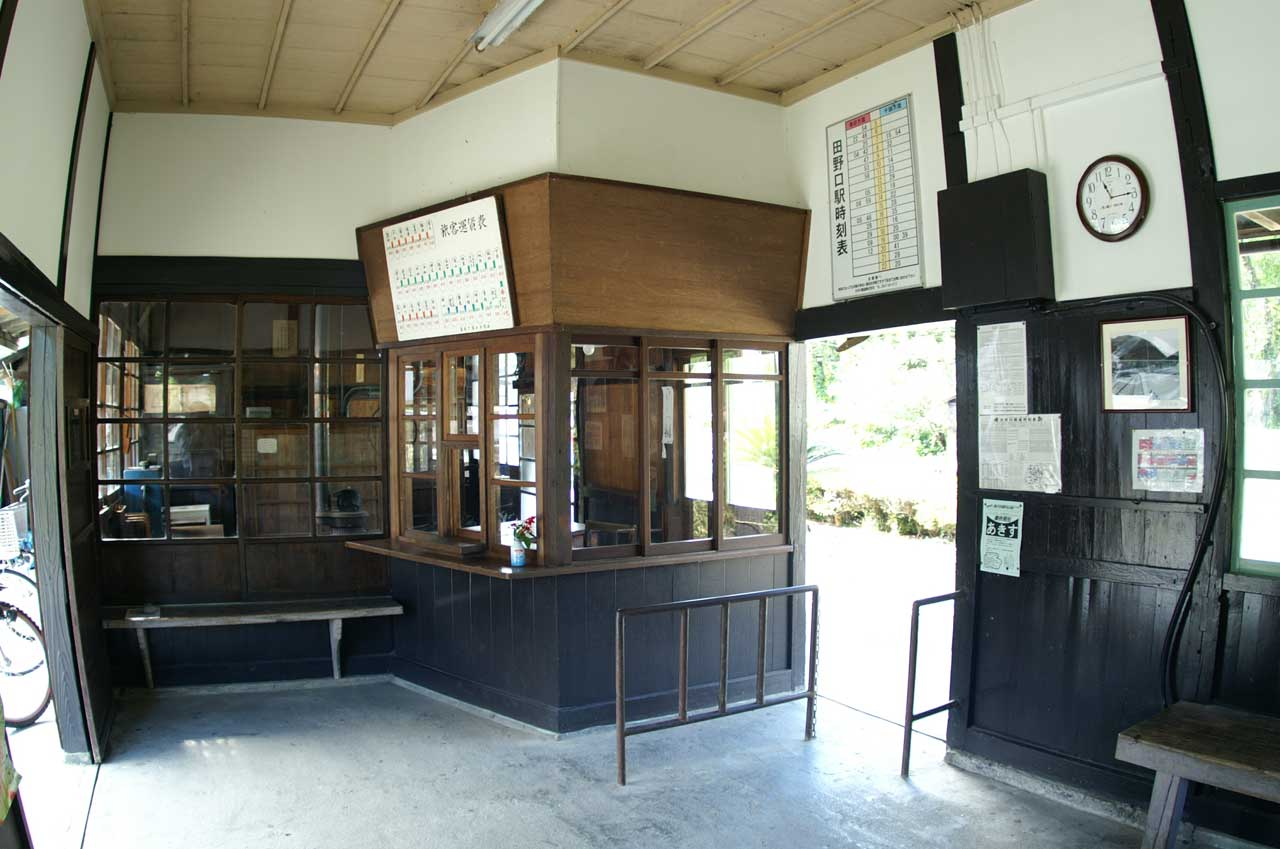
Interior

Tanokuchi Station (田野口駅, Tanokuchi-eki) is a railway station in the town of Kawanehon, Haibara District, Shizuoka Prefecture, Japan, operated by the Ōigawa Railway.

== Lines ==
Tanokuchi Station is served by the Ōigawa Main Line and is located 31.0 kilometers from the official starting point of the line at Kanaya.

== Station layout ==
The station has a single island platform connected to a small wooden station building by a level crossing. The station is unattended. It retains much of the atmosphere of the early Shōwa period and is often used as a set for movies and TV dramas.

== Station history ==
Tanoguchi Station was one of the original stations of the Ōigawa Main Line and was opened on April 12, 1931.

== Passenger statistics ==
In fiscal 2017, the station was used by an average of 6 passengers daily (boarding passengers only).

== Surrounding area ==
- Oi River
- Kawanehon town hall

== Adjacent stations ==
«	Service	»
Ōigawa Railway
Ōigawa Main Line
SL Express: Does not stop at this station
Shimoizumi	Local	Suruga-Tokuyama

== See also ==
- List of railway stations in Japan
