= Ōigawa Dam =

Oigawa Dam
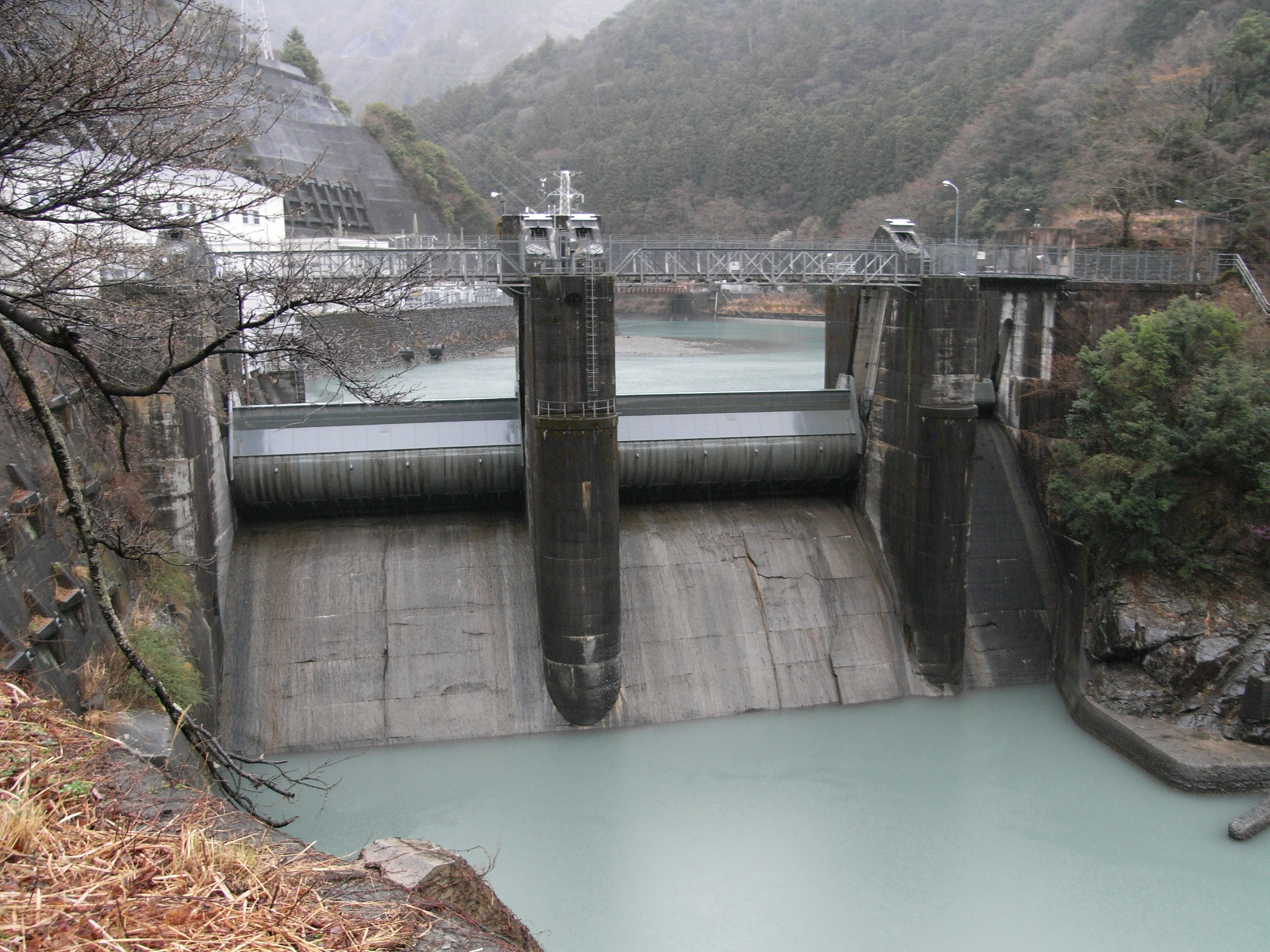
- Interactive map of Oigawa Dam
- Official name: 大井川ダム
- Location: Shizuoka Prefecture, Japan
- Coordinates: 35°9′52.67″N 138°8′33.56″E
- Construction began: 1934
- Opening date: 1936
- Operator: Chubu Electric Power

Dam and spillways
- Impounds: Ōi River
- Height: 33.5 meters
- Length: 65.8 meters

Reservoir
- Total capacity: 788,000 m3
- Catchment area: 537 km2
- Surface area: 13 hectares

The Ōigawa Dam (大井川ダム, Ōigawa damu) is a dam on the Ōi River in Haibara District, Kawanehon, Shizuoka Prefecture on the island of Honshū, Japan. It has a hydroelectric power generating station owned by the Chubu Electric Power Company.

== History ==
The potential of the Ōi River valley for hydroelectric power development was realized by the Meiji government at the start of the 20th century. The Ōi River was characterized by a high volume of flow and a fast current. Its mountainous upper reaches and tributaries were areas of steep valleys and abundant rainfall, and were sparsely populated.

In 1906, a joint venture company, the Anglo-Japanese Hydroelectric Company (日英水力電気, Nichiei Suiryoku Denki) was established, and began studies and design work on plans to exploit the potential of the Ōi River and Fuji River in Shizuoka Prefecture. The British interests were bought out by 1921. The Ōigawa Dam was the second dam to be constructed on the main stream of the Ōi River. Construction began in 1934 and was completed in 1936. Electrical production was nationalized under the aegis of the Japan Electric Generation and Transmission Company (日本発送電株式会社, Nippon Hassoden K.K.) in 1938, which was divided after World War II into regional power corporations. The Oikawa Dam is now operated and maintained by the Chubu Electric Power Company.

== Design ==
Construction of the Ōigawa Dam was facilitated by its location on the Ōigawa Railway Ikawa Line, which was built largely to more materials and works up the Ōi River valley for dam construction. The design is a solid-core concrete gravity dam. The associated Ōigawa Hydroelectric Power Plant produces 68,200 KW of power.

== Surroundings ==
Public access to the dam and its lake are by Shizuoka Prefectural Road 60, with bus connections to Shizuoka Station or Shin-Shizuoka Station.
