= Honkawane, Shizuoka =

Honkawane 本川根町
- Former municipality
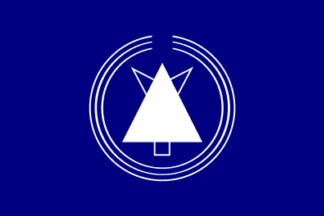
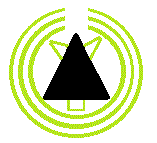
- Flag Emblem

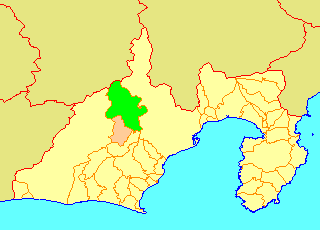
- Location of Honkawane in Shizuoka Prefecture
- Country: Japan
- Region: Chūbu (Tōkai)
- Prefecture: Shizuoka Prefecture
- District: Haibara
- Merged: September 20, 2005 (now part of Kawanehon)

Area
  - Total: 375.35 km^{2} (144.92 sq mi)

Population (September 1, 2005)
  - Total: 3,025
  - Density: 8.06/km^{2} (20.9/sq mi)
- Time zone: UTC+09:00 (JST)
- Symbols
- Bird: Japanese bush-warbler
- Flower: Azalea
- Tree: Hinoki

Honkawane (本川根町, Honkawane-chō) was a town located in Haibara District, Shizuoka Prefecture, Japan.

Kamikawane and Higashikawane were two of a series of villages established in Haibara District on October 1, 1889. Kamikawane and Higashikawane Villages were merged to create Honkawane Town on September 30, 1956.

As of September 1, 2005, the town had an estimated population of 3,025 and a density of 8.06 persons per km^{2}. The total area was 375.35 km^{2}. The area is noted for its production of green tea.

On September 20, 2005, Honkawane, along with the town of Nakakawane (also from Haibara District), was merged to create the town of Kawanehon.
