= Nakakawane, Shizuoka =

Nakakawane 中川根町
- Former municipality
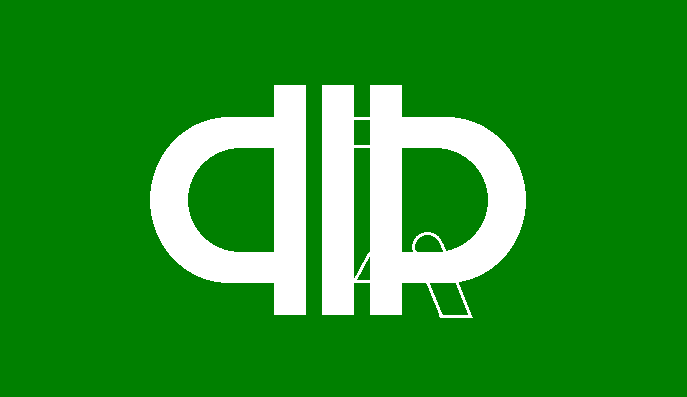
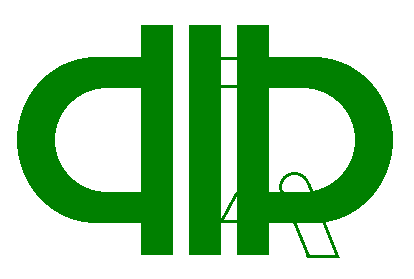
- Flag Seal

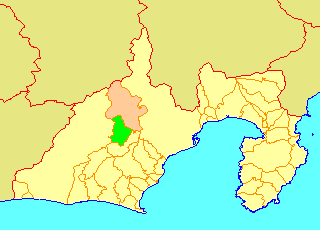
- Location of Nakakawane in Shizuoka Prefecture

- Location in Japan
- Coordinates: 35.0464°N 138.0860°E
- Country: Japan
- Region: Chūbu (Tōkai)
- Prefecture: Shizuoka Prefecture
- District: Haibara
- Merged: September 20, 2005 (now part of Kawanehon)

Area
  - Total: 121.37 km^{2} (46.86 sq mi)

Population (April 1, 2005)
  - Total: 6,022
  - Density: 49.65/km^{2} (128.6/sq mi)
- Time zone: UTC+09:00 (JST)
- Symbols
- Flower: Azalea
- Tree: Cryptomeria

Nakakawane (中川根町, Nakakawane-chō) was a town located in Haibara District, Shizuoka Prefecture, Japan.

As of September 1, 2005, the town had an estimated population of 6,022 and a density of 49.65 persons per km^{2}. The total area was 121.37 km^{2}. The area is famous for its green tea production.

On September 20, 2005, Nakakawane, along with the town of Honkawane (also from Haibara District), was merged to create the town of Kawanehon.
