= Ikawa Line =

Railway line in Shizuoka prefecture, Japan

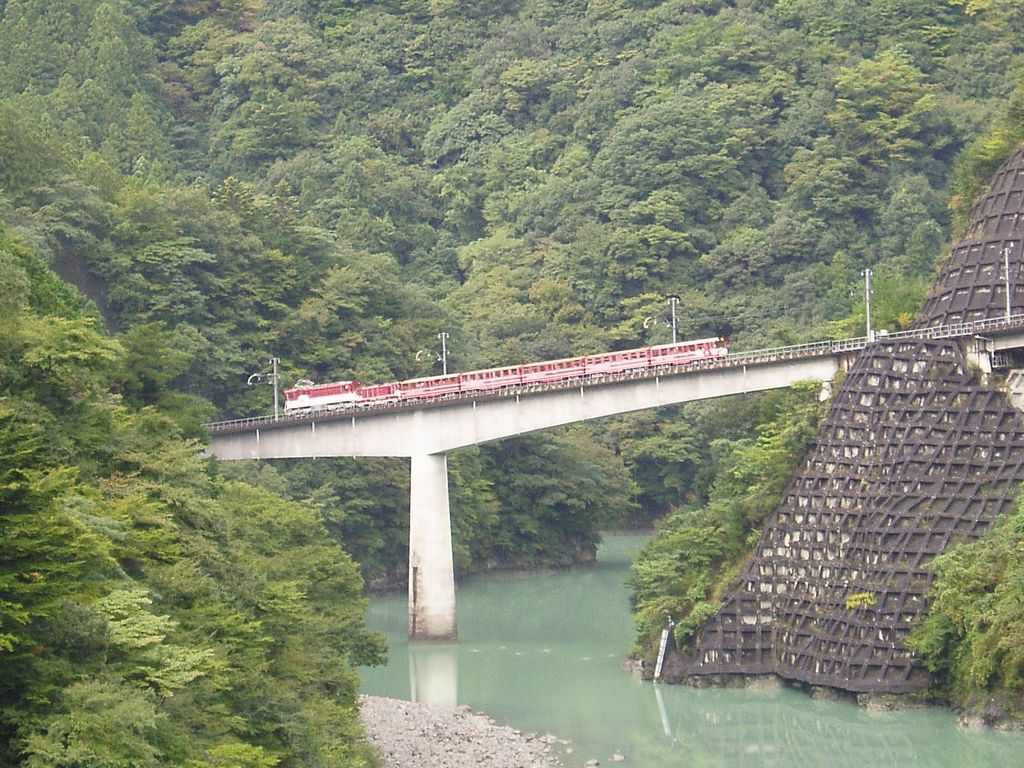
- A train on the Ikawa Line

Overview
- Locale: Shizuoka Prefecture
- Termini: Senzu; Ikawa
- Stations: 14
- Website: https://daitetsu.jp/

Service
- Type: Heavy rail
- Operator: Ōigawa Railway

History
- Opened: 1935; 91 years ago

Technical
- Line length: 25.5 km (15.8 mi); 1.5 km (0.93 mi) rack portion
- Rack system: Abt
- Track gauge: 1,067 mm (3 ft 6 in) (Abt rack system)
- Electrification: 1,500 V DC overhead (rack portion only)

The Ikawa Line (井川線, Ikawa-sen) is a railway line of the Ōigawa Railway. It runs from Senzu Station in Kawanehon, Shizuoka, the end station of the Ōigawa Main Line, and terminates at Ikawa Station in Aoi-ku, Shizuoka. The line has 61 tunnels and 51 bridges along its 25.5 kilometer length and includes the only rack-and-pinion railway section currently operating in Japan.

In September 2022, the Ōigawa Main Line suffered substantial damage from Tropical Storm Talas. Rail services between Kawane-Onsen Sasamado and Senzu Station were suspended until further notice. Steam locomotives were changed to only operate between Shin-Kanaya and Kawane-Onsen Sasamado. Ōigawa Railway advises customers intending to travel beyond Ieyama Station to the Ikawa Line, towards Senzu and the Sumata Gorge area, to transfer to Kawanehon Town's community buses at Ieyama Station, which provide connections to Senzu Station.

== History ==
The Ikawa line began operations on March 20, 1935, as a private line for the Ōigawa Electric Company, to carry workers and materials upstream to facilitate dam construction. The single track line was originally constructed with 762 mm (2 ft 6 in) narrow gauge; however, in order to have dual usage with carriages on the Senzu-Shinrin Line (now closed) a third rail was added the following year for the Japanese standard gauge (1,067 mm (3 ft 6 in)). In 1954, the line was extended under the aegis of the Chubu Electric Power Company to facilitate the construction of the Ōigawa Dam. Railway operations were spun out of Chubu Electric into a separate company in 1959, with the foundation of the Ōigawa Railway Company. With the completion of the Nagashima Dam, a portion of the line had to be re-routed along a 1.5 km section with a maximum gradient of 9% (~1 in 11). This required the installation of an Abt rack system on October 2, 1990. An automatic train stop system was installed at the end of March 2009.

== Services ==
All trains are hauled by diesel locomotives (DD20 type) with passenger cars attached. Due to the steep grade, in the section between Abt Ichishiro Station and Nagashima Dam Station trains have an electric Abt rack locomotive (ED90 type) attached.

== Stations ==
Name		Distance (km)	Connections	Location	
Senzu	千頭	0.0	Ōigawa Railway Ōigawa Main Line	Shizuoka	Kawanehon, Haibara District
Kawane-Ryōgoku	川根両国	1.1		Shizuoka	Kawanehon, Haibara District
Sawama	沢間	2.4		Shizuoka	Kawanehon, Haibara District
Domoto	土本	3.9		Shizuoka	Kawanehon, Haibara District
Kawane-Koyama	川根小山	5.8		Shizuoka	Kawanehon, Haibara District
Okuizumi	奥泉	7.5		Shizuoka	Kawanehon, Haibara District
Abt Ichishiro	アプトいちしろ	9.9	Electric Abt rack locomotive attached between Abt Ischishiro and Nagashima Dam	Shizuoka	Kawanehon, Haibara District
Nagashima Dam	長島ダム	11.4	Electric Abt rack locomotive attached between Abt Ischishiro and Nagashima Dam	Shizuoka	Kawanehon, Haibara District
Hiranda	ひらんだ	12.6		Shizuoka	Kawanehon, Haibara District
Okuōikojō	奥大井湖上	13.9		Shizuoka	Kawanehon, Haibara District
Sessokyō Onsen	接岨峡温泉	15.5		Shizuoka	Kawanehon, Haibara District
Omori	尾盛	17.8		Shizuoka	Kawanehon, Haibara District
Kanzō	閑蔵	20.5		Shizuoka	Aoi-ku, Shizuoka
Ikawa	井川	25.5		Shizuoka	Aoi-ku, Shizuoka

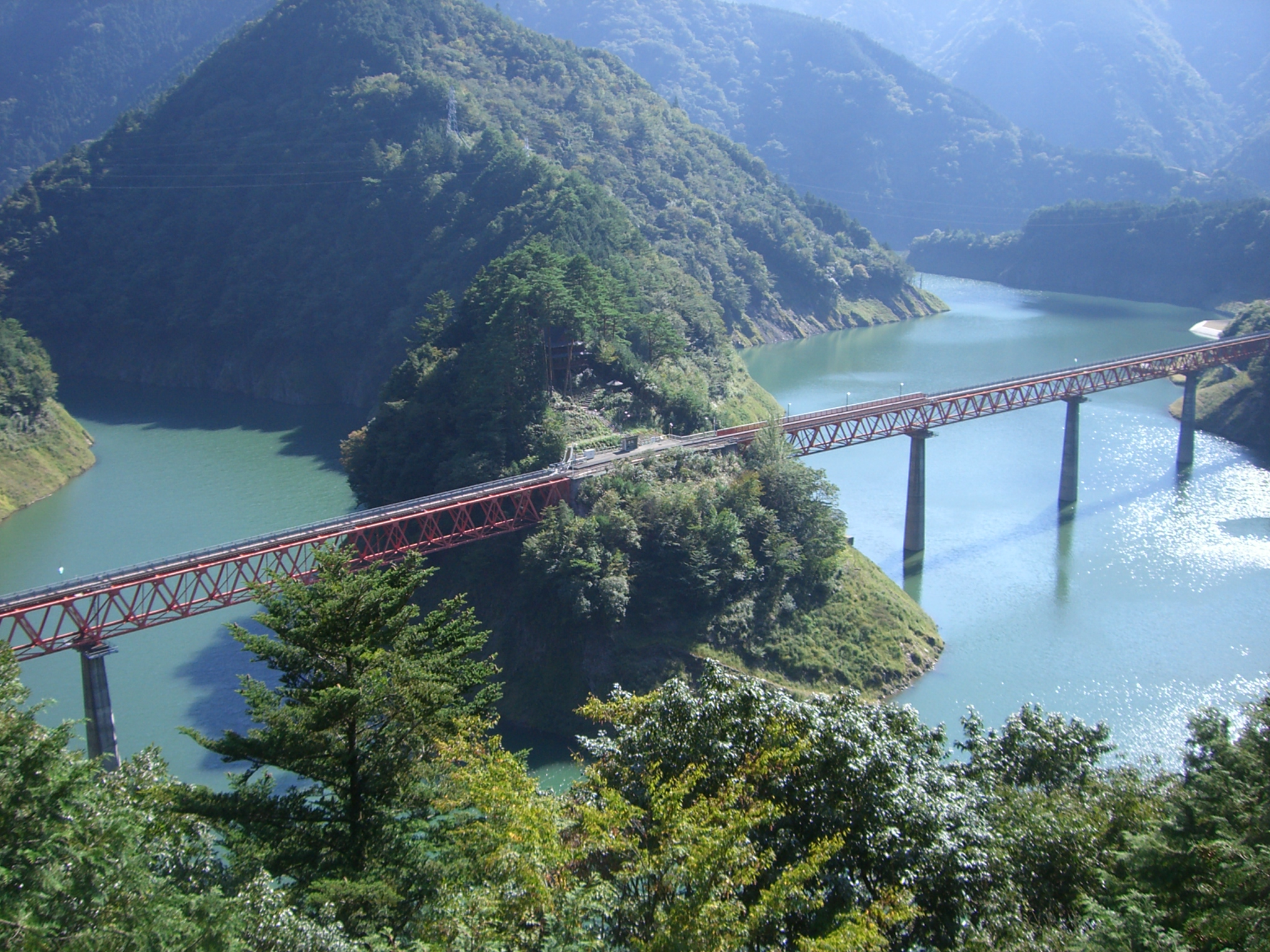
Okuoi Rainbow Bridge

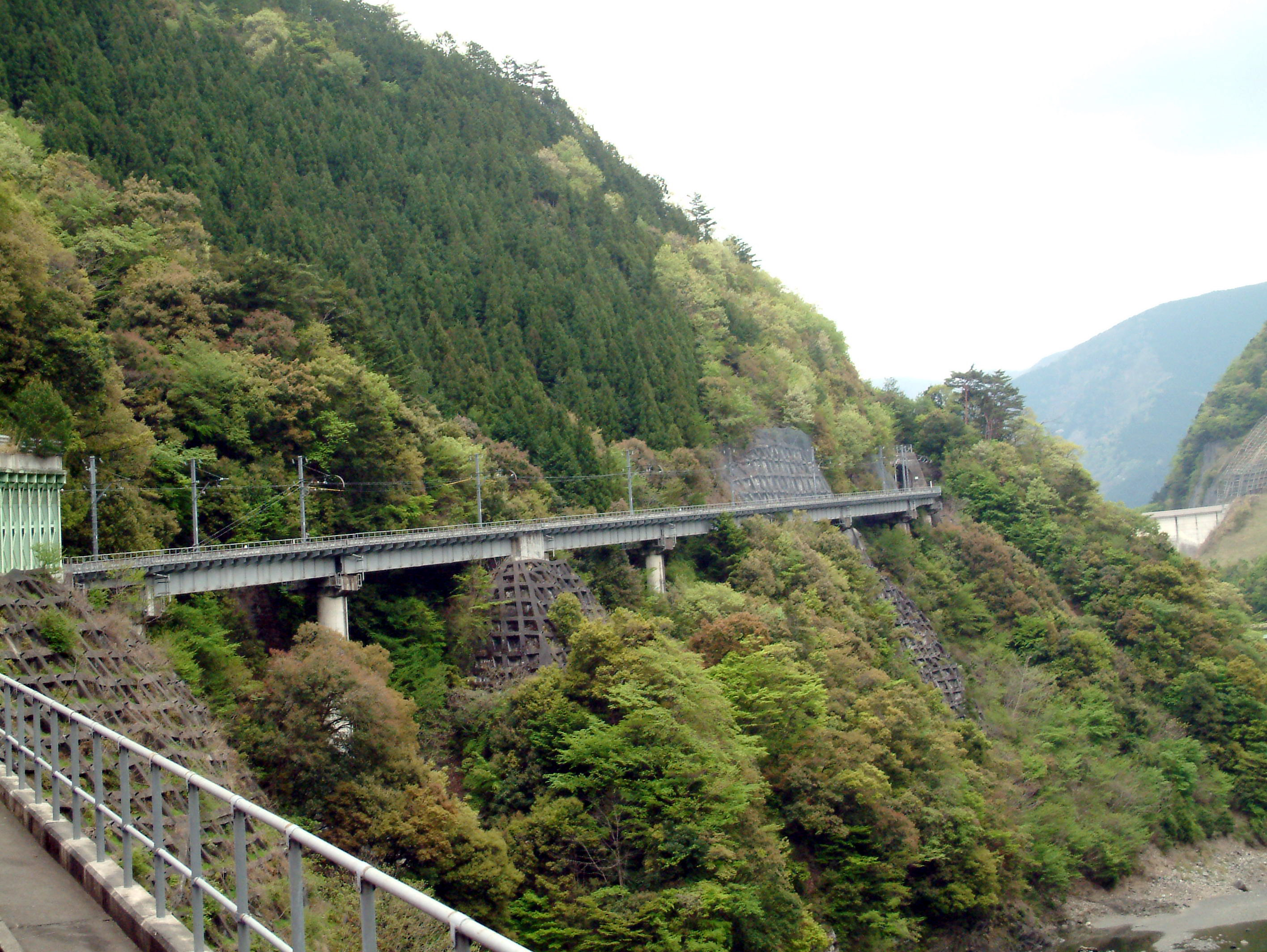
Mountainous terrain

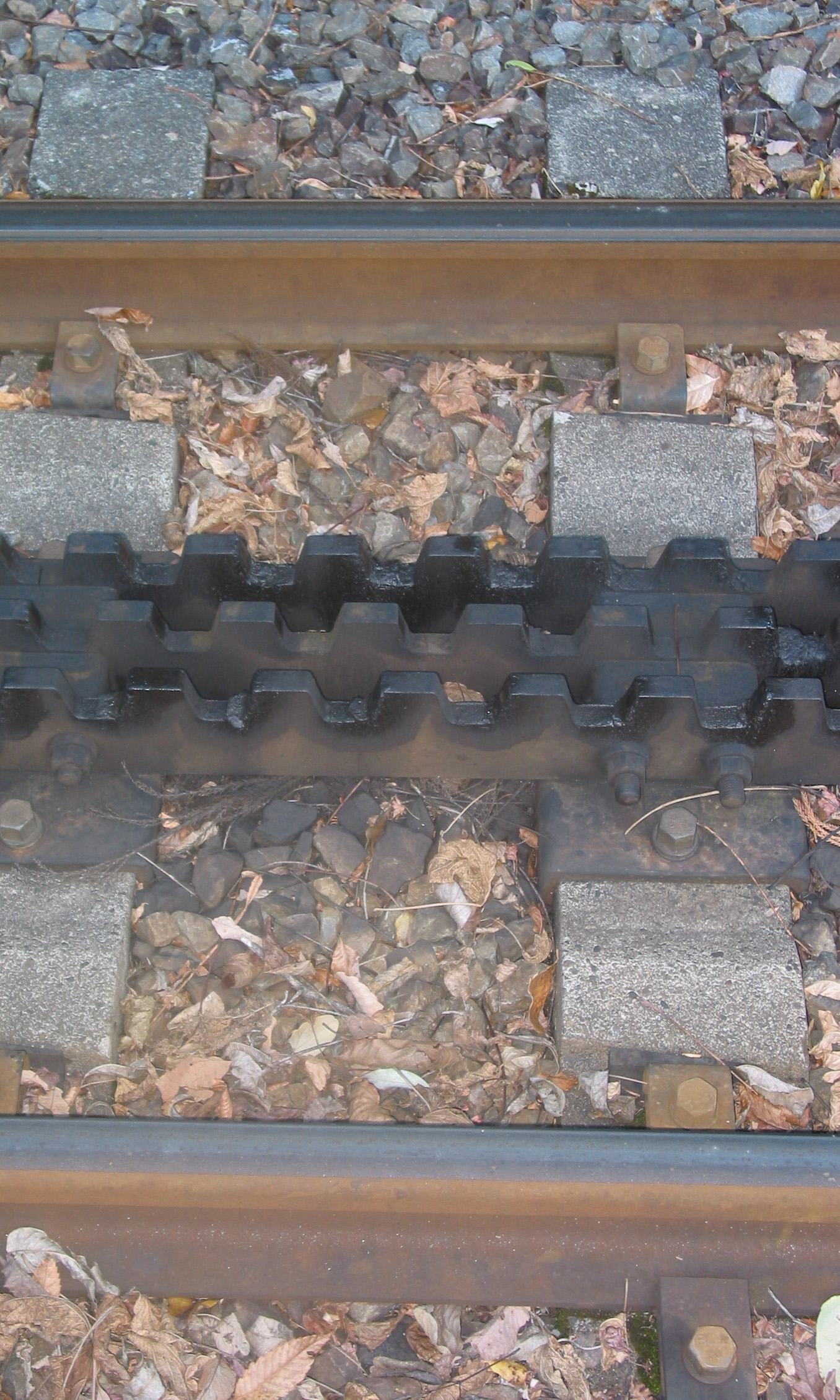
Abt rack rail

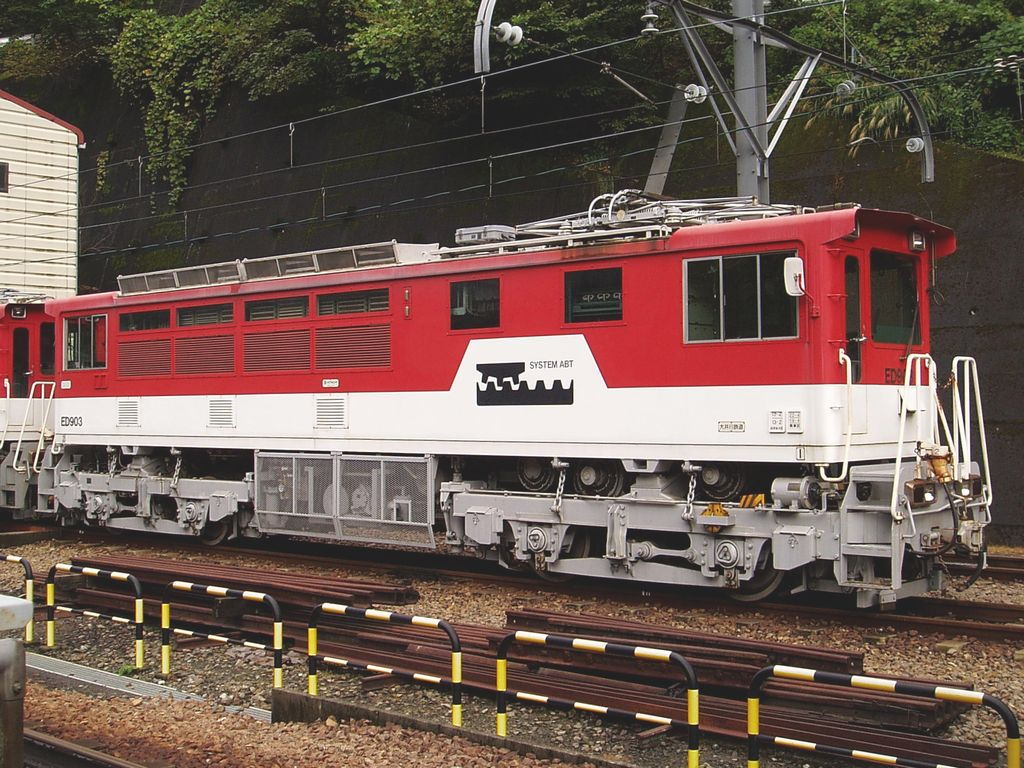
Oigawa ED903 rack locomotive

== See also ==
- List of railway lines in Japan
