= Kawanehon =

Kawanehon 川根本町
- Town
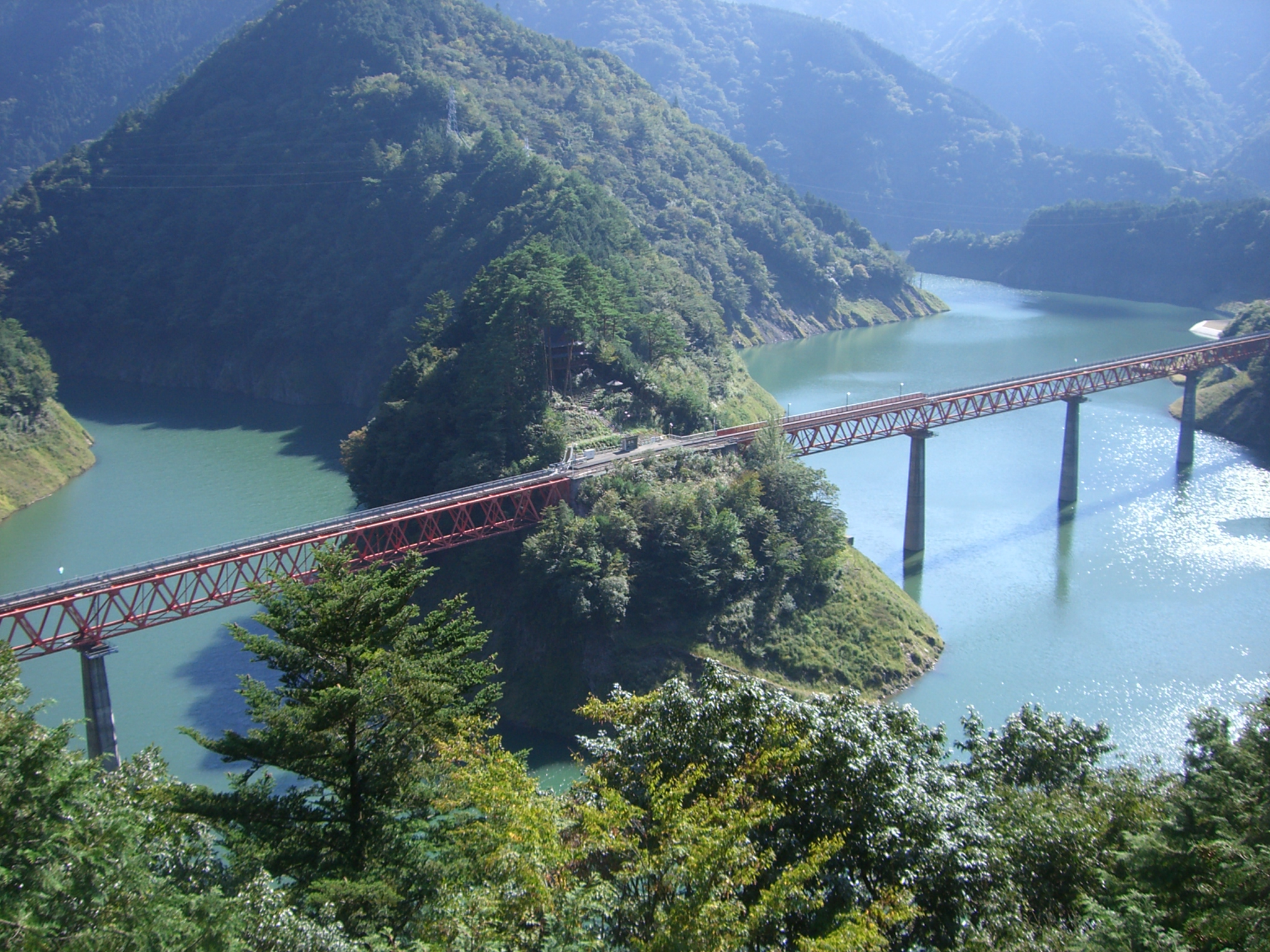
- Ōigawa Railway in Kawanehon Town

- Flag Seal

- Location of Kawanehon in Shizuoka Prefecture

- Coordinates: 35°2′49″N 138°4′53.9″E
- Country: Japan
- Region: Chūbu; Tōkai
- Prefecture: Shizuoka
- District: Haibara

Area
  - Total: 496.88 km^{2} (191.85 sq mi)

Population (August 2019)
  - Total: 6,731
  - Density: 13.55/km^{2} (35.09/sq mi)
- Time zone: UTC+9 (Japan Standard Time)
- Phone number: 547-56-1117
- Address: 627 Kaminagao, Kawanehon-chō, Haibara-gun, Shizuoka-ken 428-0313
- Climate: Cfa
- Website: Official website
- Symbols
- Flower: Rhododendron quinquefolium
- Tree: Japanese beech

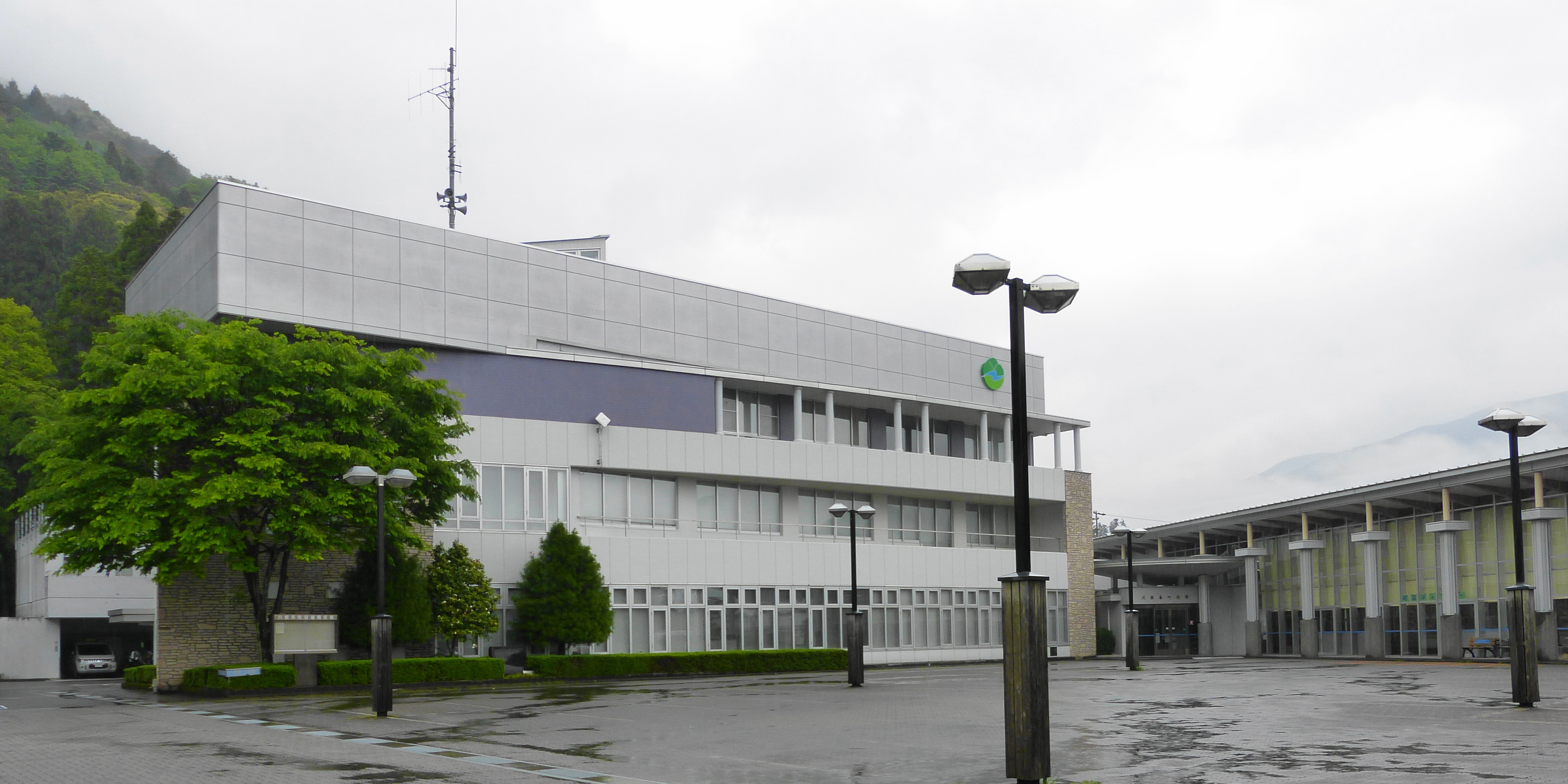
Kawanehon Town Hall

Kawanehon (川根本町, Kawanehon-chō) is a town located in Haibara District, Shizuoka Prefecture, Japan. As of 1 August 2019, the town had an estimated population of 6,731 in 2,895 households and a population density of 13.4 persons per km^{2}. The total area of the town was 496.88 square kilometres (191.85 sq mi).

== Geography ==
Kawanehon is located in north-central Shizuoka, along the upper reaches of the Ōi River, with approximately 90% of the town area covered in forest and mountains. It is bordered to the north by the Japanese Alps, with peaks ranging to 2400 meters. Forests range from Siebold's Beech at lower elevations to Siberian Dwarf Pine at higher altitudes, and wildlife include wild boar and kamoshika. The area enjoys a temperate maritime climate with hot, humid summers and mild, cool winters.

=== Surrounding municipalities ===
Shizuoka Prefecture

- Aoi-ku, Shizuoka city
- Tenryū-ku, Hamamatsu
- Shimada

Nagano Prefecture

- Iida

=== Climate ===
The town has a climate characterized by hot and humid summers, and relatively mild winters (Köppen climate classification Cfa). The average annual temperature in Kawanehon is 14.0 °C (57.2 °F). The average annual rainfall is 3,103.4 mm (122.18 in) with September as the wettest month. The temperatures are highest on average in August, at around 25.2 °C (77.4 °F), and lowest in January, at around 3.0 °C (37.4 °F).

Climate data for Kawanehon (1991−2020 normals, extremes 1978−present)
Month	Jan	Feb	Mar	Apr	May	Jun	Jul	Aug	Sep	Oct	Nov	Dec	Year
Record high °C (°F)	19.3 (66.7)	24.8 (76.6)	26.5 (79.7)	30.3 (86.5)	33.2 (91.8)	37.5 (99.5)	38.7 (101.7)	39.6 (103.3)	37.3 (99.1)	32.1 (89.8)	26.3 (79.3)	21.6 (70.9)	39.6 (103.3)
Mean daily maximum °C (°F)	10.1 (50.2)	11.2 (52.2)	14.4 (57.9)	19.4 (66.9)	23.8 (74.8)	26.3 (79.3)	30.2 (86.4)	31.4 (88.5)	27.7 (81.9)	22.5 (72.5)	17.3 (63.1)	12.2 (54.0)	20.5 (69.0)
Daily mean °C (°F)	3.0 (37.4)	4.2 (39.6)	7.6 (45.7)	12.6 (54.7)	17.1 (62.8)	20.6 (69.1)	24.4 (75.9)	25.2 (77.4)	21.9 (71.4)	16.4 (61.5)	10.4 (50.7)	5.1 (41.2)	14.0 (57.3)
Mean daily minimum °C (°F)	−2.6 (27.3)	−1.9 (28.6)	1.6 (34.9)	6.6 (43.9)	11.4 (52.5)	16.2 (61.2)	20.3 (68.5)	21.0 (69.8)	17.9 (64.2)	11.9 (53.4)	5.3 (41.5)	−0.3 (31.5)	9.0 (48.1)
Record low °C (°F)	−10.6 (12.9)	−10.5 (13.1)	−8.0 (17.6)	−3.5 (25.7)	1.3 (34.3)	7.8 (46.0)	12.9 (55.2)	14.5 (58.1)	8.3 (46.9)	0.6 (33.1)	−3.6 (25.5)	−9.5 (14.9)	−10.6 (12.9)
Average precipitation mm (inches)	97.7 (3.85)	134.8 (5.31)	247.0 (9.72)	260.3 (10.25)	267.6 (10.54)	336.7 (13.26)	431.1 (16.97)	328.3 (12.93)	439.5 (17.30)	292.4 (11.51)	169.8 (6.69)	100.7 (3.96)	3,103.4 (122.18)
Average precipitation days (≥ 1.0 mm)	5.8	6.5	10.5	10.9	11.4	13.9	14.2	13.0	13.3	11.5	7.8	6.5	125.3
Mean monthly sunshine hours	193.0	179.6	187.7	185.8	177.5	119.1	142.4	171.1	131.1	152.0	168.0	185.4	1,993.9
Source: Japan Meteorological Agency

== Demographics ==
Per Japanese census data, the population of Kawanehon has declined by roughly two-thirds over the past 80 years.

Historical population
Year	Pop.	±%
1940	18,767	—
1950	18,610	−0.8%
1960	18,511	−0.5%
1970	15,205	−17.9%
1980	12,776	−16.0%
1990	11,126	−12.9%
2000	9,785	−12.1%
2010	8,074	−17.5%
2020	6,206	−23.1%

== History ==
Kawanehon is on the border between the former provinces of Suruga and Tōtōmi, and was mostly tenryō territory under direct control of the Tokugawa shogunate in the Edo period. With the establishment of the modern municipalities system in the early Meiji period in 1889, the area was reorganized into numerous villages within both Haibara and Shida Districts within Shizuoka Prefecture. Kawanehon was formed on September 20, 2005, by the merger of the former towns of Nakakawane and Honkawane, both from Haibara District.

== Economy ==
The economy of Kawanehon is dominated by forestry and the production of green tea, with tourism on the Ōigawa Railway and to hot spring resorts also playing a role.

== Education ==
- Kawanehon has four public elementary schools and two public middle schools operated by the town government. The town has one public high school operated by the Shizuoka Prefectural Board of Education.

== Transportation ==
=== Railway ===
- - Ōigawa Railway - Ōigawa Main Line
  - Jina - Shiogō - Shimoizumi - Tanokuchi - Suruga-Tokuyama - Aobe - Sakidaira - Senzu
- - Ōigawa Railway - Ikawa Line
  - Senzu - Kawane-Ryōgoku - Sawama - Domoto - Kawane-Koyama - Okuizumi - Abt Ichishiro - Nagashima Dam - Hiranda - Okuōikojō - Sessokyō-Onsen - Omori

=== Highway ===
- National Route 362
- National Route 473

== Local attractions ==
- The sound of the steam locomotives of Ōigawa Railway is listed as one of the 100 Soundscapes of Japan by the Ministry of the Environment
