= Ikawa Station =

Railway station in Shizuoka, Japan

Ikawa Station 井川駅
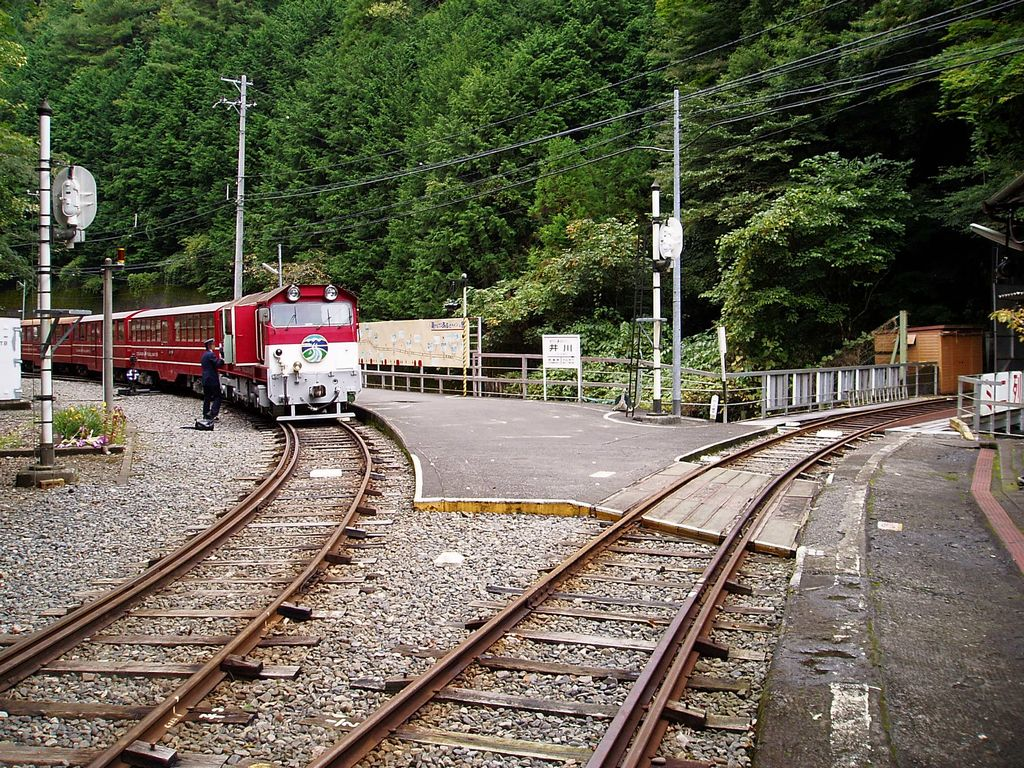
- Ikawa Station in October 2007

General information
- Location: Ikawa, Aoi-ku, Shizuoka-shi, Shizuoka-ken; Japan
- Coordinates: 35°12′44.58″N 138°13′16.60″E
- Elevation: 636 m (2,087 ft)
- Operator: Ōigawa Railway
- Line: ■ Ikawa Line
- Distance: 25.5 kilometers from Senzu
- Platforms: 1 island platform

Other information
- Status: Staffed

History
- Opened: August 1, 1959

Passengers
- FY2017: 118 daily
Location
- Location within Shizuoka Prefecture Location within Japan

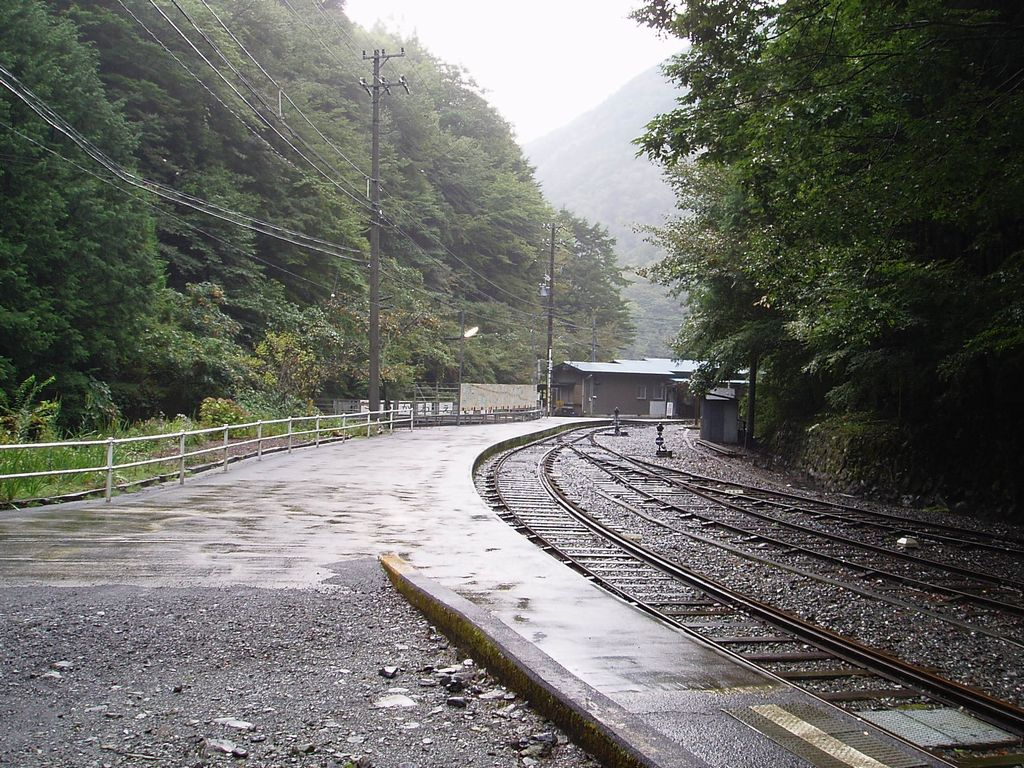
Ikawa Station

Ikawa Station (井川駅, Ikawa-eki) is a railway station Aoi Ward, Shizuoka City, Shizuoka Prefecture, Japan, operated by Ōigawa Railway. At an altitude of 636 metres (2,087 ft), it is the highest railway station in Shizuoka Prefecture.

== Lines ==
Ikawa Station is a terminus of the Ikawa Line, and is located 25.5 kilometers from the opposing terminal of the line at Senzu.

== Station layout ==
The station has a wedge-shaped island platform for two tracks. There is also a small station building.

== Adjacent stations ==
«	Service	»
Ōigawa Railway
Ikawa Line
Kanzō	-	Terminus

== Station history ==
Ikawa Station was opened on August 1, 1959.

== Passenger statistics ==
In fiscal 2017, the station was used by an average of 118 passengers daily (boarding passengers only).

== Surrounding area ==
- Ikawa Dam
- Ikawa District Community Bus
  - For Shirakaba-so
  - For Yokosawa
    - This route bus had been originally operated by Shizuoka Railway until 2009. Now, at the last stop Yokosawa, it enables to transfer onto the Shizutetsu Just Line route bus Abe Line No.119 travels to Shin-Shizuoka Station.

== See also ==
- List of railway stations in Japan
