= Senzu Station =

Railway station in Kawanehon, Shizuoka Prefecture, Japan

Senzu Station 千頭駅
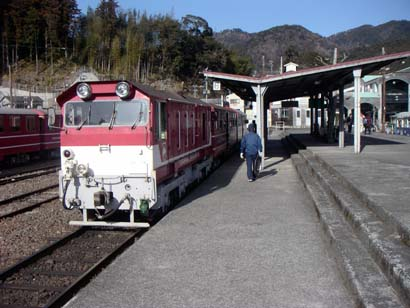
- Senzu Station

General information
- Location: Senzu, Kawanehon-cho, Haibara-gun, Shizuoka-ken; Japan
- Coordinates: 35.1077709°N 138.1365967°E
- Operator: Ōigawa Railway
- Lines: ■Ōigawa Main Line ■Ikawa Line
- Distance: 39.5 kilometers from Kanaya
- Platforms: 1 bay platform

Other information
- Status: Staffed

History
- Opened: December 1, 1931; 94 years ago

Passengers
- FY2017: 573 daily
Location
- Location within Shizuoka Prefecture Location within Japan

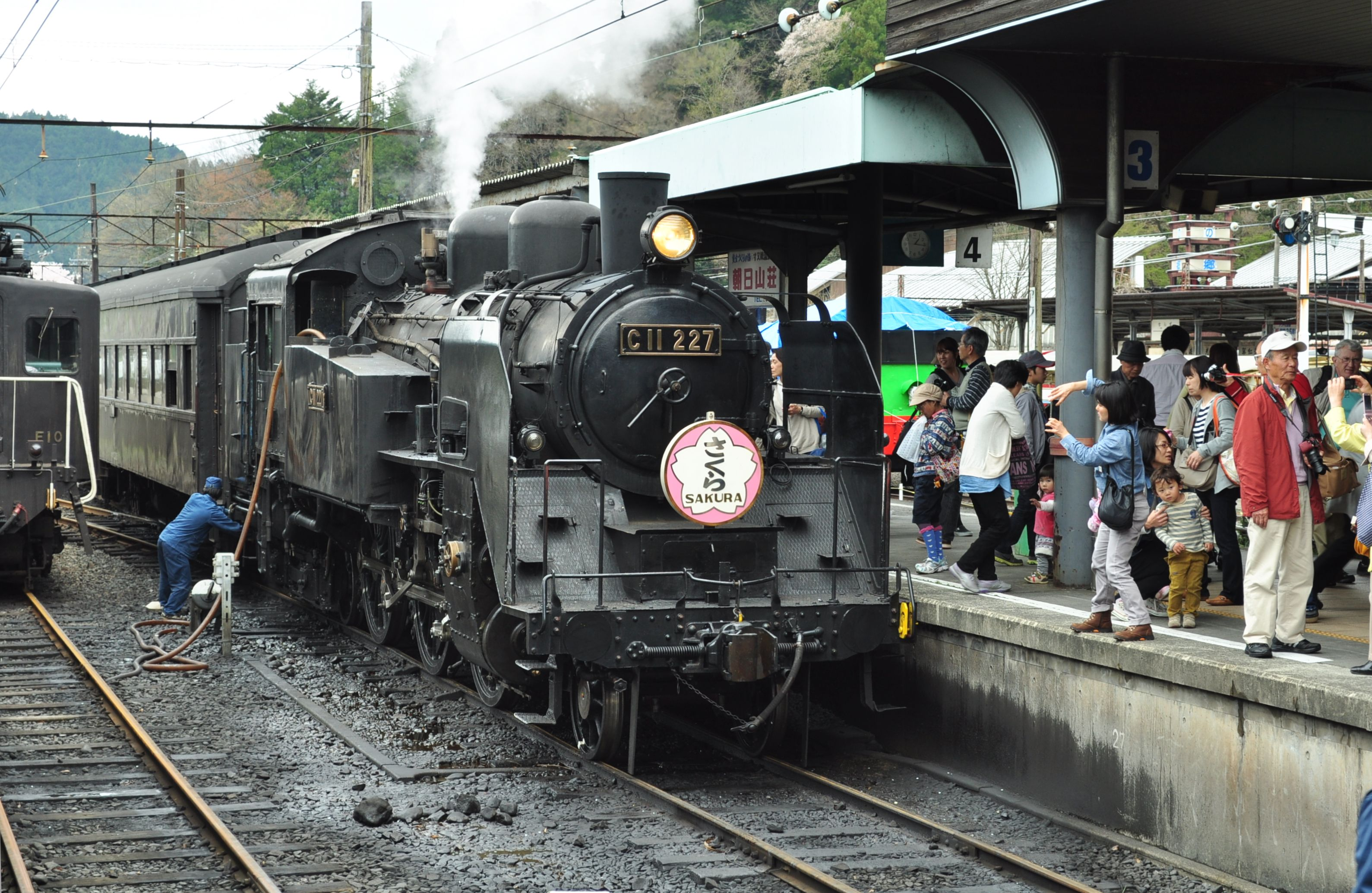
SL locomotive at Senzu Station

Senzu Station (千頭駅, Senzu-eki) is a railway station in the town of Kawanehon, Haibara District, Shizuoka Prefecture, Japan, operated by the Ōigawa Railway.

== Lines ==
Senzu Station is the terminal station for both the 39.5 kilometer Ōigawa Main Line and the 25.5 kilometer Ikawa Line.

== Station layout ==
The station has a bay platform for six tracks, only two of which are in regular use. The station building is also a local department store. The station retains a manually operated Ransomes & Rapier turntable for use by the line's steam locomotives. The station also maintains a small museum pertaining to the line's steam locomotive operations. The station is attended.

== Adjacent stations ==
«	Service	»
Ōigawa Railway
Ōigawa Main Line
Suruga-Tokuyama	SL Express	Terminus
Sakidaira	Local	Terminus
Ikawa Line
Terminus	-	Kawane-Ryōgoku

== Station history ==
Senzu Station was one of the original stations of the Ōigawa Main Line, and was opened on December 1, 1931.

== Passenger statistics ==
In fiscal 2017, the station was used by an average of 573 passengers daily (boarding passengers only).

== Surrounding area ==
- Kawanehon Junior High School
- Kahanehon Elementary School
- Japan National Route 362

== See also ==
- List of railway stations in Japan
