= Ōigawa Railway =

Railway company in Shizuoka Prefecture, Japan

- Native name: 大井川鐵道
- Type: Subsidiary
- Industry: Transportation
- Founded: March 10, 1925; 101 years ago
- Headquarters: Shimada, Shizuoka, Japan
- Area served: Shizuoka Prefecture
- Key people: Akira Torizuka (president)
- Total equity: 2.64 billion yen (2025)
- Parent: Eclipse Hidaka
- Subsidiaries: Daitetsu Advance
- Website: daitetsu.jp

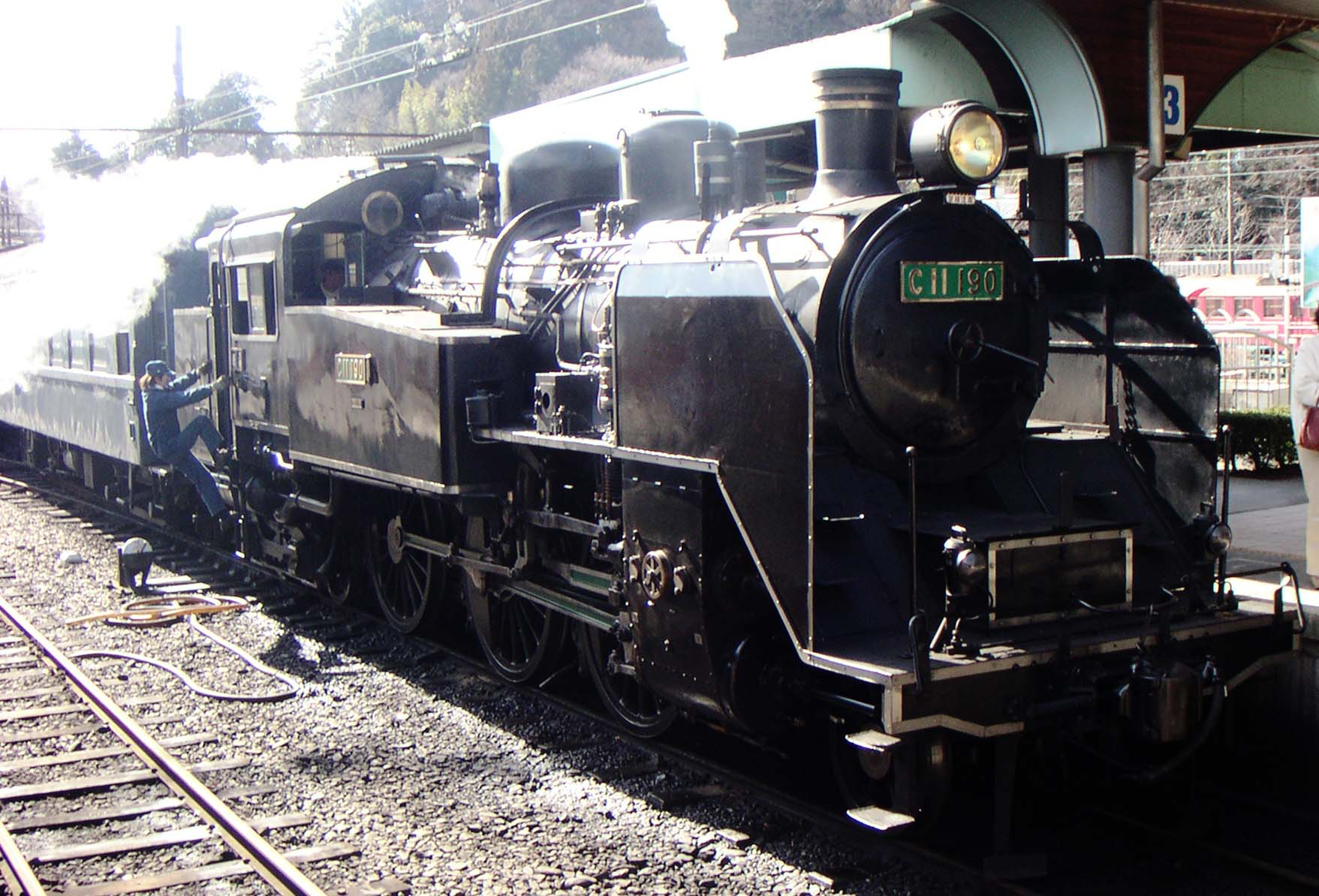
A Class C11 steam locomotive at Senzu Station on the Ōigawa Main Line

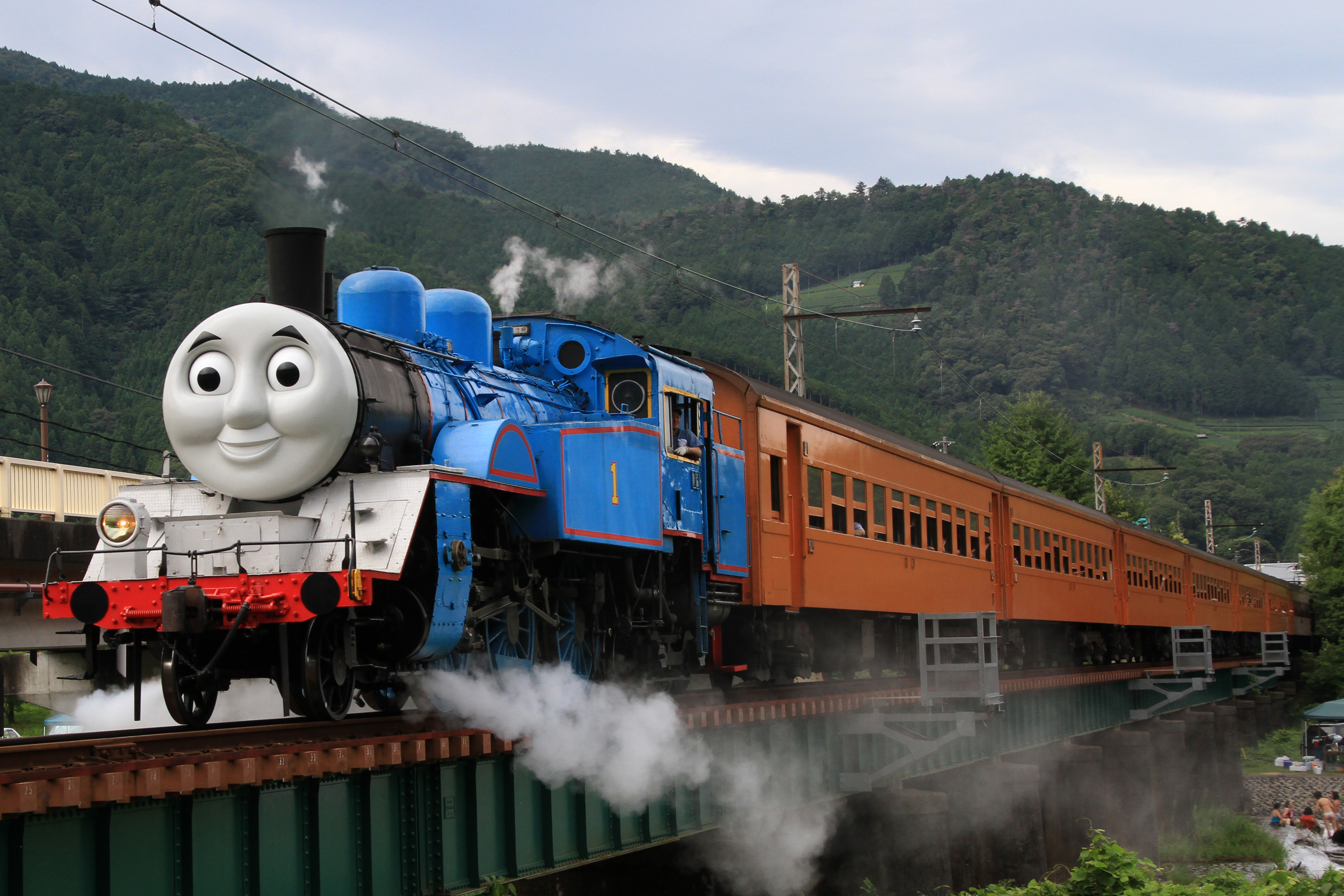
Class C11 227 Thomas the Tank Engine

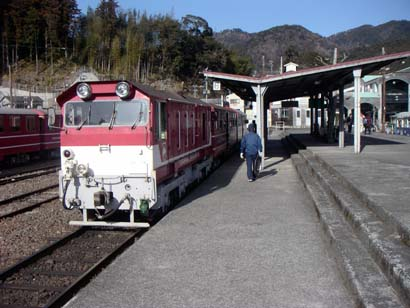
DD20 at Senzu Station on the Ikawa Line

Ōigawa Railway (大井川鐵道, Ōigawa Tetsudō) is a private railway company in Shizuoka Prefecture, Japan, founded in 1925. The company is commonly known as Daitetsu (大鉄 or 大鐵). The company was a subsidiary of the Meitetsu Group until 2015, when it was restructured and sold to Eclipse Hidaka, a food, hotel, and investment company headquartered in Hidaka, Hokkaido.

== History ==
=== Operation ===
The company operates preserved steam locomotives, and has "sister railway" agreements with the Brienz Rothorn Railway in Switzerland and the Alishan Forest Railway in Taiwan. Because of its historical rolling stock and the picturesque scenery, the Ōigawa Main Line is often used for shooting films or TV programs, especially those set in the pre-war period, and has been used as a setting in anime, such as in season 3 of Laid-Back Camp

Ōigawa Railway's locomotives include six characters from the Thomas & Friends series: Thomas the Tank Engine, James the Red Engine, Percy, Toby, Hiro, and Rusty. The locomotives are based at Shin-Kanaya Station. Thomas trains run between Shin-Kanaya and Kawaneonsen-Sasamado Station.

==== 2022 typhoon ====
In September 2022, the Ōigawa Main Line suffered substantial damage from Tropical Storm Talas. Rail services between Kawane-Onsen Sasamado and Senzu Station were suspended until further notice, and steam locomotives were changed to only operate between Shin-Kanaya and Kawane-Onsen Sasamado. Ōigawa Railway advises customers intending to travel beyond Ieyama Station, i.e. to the Ikawa Line, towards Senzu and the Sumata Gorge area, to transfer to Kawanehon Town's community buses at Ieyama Station, which provide connections to Senzu Station.

In June 2024, Akira Torizuka was brought in to serve as president of Oigawa Railway, and set a goal of raising ¥2.1 billion, with help from national and local governments, to restore the full Ōigawa Main Line by 2029.

== Lines ==
The company operates two 1,067 mm (3 ft 6 in) gauge railway lines:

- Ōigawa Main Line: Kanaya – Senzu
- Ikawa Line: Senzu – Ikawa

Both lines function primarily as sightseeing lines. The Ōigawa Main Line is known for its heritage steam trains, while the Ikawa Line is the only rack railway line in existence in Japan.

The company also operates a bus line near Sumatakyō Onsen in the town of Kawanehon.

== Stations ==
- Stations of Ōigawa Railway

== See also ==
- List of railway companies in Japan
