= Haibara District, Shizuoka =

District in Shizuoka prefecture, Japan

Coordinates: 34.769487°N 138.251717°E

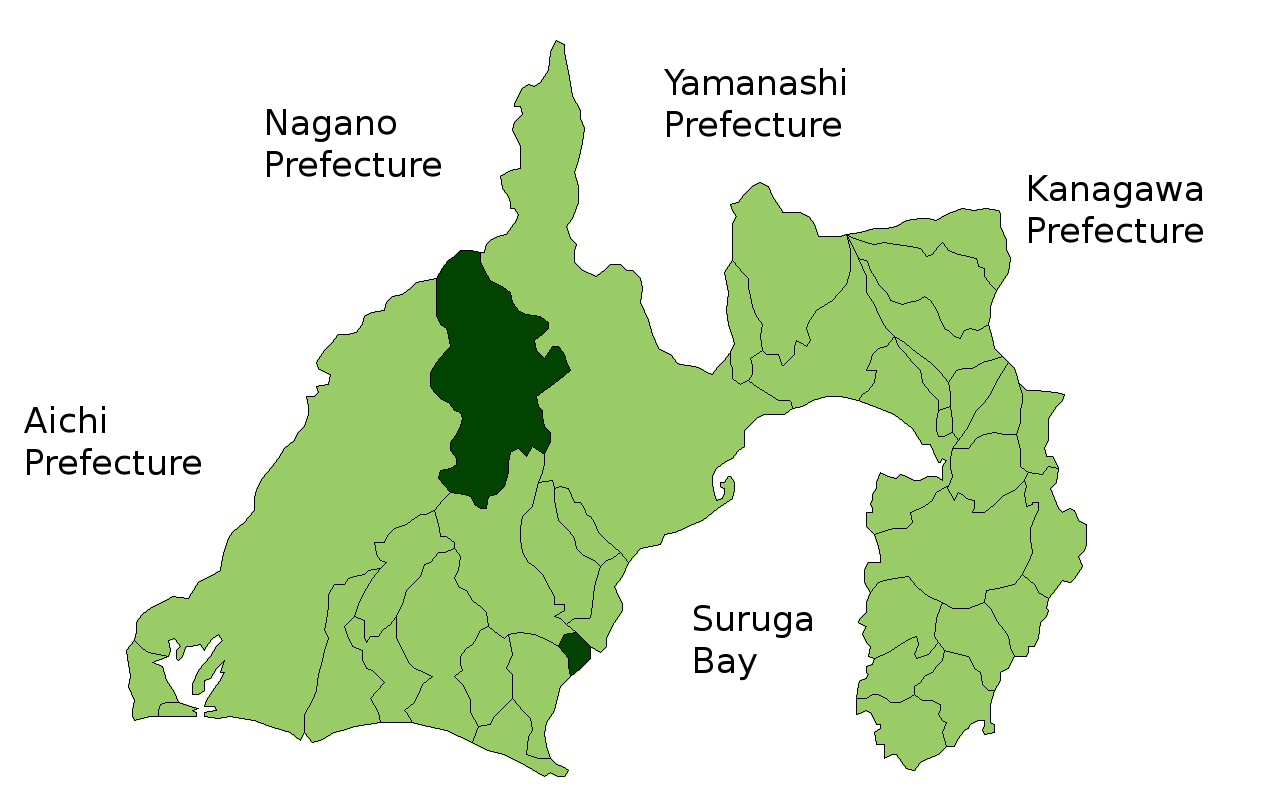
Map of Haibara District in Shizuoka Prefecture

Haibara (榛原郡, Haibara-gun) is a rural district located in Shizuoka Prefecture, Japan.

As of July 2012, the district has an estimated population of 37,550 and a population density of 72.6 persons per km^{2}. The total area was 517.56 km^{2}.

== Towns and villages ==
Haibara District current is composed of two towns. The city of Makinohara and parts of the cities of Shimada and Omaezaki were formerly part of the district.

- Yoshida
- Kawanehon

== History ==
Haibara District was established in the July 22, 1878 cadastral reforms initiated by the Meiji government with four towns (Sagara, Fukuoka, Kawasaki, Kanaya) and 73 villages. In a round of consolidation on April 1, 1889, the number of villages was reduced to 13. The village of Yoshida was elevated to town status on July 1, 1949 and Kawasaki was renamed Haibara Town on March 28, 1955. The village of Omaezaki was elevated to town status on March 21, 1955, and the town of Kawane was established on April 1, 1955, followed by Honkawne on September 30, 1956. With the elevation of Nakawane to town status on June 1, 1961, the district had eight towns and no villages.

On April 1, 2004 the town of Omaezaki merged with the town of Hamaoka from Ogasa District to create the new city of Omaezaki. On May 5, 2005 the town of Kanaya merged with the long time twin city of Shimada. On September 20, 2005 the towns of Honkawane and Nakakawane merged to form the new town of Kawanehon. On October 11, 2005 the towns of Haibara and Sagara merged to form the city of Makinohara. On April 1, 2008 the town of Kawane merged into the city of Shimada.
