= Kanaya =

Kanaya may refer to:

== People ==
- Kanaya (surname)
- Kanaya Maryam, a character from the webcomic Homestuck (2009-2016)

== Places ==
- Kanaya, Shizuoka, a former town in Shizuoka Prefecture, Japan
- Kanaya, Wakayama, a former town in Wakayama Prefecture, Japan
- Nikkō Kanaya Hotel in Tochigi Prefecture, Japan
- 5333 Kanaya, a minor planet

=== Train stations ===
- Kanaya Station, an interchange railway station in Shizuoka Prefecture, Japan
- Shin-Kanaya Station, a railway station in Shizuoka Prefecture, Japan
- Kanaya-juku, a former station of the Tōkaidō, Japan
- Hamakanaya Station in Futtsu, Chiba, Japan
