= NGC 1085 =

Galaxy in the constellation Cetus

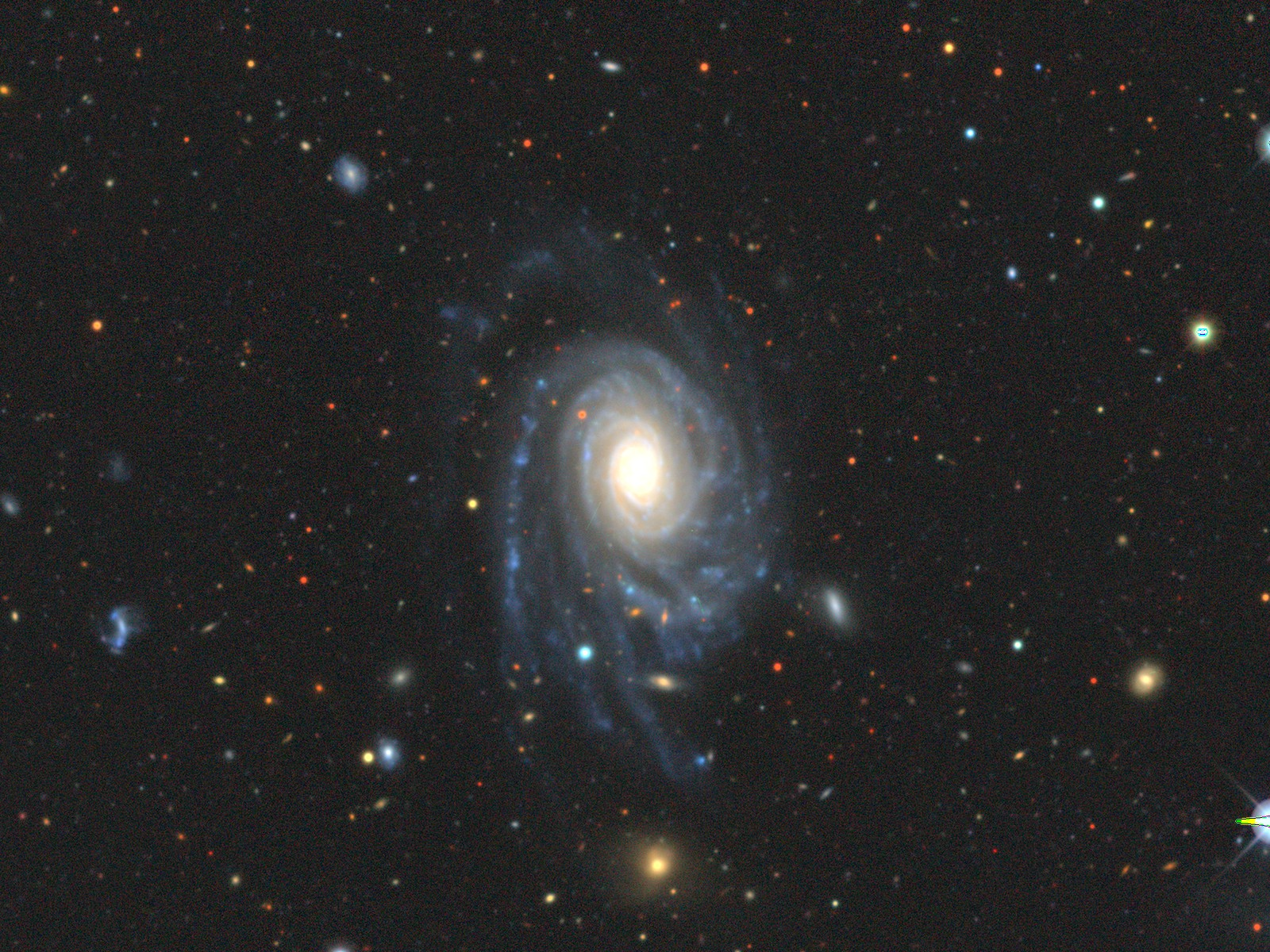
- NGC 1085 imaged by Legacy Surveys

Observation data (J2000 epoch)
- Constellation: Cetus
- Right ascension: 02^{h} 46^{m} 25.3032^{s}
- Declination: +03° 36′ 26.230″
- Redshift: 0.022649±0.000009
- Heliocentric radial velocity: 6,790±3 km/s
- Distance: 276.07 ± 12.60 Mly (84.642 ± 3.862 Mpc)
- Group or cluster: NGC 1016 group
- Apparent magnitude (V): 13.07

Characteristics
- Type: SA(s)bc
- Size: ~248,100 ly (76.08 kpc) (estimated)
- Apparent size (V): 3.0′ × 2.1′

Other designations
- IRAS 02438+0323, UGC 2241, MCG +00-08-010, PGC 10498, CGCG 389-008

NGC 1085 is a large spiral galaxy in the constellation of Cetus. Its velocity with respect to the cosmic microwave background is 6,569±16 km/s, which corresponds to a Hubble distance of 316.0 ± 22.1 Mly (96.89 ± 6.79 Mpc). Additionally, 12 non-redshift measurements give a closer mean distance of 276.07 ± 12.60 Mly (84.642 ± 3.862 Mpc). It was discovered by German astronomer Heinrich d'Arrest on 26 September 1865.

== NGC 1016 group ==
NGC 1085 is a member of the NGC 1016 galaxy group, which contains 10 members, including NGC 1004, NGC 1016, IC 232, IC 241, IC 1843, UGC 2018, UGC 2019, UGC 2024, and UGC 2051.

== Supernovae ==
Two supernovae have been observed in NGC 1085:

- SN 2003hk (Type II, mag. 17.6) was discovered by LOTOSS (Lick Observatory and Tenagra Observatory Supernova Searches), and independently by Tom Boles, on 20 August 2003.
- SN 2025ymh (Type II, mag. 19.55) was discovered by the Large Array Survey Telescope (LAST) on 24 September 2025.

== See also ==
- List of NGC objects (1001–2000)
