= 5333 Kanaya =

Main-belt asteroid

Discovery
- Discovered by: M. Akiyama; T. Furuta
- Discovery site: Mishima Obs. (886)
- Discovery date: 18 October 1990

Designations
- Named after: Kanaya, Shizuoka (Japanese city)
- Alternative designations: 1990 UH · 1974 HC_{2} 1979 SJ_{2} · 1981 EJ_{49} 1985 JE_{2}
- Minor planet category: main-belt · (inner)

Orbital characteristics
- Epoch 4 September 2017 (JD 2458000.5)
- Uncertainty parameter 0
- Observation arc: 62.62 yr (22,871 days)
- Aphelion: 2.7398 AU
- Perihelion: 1.9515 AU
- Semi-major axis: 2.3456 AU
- Eccentricity: 0.1680
- Orbital period (sidereal): 3.59 yr (1,312 days)
- Mean anomaly: 61.888°
- Mean motion: 0° 16^{m} 27.84^{s} / day
- Inclination: 10.973°
- Longitude of ascending node: 208.40°
- Argument of perihelion: 309.01°

Physical characteristics
- Dimensions: 13.35 km (calculated); 13.587±0.041 km 13.918±0.032; 14.21±0.41 km
- Synodic rotation period: 3.683±0.001 h 3.8022±0.0008 h 3.80224±0.00006 h (Note: Pravec (2010): lightcurve plot of (5333) Kanaya with a rotation period 3.80223±0.00006 hours with a brightness amplitude of 0.16 mag. Summary figures at Collaborative Asteroid Lightcurve Link (CALL)); 3.8024±0.0002 h
- Geometric albedo: 0.029±0.004; 0.0407±0.0012; 0.051±0.003; 0.057 (assumed)
- Spectral type: SMASS = Ch · C
- Absolute magnitude (H): 13.1 · 12.99±0.33

5333 Kanaya, provisional designation 1990 UH, is a carbonaceous asteroid from the inner regions of the asteroid belt, approximately 14 kilometers in diameter.

The asteroid was discovered on 18 October 1990, by Japanese astronomers Makio Akiyama and Toshimasa Furuta at Mishima Observatory (886) in Susono, Japan, and named for the Japanese city of Kanaya.

== Orbit and classification ==
Kanaya orbits the Sun in the inner main-belt at a distance of 2.0–2.7 AU once every 3 years and 7 months (1,312 days). Its orbit has an eccentricity of 0.17 and an inclination of 11° with respect to the ecliptic.

A first precovery was taken at the Goethe Link Observatory in 1954. It observation arc begins at the Chilean Cerro El Roble Station in 1974, when it was identified as 1974 HC_{2}, 16 years prior to its official discovery observation at Susono.

== Physical characteristics ==
In the SMASS classification, Kanaya is a Ch-type asteroid, a hydrated sub-type of the carbonaceous C-type asteroids.

=== Diameter and albedo ===
According to the space-based surveys carried out by the Japanese Akari satellite and NASA's Wide-field Infrared Survey Explorer with its subsequent NEOWISE mission, Kanaya measures 14.2 and 13.6 kilometers in diameter, and its surface has an albedo of 0.029 and 0.051, respectively.

The Collaborative Asteroid Lightcurve Link assumes a standard albedo for carbonaceous asteroids of 0.057 and calculates a diameter of 13.4 kilometers with an absolute magnitude of 13.1.

=== Lightcurves ===
Several rotational lightcurves of Kanaya have been obtained from photometric observations. In December 2005, a first lightcurve by astronomer David Higgins at Hunters Hill Observatory (E14), Australia, gave a rotation period of 3.8022 hours with a brightness variation of 0.22 magnitude (U=3).

In October 2010, Czech astronomer Petr Pravec obtained another well-defined period of 3.80224 hours with an amplitude of 0.16 magnitude (U=3). Other observations rendered similar periods (U=2+/3-).

== Naming ==
This minor planet was named for the Japanese town of Kanaya (金谷町 Kanaya-chō) in Haibara District of the Shizuoka Prefecture. It is the native town of the first discoverer, Makio Akiyama, and also a station on the ancient "Tokai-do" road. The Malinohara plateau south of Kanaya is well known for its production of green tea. The official naming citation was published by the Minor Planet Center on 6 February 1993 (M.P.C. 21610).
