= Makio Akiyama =

Japanese astronomer

Asteroids discovered: 16
5333 Kanaya	18 October 1990	list^{[A]}
5334 Mishima	8 February 1991	list^{[A]}
5743 Kato	19 October 1990	list^{[A]}
6251 Setsuko	25 February 1992	list^{[A]}
6419 Susono	7 December 1993	list^{[A]}
6792 Akiyamatakashi	30 November 1991	list^{[A]}
6961 Ashitaka	26 May 1989	list^{[A]}
7472 Kumakiri	13 February 1992	list^{[A]}
8273 Apatheia	29 November 1989	list^{[A]}
9033 Kawane	4 January 1990	list^{[A]}
28004 Terakawa	2 December 1997	list
29624 Sugiyama	2 October 1998	list
35441 Kyoko	31 January 1998	list
40994 Tekaridake	20 October 1999	list
53157 Akaishidake	5 February 1999	list
55873 Shiomidake	26 October 1997	list
^{A} co-discovered with Toshimasa Furuta

Makio Akiyama (秋山 万喜夫, Akiyama Makio; born 1950) is a Japanese astronomer affiliated with the Susono Observatory (886). He is a discoverer of minor planets, credited by the Minor Planet Center with the discovery of 16 numbered minor planets during 1989–1999.

In 1992 he discovered the asteroid 6251 Setsuko in collaboration with astronomer Toshimasa Furuta, and named it after his wife Setsuko Akiyama (born 1953) in May 1996 (M.P.C. 27129).

The main-belt asteroid 4904 Makio, discovered by Yoshikane Mizuno and Toshimasa Furuta at Kani Observatory (403) in 1989, is named after him. Naming citation was published on 5 March 1996 (M.P.C. 26763).
