= 7648 Tomboles =

Main-belt asteroid

Discovery
- Discovered by: Y. Mizuno; T. Furuta
- Discovery site: Kani Obs.
- Discovery date: 8 October 1989

Designations
- Named after: Tom Boles (Scottish astronomer)
- Alternative designations: 1989 TB_{1} · 1981 CE; 1984 BK_{1} · 1986 WD_{10}
- Minor planet category: main-belt · (inner) background

Orbital characteristics
- Epoch 23 March 2018 (JD 2458200.5)
- Uncertainty parameter 0
- Observation arc: 36.42 yr (13,301 d)
- Aphelion: 2.3980 AU
- Perihelion: 1.9152 AU
- Semi-major axis: 2.1566 AU
- Eccentricity: 0.1119
- Orbital period (sidereal): 3.17 yr (1,157 d)
- Mean anomaly: 316.41°
- Mean motion: 0° 18^{m} 40.32^{s} / day
- Inclination: 2.7210°
- Longitude of ascending node: 11.756°
- Argument of perihelion: 53.726°

Physical characteristics
- Mean diameter: 3.914±0.123 km
- Geometric albedo: 0.200±0.027
- Absolute magnitude (H): 14.3

7648 Tomboles, provisional designation 1989 TB_{1}, is a background asteroid from the inner regions of the asteroid belt, approximately 4 kilometers (2.5 miles) in diameter. It was discovered on 8 October 1989, by Japanese astronomers Yoshikane Mizuno and Toshimasa Furuta at the Kani Observatory in Kani, Japan. The asteroid was named after Scottish amateur astronomer Tom Boles.

== Orbit and classification ==
Tomboles is a non-family asteroid from the main belt's background population. It orbits the Sun in the inner main-belt at a distance of 1.9–2.4 AU once every 3 years and 2 months (1,157 days; semi-major axis of 2.16 AU). Its orbit has an eccentricity of 0.11 and an inclination of 3° with respect to the ecliptic.

The body's observation arc begins with its first observation as 1981 CE at the Klet Observatory in February 1981.

== Physical characteristics ==
Tomboles has an absolute magnitude of 14.3. While its spectral type is unknown, it is likely a stony S-type asteroid based on the albedo (see below) derived from observations with the Wide-field Infrared Survey Explorer (WISE). As of 2018, no rotational lightcurve of this asteroid has been obtained from photometric observations. The body's rotation period, pole and shape remain unknown.

=== Diameter and albedo ===
According to the survey carried out by the NEOWISE mission of NASA's WISE telescope, Tomboles measures 3.91 kilometers in diameter and its surface has an albedo of 0.20.

== Naming ==
This minor planet was named after Scottish amateur astronomer Tom Boles (born 1944) a discoverer of a minor planet (also see 84417 Ritabo) and a record-number of supernovae, using a robotic telescope at Coddenham Observatory (234) in Coddenham, Suffolk, in eastern England. Boles has been the President of the British Astronomical Association from 2003 to 2005.

The official naming citation was published by the Minor Planet Center on 13 November 2008 (M.P.C. 64311).
