= 2478 Tokai =

Stony Florian asteroid and binary system

Discovery
- Discovered by: T. Furuta
- Discovery site: Tōkai Obs. (879)
- Discovery date: 4 May 1981

Designations
- Pronunciation: /ˈtoʊkaɪ/ Japanese: [toːkai]
- Named after: Tōkai (Japanese city)
- Alternative designations: 1981 JC · 1931 HH; 1932 SE · 1934 ED; 1939 VH · 1951 JP; 1955 OE · 1955 QV; 1957 BD · 1972 RS; 1978 NU_{2} · 1979 XR; 1981 JT
- Minor planet category: main-belt · Flora

Orbital characteristics
- Epoch 4 September 2017 (JD 2458000.5)
- Uncertainty parameter 0
- Observation arc: 84.68 yr (30,929 days)
- Aphelion: 2.3781 AU
- Perihelion: 2.0740 AU
- Semi-major axis: 2.2261 AU
- Eccentricity: 0.0683
- Orbital period (sidereal): 3.32 yr (1,213 days)
- Mean anomaly: 103.28°
- Mean motion: 0° 17^{m} 48.48^{s} / day
- Inclination: 4.1389°
- Longitude of ascending node: 228.80°
- Argument of perihelion: 233.85°
- Known satellites: 1

Physical characteristics
- Dimensions: 9.238±0.112 km 9.36±1.51 km 9.71±0.49 km 9.982±0.031 km 10.087 km 10.09 km (taken)
- Synodic rotation period: 25.88±0.01 h (Note: Oey (2011) web: rotation period 25.88 hours with a brightness amplitude of mag. Summary figures for (2478) Tokai at Collaborative Asteroid Lightcurve Link (CALL)); 25.885±0.007 h 25.8913 h (Note: Pravec (2007) web: rotation period 25.8913 hours with a brightness amplitude of 0.41 mag. Q=3. Summary figures for (2478) Tokai at Collaborative Asteroid Lightcurve Link (CALL)); 25.97±0.11 h
- Geometric albedo: 0.144±0.015; 0.1957; 0.2084±0.0371; 0.252±0.045; 0.33±0.20
- Spectral type: SMASS = S · S
- Absolute magnitude (H): 11.88±0.03 (R) · 12.00 · 12.15±0.04 · 12.2 · 12.33 · 12.37±0.058 · 12.80

2478 Tokai, provisionally designated 1981 JC, is a stony Florian asteroid and binary system from the inner regions of the asteroid belt, approximately 10 kilometers in diameter. It was discovered on 4 May 1981, by Japanese astronomer Toshimasa Furuta at Tōkai Observatory (879), Japan. The asteroid was named after the city of Tōkai.

== Orbit and classification ==
Tokai is a member of the Flora family, one of the largest groups of stony asteroids in the main-belt. It orbits the Sun in the inner main-belt at a distance of 2.1–2.4 AU once every 3 years and 4 months (1,213 days). Its orbit has an eccentricity of 0.07 and an inclination of 4° with respect to the ecliptic.

== Physical characteristics ==
In the SMASS classification, Tokai is a common S-type asteroid.

=== Diameter and albedo ===
According to the surveys carried out by the Japanese Akari satellite, and NASA's Wide-field Infrared Survey Explorer (WISE) with its subsequent NEOWISE mission, Tokai measures between 9.238 and 9.982 kilometers in diameter and its surface has an albedo between 0.144 and 0.33. The Collaborative Asteroid Lightcurve Link agrees with Petr Pravec's revised WISE-data, that is, an albedo of 0.1957 and a diameter of 10.09 kilometers with an absolute magnitude of 12.37.

=== Satellite ===
Photometric observations in 2007, revealed a minor-planet moon in orbit of Tokai. It measures approximately 6 kilometers in diameter (lower limit diameter ratio of 0.72) and has an orbital period of 25.88 hours.

== Naming ==
This minor planet was named after the city of Tōkai, Japan, where the discoverer lives and the discovering observatory is located. The approved naming citation was published by the Minor Planet Center on 8 February 1982 (M.P.C. 6650).
