= NGC 6365 =

Galaxy pair in the constellation Draco

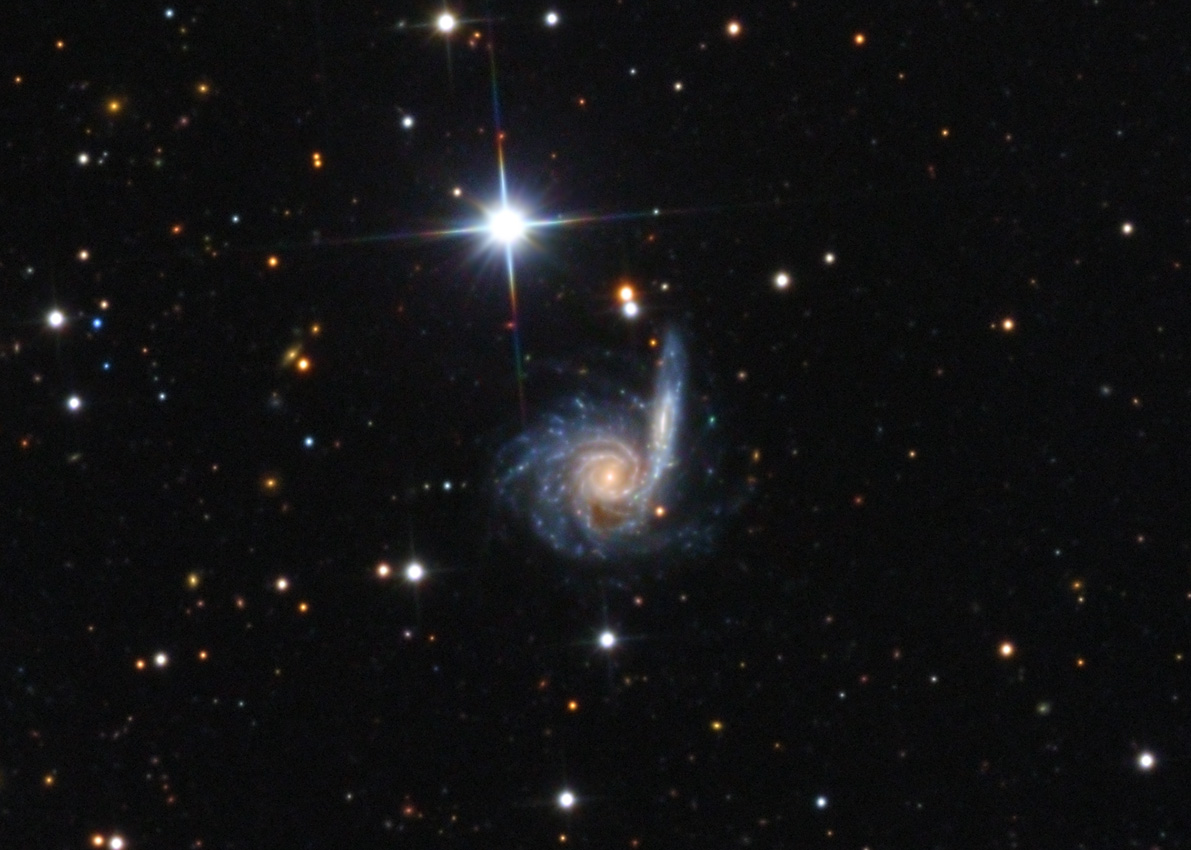

Observation data
- Constellation: Draco
- Right ascension: 17h 22m 43.7s
- Declination: 62° 10′ 12″
- Apparent magnitude (V): 13.9 and 14.2
- Apparent magnitude (B): 14.6 and 14,8
- Surface brightness: 14.00 and 12.56 mag/am^{2}

Characteristics
- Type: Interacting galaxies

Other designations
- CGCG 300-20 VV 232 Arp 30 NGC 6365A PGC 60174 UGC 10832 MCG 10-25-19 KCPG 511A NGC 6365B PGC 60171 CGCG 10833 MCG 10-25-18 KCPG 511B IRAS 17222+6212

NGC 6365 is a pair of spiral galaxies in the constellation Draco. It consists of two galaxies, PGC 60174 to the south, and PGC 60171 to the north. These two galaxies are also designated respectively by the NASA/IPAC database as NGC 6365A and NGC 6365B. This pair of galaxies was discovered by German astronomer Lewis Swift in 1884.

== NGC 6563A ==
NGC 6563A is the northern counterpart of NGC 6563, and is a barred spiral galaxy. Its coordinates are 17h 22m 43.8s and 62° 09′ 57.9″. Its speed relative to the cosmic microwave background is 8,413 ± 4 km/s, which corresponds to a Hubble distance of 124.1 ± 8.7 Mpc (~405 million ly).

The luminosity class of NGC 6365A is III-IV and it has a broad HI line. It is an active galaxy (AGN) of type Seyfert 2.

With a surface brightness equal to 14.00 mag/am^2, we can qualify NGC 6365A as a low surface brightness galaxy (LSB). LSB galaxies are diffuse (D) galaxies with a surface brightness less than one magnitude lower than that of the ambient night sky.

To date, nearly fifteen measurements not based on redshift give a distance of 111.469 ± 31.088 Mpc (~364 million ly), which is within the values of the Hubble distance.

=== Supernovae ===
Three supernovae have been observed in NGC 6365A:

- SN 2003U (Type Ia, mag. 18.0) was discovered by Scottish astronomer Tom Boles on 27 January 2003.
- SN 2016ino (Type Ic-BL, mag. 17.8) was discovered by Ron Arbour on 26 November 2016.
- SN 2020qim (Type II, mag. 18.6) was discovered by GOTO on 26 July 2020.

== NGC 6563B ==
NGC is the southern counterpart of NGC 6563, and is a spiral galaxy. However, the NASA/IPAC database indicates that it is Magellanic in type. Its coordinates are 17h 22m 43.5s and 62° 10′ 25.4″. Its speed relative to the cosmic microwave background is 7,975 ± 4 km/s, which corresponds to a Hubble distance of 117.6 ± 8.2 Mpc (~384 million ly). The luminosity class of NGC 6365B is IV-V and it has a broad HI line. It also contains regions of ionized hydrogen.

== Galaxy interaction ==
The pair of galaxies that make up NGC 6563 appear in Halton Arp's Atlas of Peculiar Galaxies under the designation Arp 30. Arp describes NGC 6365 as a spiral galaxy with an overdeveloped arm, but this has been recently confirmed by astronomers to be false. In the image used by Arp, PGC 60171 (NGC 6365B) appears to be part of PGC 60174 and to be one galaxy. But, they are actually two separate galaxies. According to redshift-based measurements, NGC 6365A is the most distant galaxy. However, given the uncertainties in the measurements, NGC 6365B could be the most distant galaxy. The image taken by the telescope at the Mount Lemmon observatory does not allow us to decide. There is no publication that is only speculative about their position and also about their interaction.

== See also ==
- List of NGC objects (6001–7000)
- Atlas of Peculiar Galaxies
- Lists of galaxies
- List of supernovae
