= (10537) 1991 RY16 =

Main belt asteroid

(10537) 1991 RY_{16}
Discovery
- Discovered by: Henry E. Holt
- Discovery site: Palomar Observatory
- Discovery date: 15 September 1991

Designations
- Alternative designations: 1982 XP_{1} · 1990 LF
- Minor planet category: Main belt

Orbital characteristics
- Epoch 21 November 2025 (JD 2461000.5)
- Uncertainty parameter 0
- Aphelion: 3.04867 AU
- Perihelion: 2.64575 AU
- Semi-major axis: 2.84721 AU
- Eccentricity: 0.070756
- Orbital period (sidereal): 4.80438 y (1754.80 d)
- Mean anomaly: 167.329°
- Mean motion: 0.205152° / d
- Inclination: 7.26027°
- Longitude of ascending node: 62.4603°
- Argument of perihelion: 162.669°
- Earth MOID: 1.63537 AU
- Jupiter MOID: 1.92981 AU
- T_{Jupiter}: 3.291

Physical characteristics
- Mean diameter: 7.865±0.269 km
- Sidereal rotation period: 5.5512 h
- Geometric albedo: 0.313±0.053
- Spectral type: V-type or R-type?
- Absolute magnitude (H): 12.83

(10537) 1991 RY_{16} is an unnamed asteroid located in the main asteroid belt. It was discovered by astronomer Henry E. Holt at Palomar Observatory on 15 September 1991. It has an uncertain surface mineralogy, with indications that it may be basaltic in composition and thus came from a destroyed differentiated object. Despite this, it has not been confirmed to be a member of any known asteroid family or group, possibly due to past orbital migration.

== History ==
1991 RY_{16} was first reported to the Minor Planet Center (MPC) by Kiso Observatory, an observatory operated by the University of Tokyo on Mount Ontake, Japan. It was observed on 13 and 14 December 1982, after which it was given the provisional designation 1982 XP_{1} by the MPC in 1983. The asteroid then became lost, not being observed again until 14 June 1990 by Siding Spring Observatory in New South Wales, Australia. Since it was not recognized as the same asteroid, the MPC provisionally designated it 1990 LF. It was again observed on 15 and 17 September 1991 by astronomer Henry E. Holt at Palomar Observatory in California, United States. Reported as a new asteroid, its 1991 observations were given the provisional designation 1991 RY_{16}.

By June 1992, the asteroid's 1982 and 1991 observations were linked together, and its 1990 observation was linked a year later in June 1993. Once the asteroid was sufficiently observed, the MPC numbered it (10537) and assigned 1991 RY_{16} as its primary provisional designation on 4 May 1999. As of 2025, it has yet to be given a name.

== Orbit ==
1991 RY_{16} orbits the Sun at an average distance—its semi-major axis—of 2.85 astronomical units (AU), placing it in the outer main belt and exterior to the 3:1 mean-motion resonance with Jupiter at 2.5 AU. It takes 4.8 years to complete one orbit, and it has an orbital inclination of 7.26° with respect to the ecliptic plane. Along its orbit, its distance from the Sun varies between 2.65 AU at perihelion to 3.05 AU at aphelion due to its orbital eccentricity of 0.07.

1991 RY_{16} does not belong to any known asteroid family, despite its spectral characteristics indicating that it is a fragment of a larger parent asteroid. N-body simulations show that its orbit is currently stable and non-resonant, though it lies near two nonlinear secular resonances that have influenced its past orbital migration. Destabilizing mean-motion resonances with Jupiter, such as the 5:2 resonance and the 7:3 resonance, limit how far 1991 RY_{16} could have migrated. The upper limit of Yarkovsky effect migration is ~0.1 AU, further constraining where 1991 RY_{16} could have originated from.

== Physical characteristics ==
1991 RY_{16} has an estimated diameter of 7.865 kilometres (4.887 mi), with an uncertainty of 0.269 kilometres (0.167 mi). Observations of its lightcurve, or variations in its observed brightness, by the Transiting Exoplanet Survey Satellite (TESS) suggests that it has a rotation period of 5.55 hours.

1991 RY_{16} is an asteroid with an ambiguous mineralogy, receiving conflicting assignments as either a V-type asteroid or an R-type asteroid. Its near-infrared spectral features do not match those of V-type asteroids 1459 Magnya and 4 Vesta or R-type asteroid 349 Dembowska, though it shows stronger similarities to the latter. In the 1 and 2 μm absorption bands, it lies between the mineralogies of ordinary chondrites and basaltic achondrites, indicating that it originated from a differentiated parent body. It also lies above the olivine–orthopyroxene mixing line, suggesting that its surface is composed of low- and high-Ca pyroxene and olivine. 1991 RY_{16} shows an unusually deep absorption at 0.63 μm, which may be caused by the presence of contaminating cations such as Mn^{2+}, Cr^{3+}, and Fe^{3+}. Though its mineralogy and location in the asteroid belt restrict where it could have come from, a possible parent body is Dembowska. Dembowska is a 140 km (87 mi) sized asteroid that also has an uncertain surface mineralogy, and past studies have suggested that it may have experienced igneous processes in the past. However, Dembowska is not known for certain to be related to 1991 RY_{16}.

== See also ==
- 7472 Kumakiri – a spectrally similar asteroid
