= NGC 1589 =

Galaxy in the constellation Taurus

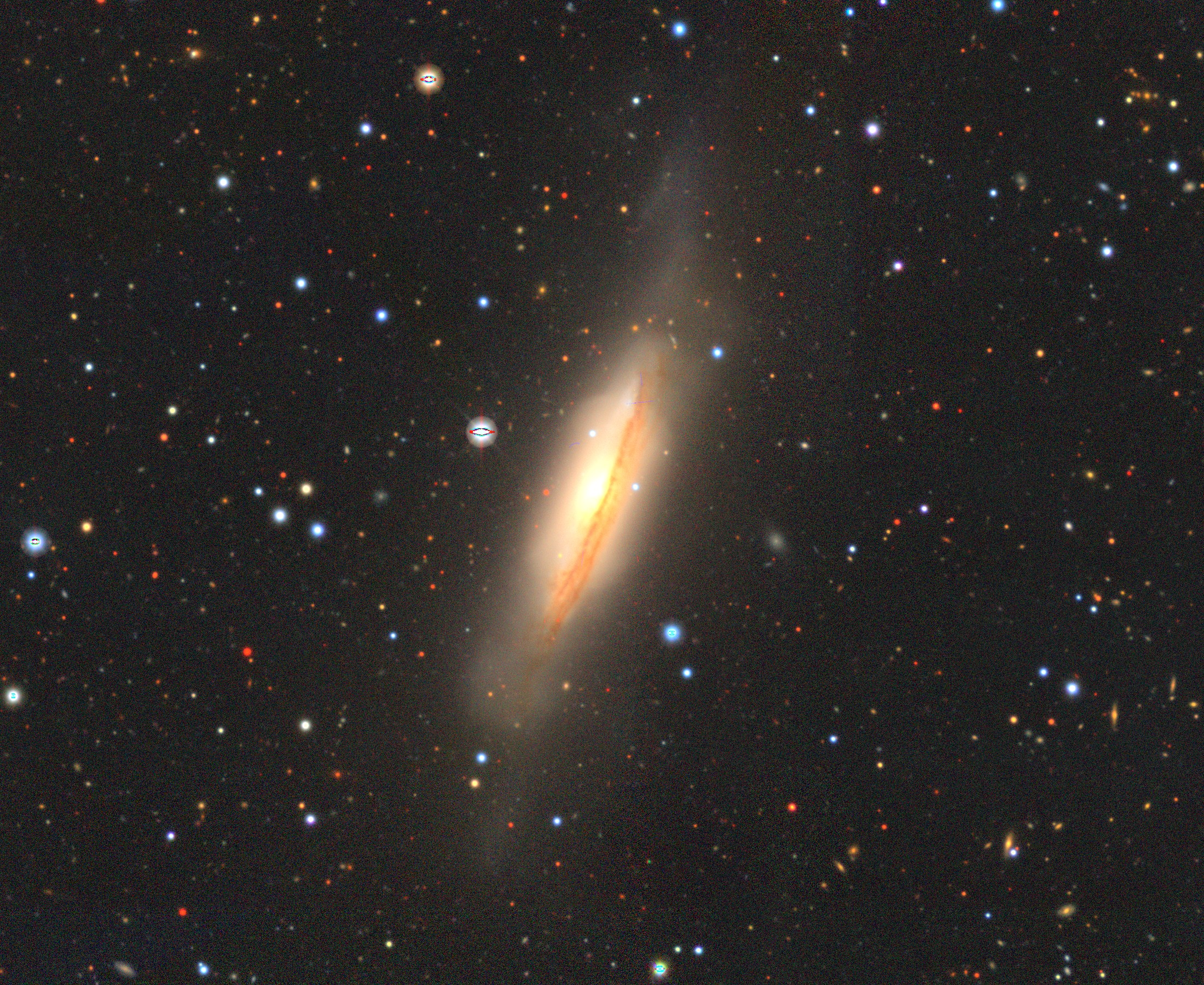
- NGC 1589 imaged by Legacy Surveys

Observation data (J2000 epoch)
- Constellation: Taurus
- Right ascension: 04^{h} 30^{m} 45.4410^{s}
- Declination: +00° 51′ 49.102″
- Redshift: 0.012662±0.0000240
- Heliocentric radial velocity: 3,796±7 km/s
- Distance: 154.38 ± 1.90 Mly (47.333 ± 0.584 Mpc)
- Group or cluster: NGC 1589 group (LGG 117)
- Apparent magnitude (V): 12.80

Characteristics
- Type: Sab
- Size: ~166,100 ly (50.94 kpc) (estimated)
- Apparent size (V): 3.2′ × 1.0′

Other designations
- 2MASS J04304544+0051493, UGC 3065, MCG +00-12-038, PGC 15342, CGCG 393-030

NGC 1589 is a large spiral galaxy in the constellation of Taurus. Its velocity with respect to the cosmic microwave background is 3,729±9 km/s, which corresponds to a Hubble distance of 179.4 ± 12.6 Mly (55.00 ± 3.85 Mpc). However, three non-redshift measurements give a closer mean distance of 154.38 ± 1.90 Mly (47.333 ± 0.584 Mpc). It was discovered by German-British astronomer William Herschel on 19 December 1783.

== NGC 1589 group ==
NGC 1589 is the largest galaxy in a group of galaxies named after it. The NGC 1589 group (also known as LGG 117) has nine galaxies, including NGC 1586, NGC 1587, NGC 1588, NGC 1620, UGC 3054, UGC 3058, UGC 3072 and UGC 3080.

== Supernova ==
One supernova has been observed in NGC 1589: SN 2001eb (Type Ia, mag. 16.3) was discovered by Tom Boles on 29 August 2001.

== Image gallery ==
NGC 1589 imaged by the Hubble Space Telescope

== See also ==
- List of NGC objects (1001–2000)
