= 4265 Kani =

Main-belt asteroid

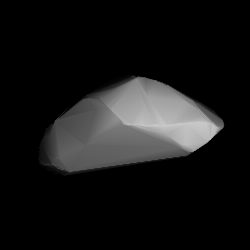
- Shape model of Kani from its lightcurve

Discovery
- Discovered by: Y. Mizuno; T. Furuta
- Discovery site: Kani Obs. (403)
- Discovery date: 8 October 1989

Designations
- Named after: Kani (Japanese city)
- Alternative designations: 1989 TX · 1940 WM; 1955 VJ · 1974 VH_{2} 1983 AP_{1} · A917 TB
- Minor planet category: main-belt · (inner)

Orbital characteristics
- Epoch 4 September 2017 (JD 2458000.5)
- Uncertainty parameter 0
- Observation arc: 76.33 yr (27,880 days)
- Aphelion: 2.9147 AU
- Perihelion: 1.9407 AU
- Semi-major axis: 2.4277 AU
- Eccentricity: 0.2006
- Orbital period (sidereal): 3.78 yr (1,382 days)
- Mean anomaly: 140.60°
- Mean motion: 0° 15^{m} 38.16^{s} / day
- Inclination: 4.3567°
- Longitude of ascending node: 127.25°
- Argument of perihelion: 242.75°

Physical characteristics
- Mean diameter: 14.244±0.160 km 15.74±0.76 km
- Synodic rotation period: 5.72755±0.00005 h 5.727574±0.000001 h 5.7279±0.0001 h (Note: Pravec (2008): lightcurve plot for (4265) Kani, with a rotation period 5.7279±0.0001 hours with a brightness amplitude of 0.75 mag. Summary figures at Collaborative Asteroid Lightcurve Link (CALL)); 5.7285±0.0011 h
- Geometric albedo: 0.054±0.006; 0.056±0.007; 0.0565±0.0074
- Spectral type: SMASS = C
- Absolute magnitude (H): 12.8 · 12.940±0.006 (R) · 13.0

4265 Kani (prov. designation: 1989 TX) is a dark background asteroid from the inner regions of the asteroid belt. It was discovered by Japanese astronomers Yoshikane Mizuno and Toshimasa Furuta at Kani Observatory (403) on 8 October 1989. The carbonaceous C-type asteroid has a rotation period of 5.7 hours and measures approximately 14 kilometers (9 miles) in diameter. It was named for the Japanese city of Kani.

== Orbit and classification ==
Kani is a non-family asteroid of the main belt's background population when applying the hierarchical clustering method to its proper orbital elements. It orbits the Sun in the inner main-belt at a distance of 1.9–2.9 AU once every 3 years and 9 months (1,382 days). Its orbit has an eccentricity of 0.20 and an inclination of 4° with respect to the ecliptic. The body's first observation at Crimea-Simeis dates back to 1917, while the first used observation was made at Turku in 1940, extending the asteroid's observation arc by 49 years prior to its discovery.

== Naming ==
This minor planet was named for the Japanese city of Kani, home of the discoverer, located in the countryside of Japan's Gifu Prefecture, approximately 30 kilometers north of Nagoya, the country's third largest city. Kani is situated on the Kiso riverside, which is referred to as the Japan Rhine because of its similarities to the Rhine in Europe. The official naming citation was published by the Minor Planet Center on 11 March 1990 (M.P.C. 16045).

== Physical characteristics ==
In the Bus–Binzel SMASS classification, Kani is characterized as a common, carbonaceous C-type asteroid.

=== Rotation period ===
In October 2008, two rotational lightcurves of this asteroid were obtained from photometric observations made at the Golden Hill Observatory in Stourton Caundle and the Palmer Divide Observatory in Colorado Springs, Colorado. The lightcurves gave an identical rotation period of 5.7279±0.0001 hours and a brightness variation of 0.75 ± 0.02 in magnitude (U=3/3). Observations at the Palomar Transient Factory and revised shape-models have since confirmed the body's rotation period.

=== Diameter and albedo ===
According to the space-based surveys carried out by the Japanese Akari satellite and the NEOWISE mission of NASA's Wide-field Infrared Survey Explorer, the asteroid measures 15.7 and 14.2 kilometers in diameter, respectively. Conversely, the Collaborative Asteroid Lightcurve Link calculates a diameter of only 7.5 kilometers, due to an assumed albedo of 0.20, which is untypically high for a carbonaceous asteroid.
