= 4904 Makio =

Main-belt asteroid

Discovery
- Discovered by: Y. Mizuno; T. Furuta
- Discovery site: Kani Obs. (403)
- Discovery date: 21 November 1989

Designations
- Named after: Makio Akiyama (Japanese astronomer)
- Alternative designations: 1989 WZ · 1974 TB; 1974 WC · 1980 KF_{2}
- Minor planet category: main-belt · (inner)

Orbital characteristics
- Epoch 4 September 2017 (JD 2458000.5)
- Uncertainty parameter 0
- Observation arc: 42.65 yr (15,578 days)
- Aphelion: 2.6986 AU
- Perihelion: 2.0785 AU
- Semi-major axis: 2.3886 AU
- Eccentricity: 0.1298
- Orbital period (sidereal): 3.69 yr (1,348 days)
- Mean anomaly: 129.31°
- Mean motion: 0° 16^{m} 1.2^{s} / day
- Inclination: 10.122°
- Longitude of ascending node: 228.94°
- Argument of perihelion: 266.59°

Physical characteristics
- Dimensions: 6.992±0.044 km 9.40 km (calculated)
- Synodic rotation period: 7.830±0.003 h
- Geometric albedo: 0.20 (assumed); 0.329±0.033; 0.3295±0.0326
- Spectral type: S
- Absolute magnitude (H): 12.5 · 12.6 · 12.70±0.57

4904 Makio, provisional designation 1989 WZ, is a stony asteroid from the inner regions of the asteroid belt, approximately 8 kilometers in diameter. It was discovered by Japanese astronomers Yoshikane Mizuno and Toshimasa Furuta at Kani Observatory (403) on 21 November 1989. It was named after Japanese astronomer Makio Akiyama.

== Orbit and classification ==
Makio orbits the Sun in the inner main-belt at a distance of 2.1–2.7 AU once every 3 years and 8 months (1,348 days). Its orbit has an eccentricity of 0.13 and an inclination of 10° with respect to the ecliptic.

It was first identified as 1974 TB at the Chilean Cerro El Roble Station in 1974, extending the body's observation arc by 15 years prior to its discovery.

== Physical characteristics ==
Makio has been characterized as a common S-type asteroid.

=== Rotation period ===
A rotational lightcurve of Makio was obtained from photometric observations made by Julian Oey at the Australian Kingsgrove Observatory (E19) in March 2009. Lightcurve analysis gave a rotation period of 7.830 hours with a small brightness variation of 0.08 magnitude, indicative of a spheroidal shape (U=2).

=== Diameter and albedo ===
According to the survey carried out by the NEOWISE mission of NASA's Wide-field Infrared Survey Explorer, Makio measures 7.0 kilometers in diameter and its surface has an albedo of 0.33, while the Collaborative Asteroid Lightcurve Link assumes a standard albedo for stony asteroids of 0.20 and calculates a diameter of 9.4 kilometers with an absolute magnitude of 12.5.

== Naming ==
This minor planet was named after Japanese astronomer Makio Akiyama (born 1950), an observer and discoverer of minor planets himself at the Susono Observatory (886). The official naming citation was published by the Minor Planet Center on 5 March 1996 (M.P.C. 26763).
