= 4951 Iwamoto =

Stony binary asteroid and slow rotator from the inner regions of the asteroid belt

Discovery
- Discovered by: Y. Mizuno; T. Furuta
- Discovery site: Kani Obs. (403)
- Discovery date: 21 January 1990

Designations
- Named after: Masayuki Iwamoto (Japanese astronomer)
- Alternative designations: 1990 BM · 1931 UQ; 1985 QN_{6} · 1985 RH_{5} 1989 WS_{3}
- Minor planet category: main-belt · (inner)

Orbital characteristics
- Epoch 4 September 2017 (JD 2458000.5)
- Uncertainty parameter 0
- Observation arc: 85.45 yr (31,210 days)
- Aphelion: 2.6318 AU
- Perihelion: 1.8824 AU
- Semi-major axis: 2.2571 AU
- Eccentricity: 0.1660
- Orbital period (sidereal): 3.39 yr (1,239 days)
- Mean anomaly: 79.093°
- Mean motion: 0° 17^{m} 26.52^{s} / day
- Inclination: 7.5269°
- Longitude of ascending node: 101.08°
- Argument of perihelion: 339.95°
- Known satellites: 1 (Note: Central Bureau for Astronomical Telegrams IAUC 8836 – (4951) Iwamoto Photometric observations from 25 December 2006 to 23 March 2007, revealed that (4951) Iwamoto is a synchronous binary asteroid with a rotation period of 118.0±0.2 hours. The combined rotational lightcurve has a brightness variation of 0.34 magnitude. Superimposed mutual occultation/eclipsing events indicate a lower D_{s}/D_{p} limit of 0.76. It has an estimated mean abs. magnitude of 13.26±0.05 (Cousins R system), and a measured V–R color index of 0.48±0.03, giving an absolute visual magnitude of 13.74±0.06. This gives a mean-diameter of 4.0 and 3.5 kilometers (±20%) for the primary and secondary, respectively, assuming a geometric visual albedo of 0.20±0.07 the S-type classified body in the SMASS II taxonomy. The system's parameters are extraordinary in comparison with other known small binaries, in terms of system angular momentum and evolution to its present synchronous state; thus, further observations are warranted. Reported by: Vishnu Reddy at the Department of Earth System Science and Policy, University of North Dakota; Ron Dyvig, Badlands Observatory, Sorth Dakota, USA; Petr Pravec and Peter Kušnirák at Ondřejov Observatory Czech Republic; Adrián Galád, Leonard Kornoš, Štefan Gajdoš, and Jozef Világi at Modra Observatory, Slovakia; Donald Pray, Carbuncle Hill Observatory, Rhode Island, USA; Walter R. Cooney Jr., John Gross and Dirk Terrell at Sonoita Research Observatory (G94), Arizona, USA; Yuri N. Krugly, Kharkiv Observatory, Ukraine; Judit Györgyey Ries, McDonald Observatory, Texas, USA; Ken Archer, Ironwood Observatory, Hawaii, USA; Julian Oey, Leura Observatory, Australia; Michal Pikler and Marek Husarik, Skalnaté pleso Observatory, Slovakia; Russell Durkee, Shed of Science Observatory (H39), Minneapolis, USA; François Colas at Pic du Midi Observatory, France; Alan W. Harris, Space Science Institute in La Canada, California, USA) (≥ 0.76 D_{s}/D_{p}; P: 118 h)

Physical characteristics
- Dimensions: 4.39±0.02 km 5.192±0.043 km 5.515±0.033 km 5.528 km (revised WISE); 5.53 km (taken)
- Synodic rotation period: 118 h 118.0±0.2 h (Note: Pravec (2007) web: rotation period 118.0±0.2 hours with a brightness amplitude of 0.34 mag. Quality code = 3. Summary figures at Collaborative Asteroid Lightcurve Link (CALL) and Pravec, P.; Wolf, M.; Sarounova, L. (2007))
- Geometric albedo: 0.1844 (revised WISE); 0.1859±0.0324; 0.218±0.038
- Spectral type: SMASS = S · S V–R = 0.480±0.030
- Absolute magnitude (H): 13.3 · 13.74±0.06 · 13.74 · 14.01±1.40

4951 Iwamoto, provisional designation 1990 BM, is a stony, synchronous binary asteroid and slow rotator from the inner regions of the asteroid belt, approximately 5.5 kilometers in diameter. It was discovered on 21 January 1990, by Japanese astronomers Yoshikane Mizuno and Toshimasa Furuta at Kani Observatory (403) in Japan.

== Orbit ==
Animation of 4951 Iwamoto's orbit Sun · Earth · Mars · 4951 Iwamoto

Iwamoto orbits the Sun in the inner main-belt at a distance of 1.9–2.6 AU once every 3 years and 5 months (1,239 days). Its orbit has an eccentricity of 0.17 and an inclination of 8° with respect to the ecliptic. It was first identified as 1931 UQ at Lowell Observatory in 1931, extending the body's observation arc by 59 years prior to its official discovery observation at Kani.

== Physical characteristics ==
In the SMASS classification, Iwamoto is a common S-type asteroid.

=== Diameter and albedo ===
According to the survey carried out by NASA's Wide-field Infrared Survey Explorer with its subsequent NEOWISE mission, Iwamoto measures 5.192 and 5.515 kilometers in diameter, and its surface has an albedo of 0.218 and 0.186, respectively. The Collaborative Asteroid Lightcurve Link adopts Petr Pravec's revised WISE-data, that is, an albedo of 0.1844 and a diameter of 5.528 kilometers with on an absolute magnitude of 13.74.

=== Slow rotator ===
From 25 December 2006 to 23 March 2007, photometric observations of Iwamoto were obtained by the international community of photometrists at Badlands Observatory (SD, USA), Ondřejov Observatory (Czech Republic), Modra Observatory (Slovakia), Carbuncle Hill Observatory (RI, USA), Sonoita Research Observatory (AZ, USA), Kharkiv Observatory (Ukraine), McDonald Observatory (TX, USA), Ironwood Observatory (HI, USA), Leura Observatory (Australia), Skalnaté pleso Observatory (Slovakia), Shed of Science Observatory (MN, USA), Pic du Midi Observatory (France).

Lightcurve analysis gave a rotation period of 118 hours with a brightness variation of 0.34 magnitude (U=3). In May 2011, astronomers Etienne Morelle, Raoul Behrend obtained another lightcurve with a concurring period of 118 hours and an amplitude of 0.38 magnitude.(U=3). With such a long period, Iwamoto is also a slow rotator, as the vast majority of asteroids have a much shorter rotation period of 2.2 to 20 hours.

=== Binary system ===
During the photometric observations in 2006/7, it was revealed that Iwamoto ("primary") is a synchronous binary system with a minor-planet moon ("secondary") orbiting it every 4.917 days (or 118 hours, which identical to the primary's rotation). Based on the secondary-to-primary mean-diameter ratio (D_{s}/D_{p}) of at least 0.76, it was estimated that Iwamoto and its moon measure 4.0 and 3.5 kilometers, respectively. The diameter of Iwamoto has since increased to 5.5 kilometers (see above). The "Jonstonarchive" estimates that the moon has a semi-major axis of 31 kilometers.

== Naming ==
This minor planet was named in honor of Japanese astronomer Masayuki Iwamoto (born 1954), a discoverer of minor planets at the Tokushima Observatory (872). The approved naming citation was published by the Minor Planet Center on 5 March 1996 (M.P.C. 26763).
