= NGC 662 =

Galaxy in the constellation Andromeda

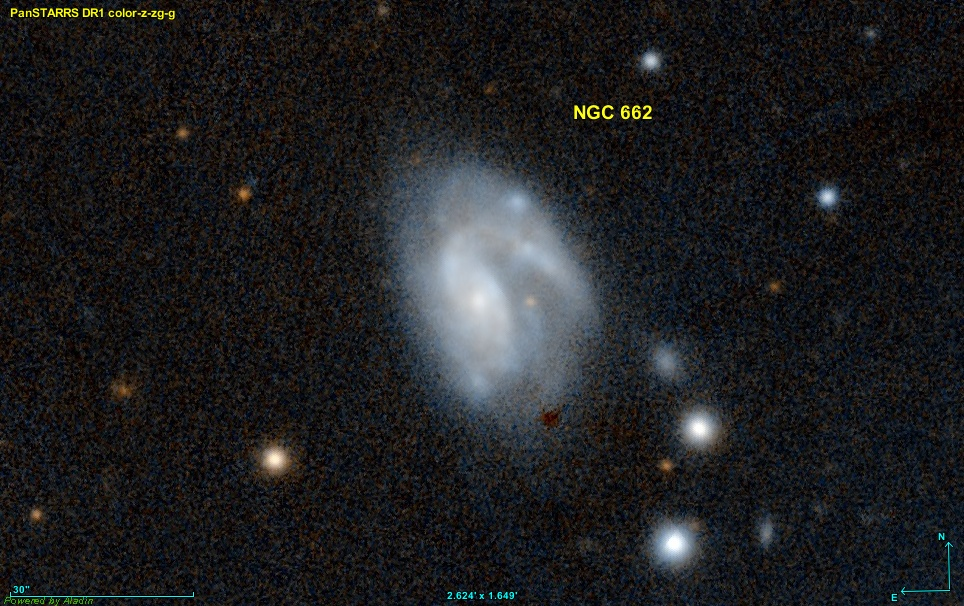
- NGC 662 imaged by Pan-STARRS

Observation data (J2000 epoch)
- Constellation: Andromeda
- Right ascension: 01^{h} 44^{m} 35.4353^{s}
- Declination: +37° 41′ 45.165″
- Redshift: 0.018860
- Heliocentric radial velocity: 5654 ± 4 km/s
- Distance: 259.7 ± 18.2 Mly (79.61 ± 5.58 Mpc)
- Apparent magnitude (V): 13.0

Characteristics
- Type: S pec
- Size: ~89,600 ly (27.48 kpc) (estimated)
- Apparent size (V): 0.8′ × 0.5′

Other designations
- IRAS 01416+3726, 2MASX J01443544+3741447, UGC 1220, MCG +06-04-060, PGC 6393

NGC 662 is a spiral galaxy in the constellation of Andromeda. Its velocity with respect to the cosmic microwave background is 5,397 ± 18 km/s, which corresponds to a Hubble distance of 79.6 ± 5.6 Mpc (~260 million light-years). It was discovered by French astronomer Édouard Stephan on 22 November 1884.

NGC 662 features a broad HI line and is classified a field galaxy, meaning it does not belong to the galaxy group nor a cluster and is therefore gravitationally isolated.

== Supernovae ==
Three supernovae have been observed in NGC 662:

- SN 2001dn (Type Ia, mag. 15.5) was discovered by Tom Boles on 14 August 2001.
- SN 2022ojo (Type II-P, mag. 16.938) was discovered by ATLAS on 5 July 2022.
- SN 2024pcw (Type II, mag. 18.724) was discovered by ATLAS on 8 July 2024.

== See also ==
- List of NGC objects (1–1000)
