= 7472 Kumakiri =

Main belt asteroid

Discovery
- Discovered by: Makio Akiyama and Toshimasa Furuta
- Discovery site: Mishima Observatory
- Discovery date: 13 February 1992

Designations
- Named after: Kazuo Kumakiri
- Alternative designations: 1969 VC_{2} · 1990 WG_{3} · 1992 CU
- Minor planet category: Main belt

Orbital characteristics
- Epoch 21 November 2025 (JD 2461000.5)
- Uncertainty parameter 0
- Aphelion: 3.3411 AU
- Perihelion: 2.6780 AU
- Semi-major axis: 3.0095 AU
- Eccentricity: 0.1102
- Orbital period (sidereal): 5.2210 y (1906.98 d)
- Mean anomaly: 156.985°
- Mean motion: 0.1888° / d
- Inclination: 9.916°
- Longitude of ascending node: 83.356°
- Argument of perihelion: 82.320°
- Jupiter MOID: 1.744 AU
- T_{Jupiter}: 3.218

Physical characteristics
- Mean diameter: 10.008±0.343 km (estimated)
- Geometric albedo: 0.279±0.039 (estimated)
- Spectral type: Unknown/undetermined
- Absolute magnitude (H): 12.38

7472 Kumakiri (provisional designation 1992 CU) is an asteroid from the outer main asteroid belt. It was discovered on 13 February 1992 by astronomers Makio Akiyama and Toshimasa Furuta at Mishima Observatory in Japan. Spectral observations of the asteroid show that it is basaltic in composition, possibly originating from a destroyed, differentiated planetesimal from the Solar System's early history. Its spectral classification is ambiguous, showing characteristics intermediate of multiple asteroid spectral types.

== History ==
Kumakiri was briefly spotted on 15 November 1969 by the Crimean Astrophysical Observatory. Decades later, on 18–19 November 1990, it was observed by La Silla Observatory. Thought to be separate objects, it was assigned a provisional designation each time (1969 VC_{2} and 1990 WG_{3}). It was sighted again on 13 February 1992 by astronomers Makio Akiyama and Toshimasa Furuta, who were observing from Mishima Observatory in Susono, Japan. The asteroid was given another designation 1992 CU, and in 1997 it was given the minor planet number of 7472 by the Minor Planet Center (MPC), with Akiyama and Furuta assigned as its discoverers. It was named by the MPC on 2 February 1999 after Kazuo Kumakiri, an amateur astronomer local to Susono.

== Orbit ==
Kumakiri follows a stable (Note: Per a 50 Myr dynamical simulation.) elliptical orbit around the Sun with an average distance (semi-major axis) of 3.34 astronomical units (AU), inside the outer main asteroid belt. Its semi-major axis places it near the 7:3 mean-motion resonance with Jupiter. It is not a member of any known asteroid family.

Kumakiri takes 5.22 Earth years to complete one orbit. Along its orbit, its distance from the Sun ranges from 2.68 AU at perihelion to 3.34 AU at aphelion due to its orbital eccentricity of 0.11. Its orbit is inclined by 9.9° with respect to the ecliptic.

== Physical characteristics ==
Kumakiri's size, estimated using thermal observations from NEOWISE, is about 10 kilometres (6.2 mi).

Kumakiri's basaltic composition was first suggested by astronomers Fernando Roig and Ricardo Gil-Hutton in 2006 after searching for such asteroids using data from the Sloan Digital Sky Survey. A later study by Roig and R. Duffard in 2009 confirmed its basaltic nature based on its visible spectrum. Basaltic asteroids are thought to form in the mantle of planetesimals from the ancient Solar System. Nearly all known basaltic asteroids are located in the inner main belt within 2.5 AU as members of the prolific Vesta family, associated with the disrupted giant asteroid 4 Vesta. Kumakiri is too distant and spectrally distinct to be related to the Vesta family, implying that it may be a fragment of a different, now destroyed or ejected planetesimal.

Kumakiri is a spectral outlier without a clear spectral classification, with characteristics between the V, R, and O-type asteroids. Roig and Duffard initially identified it as a V-type asteroid. However, its fit for a V-type spectrum was poor, with a comparatively much shallower 2-μm band. Later researchers instead suggested an O-type classification with characteristics similar to—but not matching—that of O-type asteroid 3628 Božněmcová.

== See also ==
- (10537) 1991 RY16 – Spectrally similar asteroid
