= NGC 1620 =

Galaxy in the constellation Eridanus

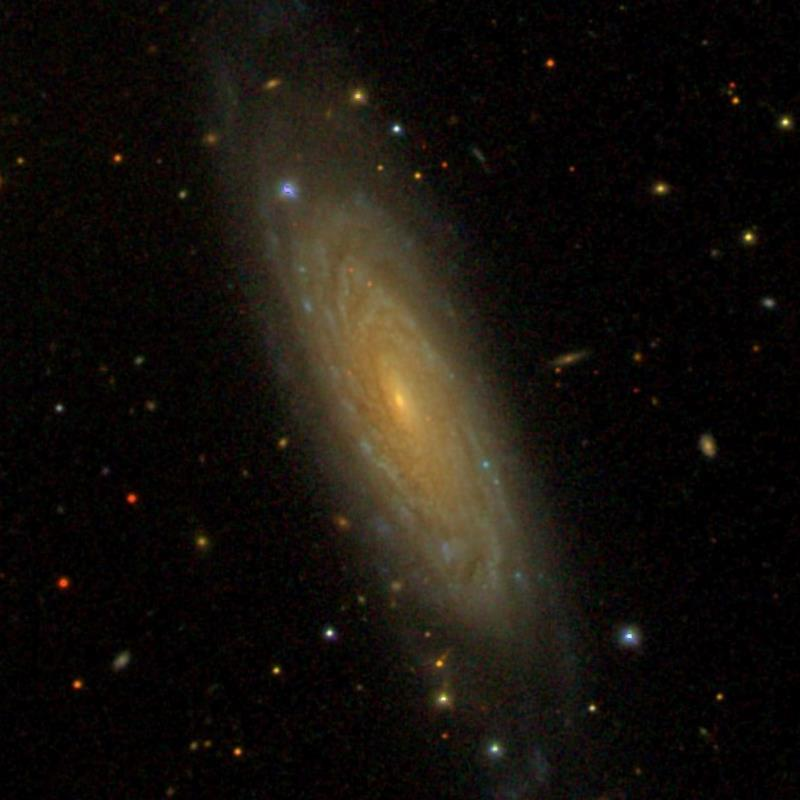
- NGC 1620 imaged by SDSS

Observation data (J2000 epoch)
- Constellation: Eridanus
- Right ascension: 04^{h} 36^{m} 37.3764^{s}
- Declination: −00° 08′ 36.81″
- Redshift: 0.011715
- Heliocentric radial velocity: 3512 ± 1 km/s
- Distance: 166.2 ± 11.6 Mly (50.97 ± 3.57 Mpc)
- Group or cluster: NGC 1589 Group (LGG 117)
- Apparent magnitude (V): 12.3

Characteristics
- Type: SAB(rs)bc
- Size: ~121,000 ly (37.11 kpc) (estimated)
- Apparent size (V): 2.9′ × 1.0′

Other designations
- IRAS 04340-0014, 2MASX J04363734-0008370, UGC 3103, MCG +00-12-052, PGC 15638

NGC 1620 is an intermediate spiral galaxy in the constellation of Eridanus. Its velocity with respect to the cosmic microwave background is 3,455 ± 4 km/s, which corresponds to a Hubble distance of 166.2 ± 11.6 Mly (50.97 ± 3.57 Mpc). However, 20 non-redshift measurements give a closer distance of 130.02 ± 3.26 Mly (39.865 ± 1.001 Mpc). It was discovered by German-British astronomer William Herschel on 1 January 1786.

== Supernovae ==
Two supernovae have been observed in NGC 1620:

- SN 2009K (Type IIb, mag. 14.9) was discovered by CHASE (CHilean Automatic Supernovas sEarch) on 14 January 2009.
- SN 2023crx (Type Ib, mag. 18.57) was discovered by the Gaia Photometric Science Alerts on 1 March 2023.

== NGC 1589 Group ==
According to A.M. Garcia, the galaxy NGC 1620 is part of the NGC 1589 Group (also known as LGG 117) that includes at least 8 other galaxies: NGC 1586, NGC 1587, NGC 1588, NGC 1589, UGC 3054, UGC 3058, UGC 3072 and UGC 3080.

== See also ==
- List of NGC objects (1001–2000)
