= Toshimasa Furuta =

Japanese astronomer

Minor planets discovered: 82
see § List of discovered minor planets

Toshimasa Furuta (古田 俊正, Furuta Toshimasa) is a Japanese astronomer. He is a prolific discoverer of asteroids.

== List of discovered minor planets ==
List of minor planets discovered by Toshimasa Furuta

Name	Discovery Date	Listing
2478 Tokai	4 May 1981	list
2908 Shimoyama	18 November 1981	list
3814 Hoshi-no-mura	4 May 1981	list
4265 Kani	8 October 1989	list^{[A]}
4351 Nobuhisa	28 October 1989	list^{[A]}
4353 Onizaki	25 November 1989	list^{[A]}
4541 Mizuno	1 January 1989	list^{[B]}
4614 Masamura	21 August 1990	list^{[A]}
4717 Kaneko	20 November 1989	list^{[A]}
4799 Hirasawa	8 October 1989	list^{[A]}
(4835) 1989 BQ	29 January 1989	list^{[C]}
4903 Ichikawa	20 October 1989	list^{[A]}
4904 Makio	21 November 1989	list^{[A]}
4951 Iwamoto	21 January 1990	list^{[A]}
5236 Yoko	10 October 1990	list^{[A]}
5287 Heishu	20 November 1989	list^{[A]}
5288 Nankichi	3 December 1989	list^{[A]}
5295 Masayo	5 February 1991	list^{[A]}
5333 Kanaya	18 October 1990	list^{[D]}
5334 Mishima	8 February 1991	list^{[D]}
5399 Awa	29 January 1989	list^{[C]}
5581 Mitsuko	10 February 1989	list^{[C]}
5743 Kato	19 October 1990	list^{[D]}
5775 Inuyama	29 September 1989	list^{[A]}
5777 Hanaki	3 December 1989	list^{[A]}
5908 Aichi	20 October 1989	list^{[A]}
5909 Nagoya	23 October 1989	list^{[A]}
6228 Yonezawa	17 January 1982	list
6251 Setsuko	25 February 1992	list^{[D]}
6383 Tokushima	12 December 1988	list^{[C]}
6392 Takashimizuno	29 April 1990	list^{[A]}
6419 Susono	7 December 1993	list^{[D]}
6554 Takatsuguyoshida	28 October 1989	list^{[A]}
6661 Ikemura	17 January 1993	list^{[A]}
6792 Akiyamatakashi	30 November 1991	list^{[D]}
6902 Hideoasada	26 October 1989	list^{[A]}
6961 Ashitaka	26 May 1989	list^{[D]}
7237 Vickyhamilton	3 November 1988	list^{[B]}
7238 Kobori	27 July 1989	list^{[A]}
7240 Hasebe	19 December 1989	list^{[A]}
7408 Yoshihide	23 September 1989	list^{[A]}
7472 Kumakiri	13 February 1992	list^{[D]}
(7518) 1989 FG	29 March 1989	list^{[B]}
7648 Tomboles	8 October 1989	list^{[A]}

Name	Discovery Date	Listing
7992 Yozan	28 November 1981	list
8188 Okegaya	18 December 1992	list^{[A]}
8251 Isogai	8 November 1980	list
8272 Iitatemura	24 September 1989	list^{[A]}
8273 Apatheia	29 November 1989	list^{[D]}
(8278) 1991 JJ	4 May 1991	list^{[A]}
(8351) 1989 EH_{1}	10 March 1989	list^{[B]}
(8487) 1989 SQ	29 September 1989	list^{[A]}
(8490) 1989 TU_{10}	4 October 1989	list^{[A]}
(8851) 1990 XB	8 December 1990	list^{[A]}
(8864) 1991 VU	4 November 1991	list^{[A]}
(8873) 1992 UM_{2}	21 October 1992	list^{[A]}
9033 Kawane	4 January 1990	list^{[D]}
(9039) 1990 WB4	16 November 1990	list^{[A]}
9943 Bizan	29 October 1989	list^{[C]}
(11281) 1989 UM_{1}	28 October 1989	list^{[A]}
(11501) 1989 UU_{3}	29 October 1989	list^{[A]}
(11503) 1990 BF	21 January 1990	list^{[A]}
(11865) 1989 SC	23 September 1989	list^{[A]}
(11867) 1989 TW	4 October 1989	list^{[B]}
(11924) 1992 WS_{3}	17 November 1992	list^{[A]}
(12745) 1992 UL_{2}	21 October 1992	list^{[A]}
(13034) 1989 UN	23 October 1989	list^{[A]}
(14851) 1989 SD	23 September 1989	list^{[A]}
(14852) 1989 SE	23 September 1989	list^{[A]}
(15715) 1989 UN_{1}	28 October 1989	list^{[A]}
(16456) 1989 UO	23 October 1989	list^{[A]}
(17441) 1989 UE	20 October 1989	list^{[A]}
17651 Tajimi	3 November 1996	list^{[E]}
(19138) 1989 EJ_{1}	10 March 1989	list^{[B]}
(19144) 1989 UP_{1}	28 October 1989	list^{[A]}
(19977) 1989 TQ	7 October 1989	list^{[A]}
(20020) 1991 VT	4 November 1991	list^{[A]}
(20036) 1992 UW_{1}	21 October 1992	list^{[A]}
(22297) 1989 WA_{1}	21 November 1989	list^{[A]}
(23456) 1989 DB	26 February 1989	list^{[B]}
27714 Dochu	29 January 1989	list^{[C]}
(29164) 1989 UA	20 October 1989	list^{[A]}
Co-discovery made with:^{A} Y. Mizuno^{B} K. Suzuki^{C} M. Iwamoto^{D} M. Akiyama^{E} T. Mizuno
