= Tom Boles =

Scottish astronomer (born 1944)

Thomas Boles (born 1944 in Lennoxtown in Scotland) is a Scottish amateur astronomer, discoverer of astronomical objects, author, broadcaster and former communications and computer engineer, who observes from his private "Coddenham Observatory" (234) in Coddenham, Suffolk, United Kingdom. He is known for having discovered a record number of supernovae. The main-belt asteroid 7648 Tomboles is named in his honor.

He was President of the British Astronomical Association from 2003 to 2005 and Vice President from 2005 to 2007. He is a Fellow of the Royal Astronomical Society and an Examinations Moderator in astronomy with the International Baccalaureate. At the International Astronomical Union, he was a member of Division VIII Galaxies & the Universe and "Commission 28" until 2012 and 2015, respectively, and is a member of IAU's division C and J (Education, Outreach and Heritage; Galaxies and Cosmology).

Boles has co-authored three text books on popular astronomy and has published numerous articles in Astronomy Now, Sky and Telescope; the Austrian The Star Observer, the Journal of the British Astronomical Association, and in the journal The Astronomer. In 2007 he co-authored a research paper about a "giant outburst two years before the core-collapse of a massive star" in the journal Nature.

Boles holds a bachelor's degree in biochemistry from the Open University. He held director level appointments over a period of 18 years with four multinational computer companies. He retired in 2001 to dedicate himself to astronomy work and to help with the public Outreach of astronomy.

== Discoveries ==
Minor planets discovered: 1
| 84417 Ritabo | 5 October 2002 | MPC |

He holds the record of spotting the most supernovae by one person: 149 supernovae. As of 2003, Boles and Mark Armstrong are the "most successful exploding star hunters in history." He broke the record after discovering his 124th supernova '2009ij', followed by supernova number 125 '2009io' a few nights later. The previous record holder was Swiss astronomer Fritz Zwicky, who discovered 123 supernovae before his death in 1974. The record was unbroken for 36 years.

Boles has also discovered a nova in the Andromeda Galaxy and 84417 Ritabo, an asteroid in the middle region of the main-belt, which he named after his wife Rita Boles.

== Awards ==
In 2008 he was awarded the Merlin Medal by the British Astronomical Association in recognition of his contribution to the advancement of astronomy. In 2008 the inner main-belt asteroid 7648 Tomboles, discovered by Japanese astronomers Yoshikane Mizuno and Toshimasa Furuta, was named after him in recognition of his contribution to astronomy. He received the George Alcock Award from The Astronomer Magazine. Boles presented the Inaugural Thomas Tannahill Memorial lecture in 2009 at the request of the Astronomical Society of Glasgow. He received the Walter Goodacre Medal and Gift from the British Astronomical Association in 2015.

== Public outreach ==
Boles has co-authored three text books on popular astronomy:

- 2008 Yearbook of Astronomy, edited by Sir Patrick Moore – (Pan Macmillan)
- More Small Astronomical Observatories, edited by Sir Patrick Moore – (Springer Science+Business Media)
- The Science and Art of CDD Astronomy, edited Ratledge – (Springer Science+Business Media)

Boles's Television broadcasts include: Co-presenting BBC Tomorrow's World and guest appearances on several BBC programmes such as The Sky at Night, Final Frontiers, All Night Star Party (from Jodrell Bank); BBC Astronomers and ITV Vera Productions. Radio Broadcasts include Radio 2, Suffolk Radio, BBC Essex, Radio Northampton, Three Counties Radio, Radio Scotland, World Radio (Netherlands) and BBC Citizen Science.

In his later years, (2021-2022) Boles has also written three thrillers, recounting the adventures of Cambridge astronomer Brad Willis, who also moonlight for MI6 in cases where his scientific knowledge is needed.

- Dark Energy
- Shades of White
- Murder by Limo

== See also ==
- Discoverers of minor planets § T. Boles
- History of supernova observation § Telescope observation
- Supernova § Naming convention
