= Kanaya (surname) =

Kanaya is a Japanese surname. Notable people with the surname include:

- Hideo Kanaya (1945–2013), Japanese Grand Prix motorcycle racer
- Takumi Kanaya (born 1998), Japanese professional golfer
- Zeus (Japanese wrestler) (born 1982), who used the ring name Shigemasa Kanaya
