= 1459 Magnya =

Main-belt asteroid

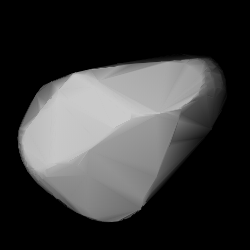
- Shape of Magnya modelled from its lightcurve

Discovery
- Discovered by: G. Neujmin
- Discovery site: Simeiz Obs.
- Discovery date: 4 November 1937

Designations
- Named after: Magnya ("clear, bright, wonderful")
- Alternative designations: 1937 VA
- Minor planet category: main-belt · (outer) background

Orbital characteristics
- Epoch 4 September 2017 (JD 2458000.5)
- Uncertainty parameter 0
- Observation arc: 79.48 yr (29,030 days)
- Aphelion: 3.8761 AU
- Perihelion: 2.4113 AU
- Semi-major axis: 3.1437 AU
- Eccentricity: 0.2330
- Orbital period (sidereal): 5.57 yr (2,036 days)
- Mean anomaly: 121.53°
- Mean motion: 0° 10^{m} 36.48^{s} / day
- Inclination: 16.940°
- Longitude of ascending node: 41.541°
- Argument of perihelion: 328.81°

Physical characteristics
- Dimensions: 17 km 17.4 km (taken); 29.188±1.833 km 29.90±3.1 km
- Synodic rotation period: 4.678±0.001 h 4.67888±0.00004 h 4.679100±0.000005 h 4.679102±0.000001 h 4.67911±0.00005 h 4.68 h 4.680 h
- Geometric albedo: 0.2168±0.053; 0.37; 0.909±0.224
- Spectral type: V (Tholen)
- Absolute magnitude (H): 8.39 · 9.90 · 10.4 · 10.5 · 10.69±0.23

1459 Magnya, provisional designation 1937 VA, is a basaltic, slightly elongated asteroid from the outer regions of the asteroid belt, approximately 20 kilometers in diameter. Discovered by Grigory Neujmin at the Simeiz Observatory in 1937, this background asteroid was later named from the Latin word "Magnya", which means "clear, bright, wonderful" when literally translated into Russian. It is the only known basalt asteroid orbiting beyond 4 Vesta.

== Discovery ==
Magnya was discovered on 4 November 1937, by Soviet astronomer Grigory Neujmin at the Simeiz Observatory on the Crimean peninsula. Two nights later, it was independently discovered by French astronomer André Patry at Nice Observatory on 6 November 1937. The Minor Planet Center only recognizes the first discoverer, although Patry was first to announce the discovery. However, André Patry later received the honor to name the asteroid (see below).

== Orbit and classification ==
Magnya is a non-family asteroid of the main belt's background population. It orbits the Sun in the outer asteroid belt at a distance of 2.4–3.9 AU once every 5 years and 7 months (2,036 days). Its orbit has an eccentricity of 0.23 and an inclination of 17° with respect to the ecliptic. The body's observation arc begins at Nice Observatory, 22 days after its official discovery observation at Simeiz.

== Physical characteristics ==
=== Spectral type and mineralogy ===
Magnya is a V-type asteroid in the Tholen classification. The spectrum of this object show that it has a basaltic surface, which may indicate that it is a remnant from a larger parent body that underwent differentiation prior to breaking up. As of 2000, it is the only known basalt asteroid orbiting beyond 4 Vesta in the outer main belt.

=== Rotation period and poles ===
Several rotational lightcurves of Magnya have been obtained from photometric observations since 2005. Lightcurve analysis gave a consolidated rotation period of 4.678 hours with a brightness variation between 0.57 and 0.84 magnitude (U=3/3/2/3). A high brightness amplitude is indicative of a non-spherical, elongated shape.

The asteroid's lightcurve has also been modeled several time using photometric data from the Lowell Photometric Database and other sources. Modelling gave a concurring (sidereal) period of 4.679100, 4.679102 and 4.67911 hours. The studies determined two spin axis in ecliptic coordinates (λ, β): (73.0°, −54.0°) and (198.0°, −55.0°), as well as (72.0°, −59.0°) and (207.0°, −51.0°). Modeling also confirmed that the body is a slightly elongated ellipsoid, and revealed that it is rotating along the smallest axis and that it has an almost homogeneous surface.

=== Diameter and albedo ===
According to the surveys carried out by the Infrared Astronomical Satellite IRAS and the NEOWISE mission of NASA's Wide-field Infrared Survey Explorer, as well as interferometric observations with the VLTI, Magnya measures between 17 and 29.90 kilometers in diameter and its surface has an albedo between 0.2168 and an exceptionally high 0.909.

The Collaborative Asteroid Lightcurve Link adopts the results obtained by the VLT, that is an albedo of 0.37 and takes a diameter of 17.4 kilometers based on an absolute magnitude of 10.5.

== Naming ==
This minor planet was named after "Magnya", which means "clear, bright, wonderful" when literally translated from Latin into Russian. The name was proposed by the second, unofficial discoverer André Patry, who was also the first to compute the asteroid's orbit (research by the author of the Dictionary of Minor Planet Names, Lutz D. Schmadel, is based on private communications with Crimean astronomers N. Solovaya and N. S. Chernykh).
