= Yoshikane Mizuno =

Japanese astronomer

Minor planets discovered: 52
see § List of discovered minor planets

Yoshikane Mizuno (水野 義兼, Mizuno Yoshikane; born 1954) is a Japanese astronomer and co-discoverer of asteroids. The Minor Planet Center credits him with the discovery of 52 minor planets he made at the Kani Observatory (403) between 1989 and 1993.

The inner main-belt asteroid 4541 Mizuno, discovered by his college Toshimasa Furuta, was named in his honor on 5 March 1996 (M.P.C. 26762).

== List of discovered minor planets ==
List of minor planets discovered by Yoshikane Mizuno

Name	Discovery Date
4265 Kani^{[1]}	October 8, 1989
4614 Masamura^{[1]}	August 21, 1990
4717 Kaneko^{[1]}	November 20, 1989
4799 Hirasawa^{[1]}	October 8, 1989
4903 Ichikawa^{[1]}	October 20, 1989
4904 Makio^{[1]}	November 21, 1989
4951 Iwamoto^{[1]}	January 21, 1990
5236 Yoko^{[1]}	October 10, 1990
5287 Heishu^{[1]}	November 20, 1989
5288 Nankichi^{[1]}	December 3, 1989
5295 Masayo^{[1]}	February 5, 1991
5775 Inuyama^{[1]}	September 29, 1989
5777 Hanaki^{[1]}	December 3, 1989
5908 Aichi^{[1]}	October 20, 1989
5909 Nagoya^{[1]}	October 23, 1989
6392 Takashimizuno^{[1]}	April 29, 1990
6554 Takatsuguyoshida^{[1]}	October 28, 1989
6661 Ikemura^{[1]}	January 17, 1993
6902 Hideoasada^{[1]}	October 26, 1989
7238 Kobori^{[1]}	July 27, 1989
7240 Hasebe^{[1]}	December 19, 1989
7408 Yoshihide^{[1]}	September 23, 1989
7648 Tomboles^{[1]}	October 8, 1989
8188 Okegaya^{[1]}	December 18, 1992
8272 Iitatemura^{[1]}	September 29, 1989
(8278) 1991 JJ^{[1]}	May 4, 1991

Name	Discovery Date
(8487) 1989 SQ^{[1]}	September 29, 1989
(8490) 1989 TU_{10}^{[1]}	October 4, 1989
(8851) 1990 XB^{[1]}	December 8, 1990
(8864) 1991 VU^{[1]}	November 4, 1991
(8873) 1992 UM_{2}^{[1]}	October 21, 1992
(9039) 1990 WB4^{[1]}	November 16, 1990
(11281) 1989 UM_{1}^{[1]}	October 28, 1989
(11501) 1989 UU_{3}^{[1]}	October 29, 1989
(11503) 1990 BF^{[1]}	January 21, 1990
(11865) 1989 SC^{[1]}	September 23, 1989
(11924) 1992 WS_{3}^{[1]}	November 17, 1992
(12745) 1992 UL_{2}^{[1]}	October 21, 1992
(13034) 1989 UN^{[1]}	October 23, 1989
(14851) 1989 SD^{[1]}	September 23, 1989
(14852) 1989 SE^{[1]}	September 23, 1989
(15715) 1989 UN_{1}^{[1]}	October 28, 1989
(16456) 1989 UO^{[1]}	October 23, 1989
(17441) 1989 UE^{[1]}	October 20, 1989
17651 Tajimi^{[1]}	November 3, 1996
(19144) 1989 UP_{1}^{[1]}	October 28, 1989
(19977) 1989 TQ^{[1]}	October 7, 1989
(20020) 1991 VT^{[1]}	November 4, 1991
(22297) 1989 WA_{1}^{[1]}	November 21, 1989
(29164) 1989 UA^{[1]}	October 20, 1989
^{1} with T. Furuta
