= Kanaya, Shizuoka =

Kanaya 金谷町
- Former municipality
- Flag Emblem

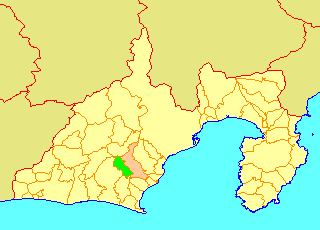
- Location of Kanaya in Shizuoka Prefecture

- Location in Japan
- Coordinates: 34.83449°N 138.12675°E
- Country: Japan
- Region: Chūbu (Tōkai)
- Prefecture: Shizuoka Prefecture
- District: Hiabara
- Merged: May 1, 2005 (now part of Shimada)

Area
  - Total: 64.36 km^{2} (24.85 sq mi)

Population (October 2008)
  - Total: 20,364
  - Density: 318.29/km^{2} (824.4/sq mi)
- Time zone: UTC+09:00 (JST)
- Website: www.city.shimada.shizuoka.jp
- Symbols
- Flower: Rhododendron
- Tree: Camellia sinensis

Kanaya (金谷町, Kanaya-chō) was a town located in Haibara District, Shizuoka Prefecture, Japan. As of 2005, the town had an estimated population of 20,364 and a density of 318.29 persons per km^{2}. The total area was 64.36 km^{2}.

== History ==
On May 5, 2005, Kanaya was merged into its long-time twin city, the expanded city of Shimada and thus no longer exists as an independent municipality.

Kanaya was developed from the Edo period as Kanaya-juku, a post town on the Tōkaidō. Located on the west bank of the Ōi River, Kanaya prospered from the Tokugawa Shogunate's policy of not allowing any bridge or ferry to be established on the Ōi River in order to strengthen Edo's defenses. Travellers waiting to cross the river on foot were often trapped in Kanaya for days, if not weeks, waiting for the river to become shallow enough to ford.

Kanaya Town was established in 1889. It merged with neighboring Goka Village in 1957.

== Economy ==
Its main industry was green tea production.

== See also ==
- Kanaya Station
- Shin-Kanaya Station
