= 2025 J2 League =

27th season of the J2 League

J2 League
- Season: 2025
- Dates: 15 February – 29 November 2025
- Champions: Mito HollyHock (1st title)
- Promoted: Mito HollyHock; V-Varen Nagasaki; JEF United Chiba
- Relegated: Renofa Yamaguchi; Roasso Kumamoto; Ehime FC
- Matches: 380
- Goals: 934 (2.46 per match)
- Top goalscorer: Matheus Jesus (19 goals)
- Biggest home win: JEF United Chiba 5–1 Ehime FC (16 March); Iwaki FC 5–1 Roasso Kumamoto (1 June); Júbilo Iwata 5–1 Consadole Sapporo (12 July)
- Biggest away win: Roasso Kumamoto 0–4 RB Omiya Ardija (2 March); Montedio Yamagata 0–4 Ventforet Kofu
- Highest scoring: V-Varen Nagasaki 3–4 Iwaki FC (25 April); Montedio Yamagata 3–4 Vegalta Sendai (15 June)
- Highest attendance: 49,991; JEF United Chiba 1–2 RB Omiya Ardija (6 May 2025)
- Lowest attendance: 2,610; Mito HollyHock 2–1 Roasso Kumamoto (17 May 2025)
- Total attendance: 3,377,480
- Average attendance: 8,888

The 2025 J2 League, also known as the 2025 Meiji Yasuda J2 League (Japanese: 2025 明治安田J2リーグ, Hepburn: 2025 Meiji Yasuda J2 Rīgu) for sponsorship reasons, was the 27th season of the J2 League, the second-tier Japanese professional league for association football clubs, since its establishment in 1999. This was also the eleventh season of the league since its rebrand from J.League Division 2.

== Overview ==
This was the last J.League season played in a whole calendar year from late winter to early winter, with the following season onwards played from summer to spring.

== Schedule ==
The league and match format were announced on 25 November 2024, with the season starts on 15 February 2025 and concluded on 29 November 2025.

Promotion play-off was held from 7 to 13 December 2025.

== Changes from the previous season ==
Tochigi SC, Kagoshima United and Thespa Gunma were relegated to the 2025 J3 League, finishing the previous season as 18th, 19th and 20th placed, respectively, ended seven, one and five years stays in the second-tier, respectively.

Júbilo Iwata, Hokkaido Consadole Sapporo and Sagan Tosu were relegated from the 2024 J1 League, after one, eight and thirteen season in the top flight, respectively.

Both Shimizu S-Pulse and Yokohama FC are promoted to the 2025 J1 League as champions and runners-up, respectively, of the previous J2 League season. Shizuoka-based Shimizu will return in the top flight of Japanese football after two years absence, while Yokohama FC will make their immediate comeback to the J1. Joining them are Fagiano Okayama, who finished 5th in 2024 and earned promotion after winning the promotion play-offs, thus making their first top flight appearance from next season.

2024 J3 League winners Omiya Ardija, runners-up FC Imabari, and promotion play-off winners Kataller Toyama were both promoted from the J3 League. Omiya are returning to the second-tier after one-year absence, Imabari makes their debut in the second-tier for this season and Kataller, who finished 3rd, earned promotion after winning the promotion play-offs, thus returning after 11 years absence.

From this season, Omiya Ardija changed their name to RB Omiya Ardija after they were acquired by Red Bull since 2025.

== Clubs ==
Locations of the 2025 J2 League teams

Club name	Hometown	Stadium	Capacity	Previous season rank	License
Blaublitz Akita	Akita, Akita	Soyu Stadium	18,560	J2 (10th)	J1
Ehime FC	All cities/towns in Ehime (Note: centering on Matsuyama)	Ningineer Stadium	20,919	J2 (17st)	J1
Fujieda MYFC	Cities/towns in Shizuoka Prefecture	Fujieda Soccer Stadium	10,057	J2 (13th)	J1
Hokkaido Consadole Sapporo	Hokkaido	Sapporo Dome	38,794	J1 (19th)	J1
FC Imabari	Imabari, Ehime	ASICS Satoyama Stadium	5,316	J3 (2nd)	J2
Iwaki FC	Iwaki and Futaba District, Fukushima	Hawaiians Stadium Iwaki	5,066	J2 (9th)	J1
JEF United Chiba	Chiba & Ichihara, Chiba	Fukuda Denshi Arena	19,470	J2 (7th)	J1
Júbilo Iwata	Iwata, Shizuoka	Yamaha Stadium	15,156	J1 (18th)	J1
Kataller Toyama	All cities/towns in Toyama (Note: centering on Toyama)	Toyama Athletic Stadium	18,588	J3 (3rd)	J1
Mito HollyHock	All cities/towns in central and northern Ibaraki (Note: Mito, Hitachi, Hitachinaka, Kasama, Naka, Omitama, Hitachiota, Kitaibaraki, Hitachiomiya, Takahagi, Ibaraki, Shirosato, Oarai, Daigo, Tokai)	K's denki Stadium Mito	10,152	J2 (15th)	J1
Montedio Yamagata	All cities/towns in Yamagata (Note: centering on Yamagata, Tendo, Tsuruoka)	ND Soft Stadium	20,638	J2 (4th)	J1
Oita Trinita	Ōita, Ōita	Crasus Dome Oita	31,997	J2 (16th)	J1
RB Omiya Ardija	Saitama, Saitama	NACK5 Stadium Omiya	15,491	J3 (1st)	J1
Renofa Yamaguchi	All cities/towns in Yamaguchi	Ishin Me-Life Stadium	15,115	J2 (11th)	J1
Roasso Kumamoto	Kumamoto, Kumamoto	Egao Kenko Stadium	30,275	J2 (12th)	J1
Sagan Tosu	Tosu, Saga	Ekimae Real Estate Stadium	20,805	J1 (20th)	J1
Tokushima Vortis	Tokushima, Tokushima	Pocarisweat Stadium	17,924	J2 (8th)	J1
V-Varen Nagasaki	All cities/towns in Nagasaki Prefecture (Note: centering on Nagasaki and Isahaya)	Peace Stadium Connected by SoftBank	20,027	J2 (3rd)	J1
Vegalta Sendai	Miyagi Prefecture	Yurtec Stadium Sendai	19,526	J2 (6th)	J1
Ventforet Kofu	All cities/towns in Yamanashi Prefecture (Note: centering on Kofu and Nirasaki)	JIT Recycle Ink Stadium	15,853	J2 (14th)	J1

=== Personnel and kits ===
Club	Manager	Captain	Kit manufacturer	Kit sponsors	
Club	Manager	Captain	Kit manufacturer	Main	Other(s)
Blaublitz Akita	(Japan) Ken Yoshida	(Japan) Hiroto Morooka	(Brazil) Athleta	TDK	List: Front: Akita Sakigake Shimpō, Akita Komachi; Back: Traffic RentalxLease, A2Care; Sleeves: Corolla Akita, Akita City, Akita Prefecture; Shorts:
Ehime FC	(Japan) Shinya Aono (Interim)	(Japan) Fuma Shirasaka	(Japan) Jogarbola	Ningineer Network	List: Front: BenefitOne; Back: Iyo Bank; Sleeves: Miura, Ehime; Shorts:
Fujieda MYFC	(Japan) Daisuke Sudo	(Japan) Masahiko Sugita	(Japan) Gol.	Seikan Kensa Center	List: Front: Shimada Kakegawa Shinkin Bank, Sakai Industry; Back: Sumitomo Bakelite, Touzai; Sleeves: Kakumaru Construction, Fujieda City, Yaizu City, Shimada City, Makinohara City, Yoshida Town, Kawane Town; Shorts:
Hokkaido Consadole Sapporo	(Japan) Shingo Shibata	(Japan) Takuma Arano	(Japan) Mizuno	Ishiya	List: Front: Katagiri, A.I.PLAN; Back: LeoFun, Diamond Head; Sleeves: Hokkaido; Shorts:
FC Imabari	(Japan) Keiji Kuraishi	(Japan) Yuta Mikado	(Japan) Asics	Unicharm	List: Front: Reproduction Clinic Osaka, Starboard; Back: Imabari Shipbuilding, Xymax; Sleeves: Mitsubishi Corporation, Imabari; Shorts:
Iwaki FC	(Japan) Yuzo Tamura	(Japan) Ryo Endo	(United States) Under Armour	BHC	List: Front: Starts, Showa Astec; Back: Alps Alpine, Rohto; Sleeves: Iwaki; Shorts:
JEF United Chiba	(Japan) Yoshiyuki Kobayashi	(Japan) Daisuke Suzuki	(Denmark) Hummel	Fuji Electric	List: Front: JR East, Furukawa Electric; Back: JRE Mall, ShinShowa; Sleeves: TPX Abel; Shorts:
Júbilo Iwata	(Japan) Takayoshi Amma	(Japan) Hiroki Yamada	(England) Admiral	Yamaha	List: Front: Fibee; Back: SALA Group, Sakura Kogyo; Sleeves: Hamamatsu Photonics; Shorts:
Kataller Toyama	(Japan) Ryo Adachi	(Japan) Riki Matsuda	(Japan) Goldwin	YKK AP	List: Front: Kenko Group, Shoei Group; Back: Hokuriku Electric Power Company, Hokuriku Electric Industry; Sleeves: Izak, Toyama; Shorts:
Mito HollyHock	(Japan) Naoki Mori	(Japan)	(Japan) soccer junky	K's Holdings	List: Front: Adastria; Back: JX Advanced Metals; Sleeves: Mito, Hitachi, Hitachinaka, Kasama, Naka, Omitama, Hitachiota, Kitaibaraki, Hitachiomiya, Takahagi, Ibaraki, Shirosato, Oarai, Daigo, Tokai; Shorts:
Montedio Yamagata	(Japan) Akinobu Yokouchi	(Japan) Shuto Minami	(Brazil) Penalty	ABeam	List: Front: Yamagata Nissan Group, SCO Group; Back: Tsuyahime, Yukiwakamaru, Tohoku Denka; Sleeves: Denroku, Yamagata; Shorts:
Oita Trinita	(Japan) Minoru Takenaka	(Japan) Arata Watanabe	(Germany) Puma	Daihatsu Kyushu	List: Front: Crasus Chemical, TKP; Back: Shiraishi; Sleeves: Oita; Shorts:
RB Omiya Ardija	(Japan) Yuki Miyazawa		(United States) Under Armour	Red Bull	List: Front: NTT, Musashino Bank; Back: Red Bull, Shimamura Group; Sleeves: Saitama; Shorts:
Renofa Yamaguchi	(Japan) Genki Nakayama		(Brazil) Finta	upr	List: Front: Fuji Robotics, Yamaguchi Bank; Back: Yamaguchi Mazda, Ube City; Sleeves: Frontier Direct, Yamaguchi; Shorts: MaxValu
Roasso Kumamoto	(Japan) Takeshi Oki	(Japan) Rei Hirakawa	(England) Admiral	Hirata	List: Front: Higo Bank, RKKCS; Back: Hakutake Shiro; Sleeves: Kumamoto; Shorts:
Sagan Tosu	(Japan) Akio Kogiku	(Japan) Naoyuki Fujita	(United States) New Balance	Kimura Information Technology	List: Front: X-Mobile, Saga SSP; Back: Best Amenity, Animal One; Sleeves: SUMCO, Tosu; Shorts:
Tokushima Vortis	(Japan) Kosaku Masuda	(Japan) Yoichiro Kakitani	(Japan) Mizuno	Pocari Sweat	List: Front: Work Staff, BODYMAINTÉ; Back: Otsuka Pharmaceutical, Fair Pride; Sleeves: Earth Corporation, Tokushima; Shorts:
V-Varen Nagasaki	(Japan) Takuya Takagi	(Japan) Hiroki Akino	(United States) Fanatics	Japanet	List: Front: Transcosmos, Memolead; Back: MSC Cruises, MS&AD Insurance Group; Sleeves: Moririn, Fair and Just ~from Nagasaki to the world~, Nagasaki; Shorts:
Vegalta Sendai	(Japan) Yoshiro Moriyama	(Japan) Yasushi Endo	(Germany) Adidas	Iris Ohyama	List: Front: SBI Securities; Back: SBI Securities; Sleeves: 77 Bank, Sendai; Shorts: Mynavi
Ventforet Kofu	(Japan) Shinji Otsuka	(Japan) Masahiro Sekiguchi	(Japan) Mizuno	Hakubaku	List: Front: YSK e-com, Nihon Network Service; Back: Yamanashi Chuo Bank, Kyokuyo; Sleeves: Kusuri no Sunroad, Yamanashi; Shorts:

=== Managerial changes ===
Team	Outgoing manager	Manner of departure	Date of vacancy	Position in the table	Incoming manager	Date of appointment
Hokkaido Consadole Sapporo	(Serbia) Mihailo Petrović	End of contract	4 December 2024	Pre-season	(Japan) Daiki Iwamasa	12 December 2024
Júbilo Iwata	(Japan) Akinobu Yokouchi	End of contract	11 December 2024	Pre-season	(Malta) John Hutchinson	19 December 2024
Ehime FC	(Japan) Kiyotaka Ishimaru	Sacked	21 May 2025	20th	(Japan) Shinya Aono (Interim)	21 May 2025
Kataller Toyama	(Japan) Michiharu Otagiri	Resigned	27 May 2025	17th	(Japan) Ryo Adachi	27 May 2025
V-Varen Nagasaki	(Japan) Takahiro Shimotaira	Sacked	17 June 2025	8th	(Japan) Takuya Takagi	22 June 2025
Montedio Yamagata	(Japan) Susumu Watanabe	Sacked	18 June 2025	17th	(Japan) Jin Sato (interim)	18 June 2025
Renofa Yamaguchi	(Japan) Ryo Shigaki	Sacked	24 June 2025	18th	(Japan) Genki Nakayama	24 June 2025
Montedio Yamagata	(Japan) Jin Sato (interim)	End of Interim	25 June 2025	15th	(Japan) Akinobu Yokouchi	25 June 2025
Hokkaido Consadole Sapporo	(Japan) Daiki Iwamasa	Sacked	10 August 2025	11th	(Japan) Shingo Shibata	11 August 2025
Oita Trinita	(Japan) Tomohiro Katanosaka	Sacked	18 August 2025	16th	(Japan) Minoru Takenaka	18 August 2025
RB Omiya Ardija	(Japan) Tetsu Nagasawa	Sacked	24 September 2025	8th	(Japan) Yuki Miyazawa	24 September 2025
Júbilo Iwata	(Malta) John Hutchinson	Sacked	29 September 2025	8th	(Japan) Takayoshi Amma	29 September 2025

=== Foreign players ===
As of the 2024 season, there are no more restrictions on a number of signed foreign players, but clubs can only register up to five foreign players for a single match-day squad. Players from J.League partner nations (Thailand, Vietnam, Myanmar, Malaysia, Cambodia, Singapore, Indonesia and Qatar) are exempt from these restrictions.

- Players name in **bold** indicates the player is registered during the midseason transfer window.
- Player's name in italics indicates the player has Japanese nationality in addition to their FIFA nationality or is exempt from being treated as a foreign player due to having been born in Japan and being enrolled in, or having graduated from school in the country.

Club	Player 1	Player 2	Player 3	Player 4	Player 5	Player 6	Player 7	Player 8	Former players
Blaublitz Akita	(Serbia) Luka Radotić								
Ehime FC	(Australia) Ben Duncan	(Brazil) Arthur Viana	(Brazil) Marcel Scalese	(South Korea) **Kang Sung-chan**	(South Korea) **Lee Jae-hwan**				(South Korea) Bak Keon-woo (Thailand) Ekanit Panya
Fujieda MYFC	(Brazil) Anderson Chaves	(Brazil) Roque Júnior	(Peru) **Didier La Torre**						(Senegal) Cheikh Diamanka
Hokkaido Consadole Sapporo	(Brazil) **Mário Sérgio**	(Ghana) Francis Cann	(Ghana) Kinglord Safo	(Sierra Leone) Amadou Bakayoko	(South Korea) Park Min-gyu	(Spain) Jordi Sánchez	(Thailand) Supachok Sarachat		(South Korea) Kim Gun-hee
FC Imabari	(Brazil) Danilo Cardoso	(Brazil) Marcus Vinícius	(Brazil) **Patrick Verhon**	(Brazil) Vinícius Diniz	(Brazil) Wesley Tanque	(South Korea) Lee Young-jun			
Iwaki FC	(South Korea) Hyun Woo-bin	(South Korea) Joo Hyun-jin	(South Korea) **Kim Hyun-woo**						
JEF United Chiba	(Brazil) Carlinhos Júnior	(Brazil) Derek	(Brazil) Dudu Pacheco	(Spain) José Aurelio Suárez					
Júbilo Iwata	(Belgium) **Jan Van den Bergh**	(Brazil) **Gustavo Silva**	(Brazil) Matheus Peixoto	(Brazil) Ricardo Graça	(Thailand) **Poramet Arjvirai**				(Belgium) Jordy Croux (Brazil) Léo Gomes (Israel) Hassan Hilu (South Korea) Park Se-gi
Kataller Toyama	(Brazil) Gabriel Nascimento	(South Korea) Koh Bong-jo							
Mito HollyHock									
Montedio Yamagata	(Australia) Tom Heward-Belle	(Georgia (country)) Beka Mikeltadze							
Oita Trinita	(Brazil) Derlan	(Brazil) **Gleyson**	(Brazil) Matheus Pereira	(South Korea) Mun Kyung-gun					(South Korea) Kim Hyun-woo
RB Omiya Ardija	(Brazil) Arthur Silva	(Brazil) Gabriel	(Brazil) Mauricio Caprini	(Colombia) Fabián González	(Nigeria) Oriola Sunday				
Renofa Yamaguchi	(Brazil) **Alef Firmino**	(Netherlands) Nick Marsman	(South Korea) Choi Hyung-chan	(South Korea) Kim Byeom-yong					(Brazil) Sílvio
Roasso Kumamoto	(North Korea) Ri Thae-ha	(South Korea) Bae Jeong-min	(United States) Anton Burns						
Sagan Tosu	(Brazil) Cristiano	(Brazil) Jô	(Lithuania) Vykintas Slivka	(South Korea) **Lee Yoon-sung**					(Ghana) **Michael Quarcoo** (South Korea) Yang Han-been (Spain) Arnau Riera
Tokushima Vortis	(Brazil) Elsinho	(Brazil) Kaique	(Brazil) Lucas Barcellos	(Brazil) Thonny Anderson	(Nigeria) Lawrence Izuchukwu				(Brazil) João Victor
V-Varen Nagasaki	(Brazil) **Diego Pituca**	(Brazil) Edigar Junio	(Brazil) Eduardo	(Brazil) Emerson Deocleciano	(Brazil) **Gabriel Tigrão**	(Brazil) Matheus Jesus	(Spain) Juanma		(Brazil) Marcos Guilherme
Vegalta Sendai	(Brazil) Eron	(Brazil) Gustavo Santos	(Brazil) Mateus Moraes						
Ventforet Kofu	(Brazil) Eduardo Mancha	(Brazil) Matheus Leiria	(Brazil) **Mikael Doka**	(Brazil) **Neemias**	(Brazil) Renato Augusto	(Brazil) **Val**	(South Korea) Lee Min-ki	(South Korea) Taiga Son	

== League table ==
Pos	Team	Pld	W	D	L	GF	GA	GD	Pts	Promotion or relegation
1	Mito HollyHock (C, P)	38	20	10	8	55	34	+21	70	Promotion to the J1 League
2	V-Varen Nagasaki (P)	38	19	13	6	63	44	+19	70	Promotion to the J1 League
3	JEF United Chiba (O, P)	38	20	9	9	56	34	+22	69	Qualification for the promotion play-offs
4	Tokushima Vortis	38	18	11	9	45	24	+21	65	Qualification for the promotion play-offs
5	Júbilo Iwata	38	19	7	12	59	51	+8	64	Qualification for the promotion play-offs
6	RB Omiya Ardija	38	18	9	11	60	39	+21	63	Qualification for the promotion play-offs
7	Vegalta Sendai	38	16	14	8	47	36	+11	62	
8	Sagan Tosu	38	16	10	12	46	43	+3	58	
9	Iwaki FC	38	15	11	12	55	44	+11	56	
10	Montedio Yamagata	38	15	8	15	58	54	+4	53	
11	FC Imabari	38	13	14	11	46	46	0	53	
12	Hokkaido Consadole Sapporo	38	16	5	17	50	63	−13	53	
13	Ventforet Kofu	38	11	11	16	37	45	−8	44	
14	Blaublitz Akita	38	11	10	17	43	59	−16	43	
15	Fujieda MYFC	38	9	12	17	41	50	−9	39	
16	Oita Trinita	38	8	14	16	27	44	−17	38	
17	Kataller Toyama	38	9	10	19	34	49	−15	37	
18	Roasso Kumamoto (R)	38	9	10	19	41	57	−16	37	Relegation to the J3 League
19	Renofa Yamaguchi (R)	38	7	15	16	36	47	−11	36	Relegation to the J3 League
20	Ehime FC (R)	38	3	13	22	35	71	−36	22	Relegation to the J3 League

Source: Meiji Yasuda J2 League, J.League Data Site
Rules for classification: 1) Points; 2) Goal difference; 3) Goals scored; 4) Head-to-head points; 5) Head-to-head goal difference; 6) Head-to-head goal scored; 7) Fair-play points.
(C) Champions; (O) Play-off winners; (P) Promoted; (R) Relegated

== Play-offs ==
The usual format was applied in the 2025 season. Promotion play-offs, officially called the Meiji Yasuda Road To J1 Play-offs 2025 (Note: On the official J.League English website, it is listed as J1 Promotion Play-Offs) (Japanese: 明治安田J1昇格プレーオフ2025), was held from the semi-finals, where the match-ups were previously semi-determined. Based on the J2 placements at the end of the regular season, the third-placed team played against the sixth-placed, while the fourth-placed team played against the fifth-placed. The winners of the semi-finals played the final, with the winners promoted to the J1.

If a match was tied in the play-offs, the team with the higher rank won. The rank order was: J2's third, fourth, fifth, and sixth-placed teams.

Semi-finals
3	JEF United Chiba	4
6	RB Omiya Ardija	3
4	Tokushima Vortis	1
5	Júbilo Iwata	1

Final
3	JEF United Chiba	1
4	Tokushima Vortis	0

=== Semi-finals ===
7 December 2025
13:00 JST

JEF United Chiba	4–3	RB Omiya Ardija
Carlinhos JR 71'; D. Pacheco 77'; M. Himeno 83'; T. Kawano 87'	Report	T.Izumi 20'; K. Sekiguchi 32'; A. Silva 48'

Fukuda Denshi Arena, Chiba
Attendance: 17.074
Referee: Yusuke Ohashi

7 December 2025
13:10 JST

Tokushima Vortis	1–1	Júbilo Iwata
T. Anderson 82'	Report	R. Sato 24'

Pocarisweat Stadium, Naruto, Tokushima
Attendance: 11,387
Referee: Koji Takasaki

=== Final ===
13 December 2025
13:05 JST

JEF United Chiba	1–0	Tokushima Vortis
Carlinhos 69'	Report

Fukuda Denshi Arena, Chiba
Attendance: 17 634
Referee: Atsushi Kamimura

== Season statistics ==
=== Top scorers ===
Rank	Player	Club	Goals
1	(Brazil) Matheus Jesus	V-Varen Nagasaki	19
2	(Brazil) Marcus Índio	FC Imabari	17
3	(Brazil) Lucas Barcellos	Tokushima Vortis	14
4	(Japan) Arata Watanabe	Mito HollyHock	13
5	(Japan) Akira Silvano Disaro	Montedio Yamagata	11
5	(Brazil) Caprini	RB Omiya Ardija	11
7	(Japan) Ren Komatsu	Blaublitz Akita	10
7	(Japan) Tomoki Takamine	Hokkaido Consadole Sapporo	10
7	(Japan) Yuta Goke	Vegalta Sendai	10
7	(Japan) Daichi Ishikawa	JEF United Chiba	10
7	(Brazil) Carlinhos Júnior	JEF United Chiba	10
7	(Brazil) Matheus Peixoto	Júbilo Iwata	10
7	(Japan) Ota Yamamoto	Renofa Yamaguchi	10
7	(Japan) Ryo Shiohama	Roasso Kumamoto	10

== Awards ==
=== Monthly awards ===
Month	Manager of the Month		Monthly MVP		Goal of the Month		Young Player of the Month		Save of the Month		References
Month	Manager	Club	Player	Club	Player	Club	Player	Club	Player	Club	References
February/March	(Japan) Yoshiyuki Kobayashi	JEF United Chiba	(Japan) Ren Komatsu	Blaublitz Akita	(Japan) Akira Silvano Disaro	Montedio Yamagata	(Japan) Rion Ichihara	RB Omiya Ardija	(Japan) Tomoki Tagawa	Kataller Toyama	
April	(Japan) Yoshiro Moriyama	Vegalta Sendai	(Japan) Arata Watanabe	Mito HollyHock	(Japan) Issei Takahashi	JEF United Chiba	(Japan) Ota Yamamoto	Renofa Yamaguchi	(Japan) Taro Hamada	Oita Trinia	
May	(Japan) Naoki Mori	Mito HollyHock	(Japan) Arata Watanabe	Mito HollyHock	(Japan) Shunsuke Saito	Mito HollyHock	(Japan) Taisei Abe	V-Varen Nagasaki	(Japan) Takashi Kasahara	RB Omiya Ardija	
June	(Japan) Yoshiro Moriyama	Vegalta Sendai	(Japan) Tomoki Takamine	Consadole Sapporo	(Japan) Naoki Kumata	Iwaki FC	(Japan) Keito Kumashiro	Roasso Kumamoto	(Japan) Akihiro Hayashi	Vegalta Sendai	
July	(Japan) Naoki Mori	Mito HollyHock	(Japan) Shunsuke Saito	Mito HollyHock	(Japan) Chihiro Konagaya	Roasso Kumamoto	(Japan) Nelson Ishiwatari	Iwaki FC	(South Korea) Mun Kyung-gun	Oita Trinita	
August	(Japan) Takuya Takagi	V-Varen Nagasaki	(Brazil) Matheus Jesus	V-Varen Nagasaki	(Japan) Shunsuke Saito	Mito HollyHock	(Japan) Yumeki Yomoyama	FC Imabari	(Spain) José Aurelio Suárez	JEF United Chiba	
September	(Japan) Yoshiro Moriyama	Vegalta Sendai	(Japan) Jun Nishikawa	Safain Tosu	(Japan) Shunsuke Saito	Mito HollyHock	(Japan) Shion Shinkawa	Sagan Tosu	(Japan) Masato Sasaki	Iwaki FC	
October	(Japan) Yuzo Tamura	Iwaki FC	(Brazil) Lucas Barcellos	Tokushima Vortis	(Japan) Akira Silvano Disaro	Montedio Yamagata	(Japan) Yuki Kajiura	FC Imabari	(Japan) Takashi Kasahara	RB Omiya Ardija	
November/December	(Japan) Ryo Adachi	Kataller Toyama	(Japan) Shoma Doi	Montedio Yamagata	(Japan) Ayumu Kameda	Kataller Toyama	(Japan) Ota Yamamoto	Renofa Yamaguchi	(Japan) Masaaki Goto	V-Varen Nagasaki	

== See also ==
- 2025 Japanese Super Cup
- 2025 Emperor's Cup
- 2025 J.League Cup
- 2025 J1 League
- 2025 J3 League
- 2025 Japan Football League
- 2025 Japanese Regional Leagues
