= List of current J.League managers =

There are 60 association football teams in the top three divisions of Japanese football, all of which have a manager (sometimes given the title of head coach) unless the position is currently vacant. The J1 League is the top tier, and consists of 20 clubs, while the remaining 40 clubs are split into two 20 team divisions: the J2 League and the J3 League.

Ken Yoshida is currently the longest-serving manager in the top three divisions, having been appointed by Blaublitz Akita in December 2019.

This list includes every manager currently managing a club in the J.League in order of the date that they were appointed.

== Managers ==
As of 6 November 2026

Manager	Nation	Date of birth	Club	Division	From	Time as manager	Ref(s)
Ken Yoshida	Japan	1 March 1970	Blaublitz Akita	J2 League	16 December 2019	6 years, 330 days	
Naoki Imaya	Japan	18 June 1980	Tochigi City FC	J2 League	11 November 2021	5 years, 0 days	
Takashi Kiyama	Japan	18 February 1972	Fagiano Okayama	J1 League	14 December 2021	4 years, 332 days	
Go Kuroda	Japan	26 May 1970	FC Machida Zelvia	J1 League	24 October 2022	4 years, 18 days	
Yoshiyuki Kobayashi	Japan	27 January 1978	JEF United Chiba	J1 League	1 November 2022	4 years, 10 days	
Yoshiro Moriyama	Japan	9 November 1967	Vegalta Sendai	J2 League	27 November 2023	2 years, 349 days	
Kentaro Hayashi	Japan	29 August 1972	Gainare Tottori	J3 League	8 December 2023	2 years, 338 days	
Shuhei Terada	Japan	23 June 1975	Fukushima United FC	J3 League	13 December 2023	2 years, 333 days	
Yuji Okuma	Japan	19 January 1969	Tegevajaro Miyazaki	J2 League	19 December 2023	2 years, 327 days	
Yuki Richard Stalph	Japan	4 August 1984	SC Sagamihara	J3 League	26 June 2024	2 years, 138 days	
Tadaaki Hirakawa	Japan	1 May 1979	FC Ryukyu Okinawa	J3 League	24 November 2024	1 year, 352 days	
Ricardo Rodríguez	Spain	3 April 1974	Kashiwa Reysol	J1 League	11 December 2024	1 year, 335 days	
Toru Oniki	Japan	20 April 1974	Kashima Antlers	J1 League	12 December 2024	1 year, 334 days	
Shigetoshi Hasebe	Japan	23 April 1971	Kawasaki Frontale	J1 League	12 December 2024	1 year, 334 days	
Akio Kogiku	Japan	7 July 1975	Sagan Tosu	J2 League	14 December 2024	1 year, 332 days	
Rikizo Matsuhashi	Japan	22 August 1968	FC Tokyo	J1 League	21 December 2024	1 year, 325 days	
Ryo Adachi	Japan	2 July 1969	Kataller Toyama	J2 League	27 May 2025	1 year, 168 days	
Masateru Tsujita	Japan	3 August 1984	Zweigen Kanazawa	J3 League	3 June 2025	1 year, 161 days	
Takuya Takagi	Japan	12 November 1967	V-Varen Nagasaki	J1 League	20 June 2025	1 year, 144 days	
Akinobu Yokouchi	Japan	30 November 1967	Montedio Yamagata	J2 League	25 June 2025	1 year, 139 days	
Kiyotaka Ishimaru	Japan	30 October 1973	FC Gifu	J3 League	4 July 2025	1 year, 130 days	
Mitsunori Yabuta	Japan	2 May 1976	FC Osaka	J3 League	11 September 2025	1 year, 61 days	
Shuhei Yomoda	Japan	14 March 1973	Oita Trinita	J2 League	1 December 2025	345 days	
Tomohiro Katanosaka	Japan	18 April 1971	Roasso Kumamoto	J3 League	5 December 2025	341 days	
Takeshi Oki	Japan	16 July 1961	Ehime FC	J3 League	7 December 2025	339 days	
Yuzo Funakoshi	Japan	12 June 1977	Albirex Niigata	J2 League	7 December 2025	339 days	
Takayuki Yoshida	Japan	14 March 1977	Shimizu S-Pulse	J1 League	8 December 2025	338 days	
Michiharu Otagiri	Japan	2 September 1978	Renofa Yamaguchi	J3 League	8 December 2025	338 days	
Nobuhiro Ishizaki	Japan	14 March 1958	Matsumoto Yamaga	J3 League	8 December 2025	338 days	
Naoto Otake	Japan	18 October 1968	Kamatamare Sanuki	J3 League	8 December 2025	338 days	
Daisuke Sudo	Japan	25 April 1977	Yokohama FC	J2 League	8 December 2025	338 days	
Tetsu Nagasawa	Japan	28 May 1968	Shonan Bellmare	J2 League	10 December 2025	336 days	
Hiroki Shibuya	Japan	30 November 1966	Ventforet Kofu	J2 League	11 December 2025	335 days	
Kenta Kawai	Japan	7 June 1981	Hokkaido Consadole Sapporo	J2 League	11 December 2025	335 days	
Hiromasa Suguri	Japan	29 July 1976	Kagoshima United	J3 League	11 December 2025	335 days	
Tomoaki Makino	Japan	11 May 1987	Fujieda MYFC	J2 League	12 December 2025	334 days	
Michael Skibbe	Germany	4 August 1965	Vissel Kobe	J1 League	14 December 2025	332 days	
Masashi Oguro	Japan	4 May 1980	Nara Club	J3 League	14 December 2025	332 days	
Bartosch Gaul	Poland	5 October 1987	Sanfrecce Hiroshima	J1 League	16 December 2025	330 days	
Mihailo Petrović	Serbia	18 October 1957	Nagoya Grampus	J1 League	18 December 2025	328 days	
Shinji Kobayashi	Japan	24 August 1960	AC Nagano Parceiro	J3 League	31 March 2026	225 days	
Ranko Popović	Serbia	26 June 1967	Kyoto Sanga FC	J1 League	8 June 2026	156 days	
Takafumi Yoshimoto	Japan	13 May 1978	Tokushima Vortis	J2 League	8 June 2026	156 days	
Keiji Kuraishi	Japan	26 June 1982	Vanraure Hachinohe	J2 League	9 June 2026	155 days	
Makoto Kakuda	Japan	10 July 1983	Reilac Shiga	J3 League	9 June 2026	155 days	
Takahiro Shimotaira	Japan	18 December 1971	Kōchi United SC	J3 League	11 June 2026	153 days	
Tadahiro Akiba	Japan	13 October 1975	Júbilo Iwata	J2 League	15 June 2026	149 days	
Cho Kwi-jae	South Korea	16 January 1969	Urawa Red Diamonds	J1 League	16 June 2026	148 days	
Steve Corica	Australia	14 March 1973	Yokohama F. Marinos	J1 League	21 June 2026	143 days	
Narcís Pèlach	Spain	5 September 1988	RB Omiya Ardija	J2 League	24 June 2026	140 days	
Ryotaro Tanaka	Japan	13 March 1989	Giravanz Kitakyushu	J3 League	26 June 2026	138 days	
Pablo Machín	Spain	7 April 1975	Cerezo Osaka	J1 League	3 July 2026	131 days	
Tomokazu Myojin	Japan	24 January 1978	Gamba Osaka	J1 League	18 July 2026	116 days	
Kazuaki Tasaka	Japan	3 August 1971	Iwaki FC	J2 League	9 September 2026	63 days	
Mitsumasa Yoda	Japan	7 August 1977	Thespa Gunma	J3 League	14 September 2026	58 days	
Yoshikiyo Kuboyama	Japan	21 July 1976	FC Imabari	J2 League	21 September 2026	51 days	
Naoki Soma	Japan	19 July 1971	Tokyo Verdy	J1 League	8 October 2026	34 days	
Yoshimi Hamasaki	Japan	16 May 1974	Tochigi SC	J3 League	11 October 2026	31 days	
Naoki Mori	Japan	21 November 1977	Mito HollyHock	J1 League	26 October 2025	16 days	
Hiroshi Jofuku	Japan	21 March 1961	Avispa Fukuoka	J1 League	6 November 2026	5 days	

== See also ==
- List of J.League managers
