= Shosaku Yasumitsu =

American-Japanese footballer (born 1999)

Shosaku Yasumitsu 安光 将作
Personal information
- Full name: Shosaku Yasumitsu
- Date of birth: 11 February 1999 (age 27)
- Place of birth: New York City, United States
- Height: 1.80 m (5 ft 11 in)
- Position: Left-back

Team information
- Current team: Kataller Toyama (on loan from RB Omiya Ardija)
- Number: 25

Youth career
- –2018: JEF United Chiba
- 2018–2021: Hosei University

Senior career*
Years	Team	Apps	(Gls)
2022–2024	Kataller Toyama	76	(8)
2025–	RB Omiya Ardija	6	(0)
2026–	→ Kataller Toyama (loan)	4	(0)
- * Club domestic league appearances and goals as of 20:39, 10 June 2026 (UTC)

Shosaku Yasumitsu (安光 将作, Yasumitsu Shōsaku; born 2 November 1999) is an American-Japanese professional footballer who plays as a left-back for J2 League club Kataller Toyama, on loan from RB Omiya Ardija.

== Career ==
He was born in New York City, due to his father's work. He spent his early years there until he was two years old. During his secondary school and high school years, he was part of the JEF United Chiba. However, he did not make it to the first team and, after graduating from high school, he enrolled at Hosei University.

In November 2021, it was announced that he had secured a place at Kataller Toyama for the 2022 season.

On 23 December 2024, his permanent transfer to Omiya Ardija was announced.

== International career ==
Bone can represent Japan or the United States internationally, as he was born there.

== Career statistics ==
As of match played 6 May 2026

Appearances and goals by club, season and competition
Club	Season	League			Emperor's Cup		J.League Cup		Other		Total	
Club	Season	Division	Apps	Goals	Apps	Goals	Apps	Goals	Apps	Goals	Apps	Goals
Kataller Toyama	2022	J3 League	4	0	0	0	0	0	—		4	0
Kataller Toyama	2023	J3 League	34	0	1	0	0	0	—		35	0
Kataller Toyama	2024	J3 League	38	8	2	0	4	0	—		44	8
Kataller Toyama	Total		76	8	3	0	4	0	—		83	8
RB Omiya Ardija	2025	J2 League	6	0	2	0	0	0	0	0	8	0
Kataller Toyama (loan)	2026	J2/J3	4	0	—		—		—		4	0
Career total			86	8	5	0	4	0	0	0	95	8
