= Nukuri Station =

Railway station in Shimada, Shizuoka Prefecture, Japan

Nukuri Station 抜里駅
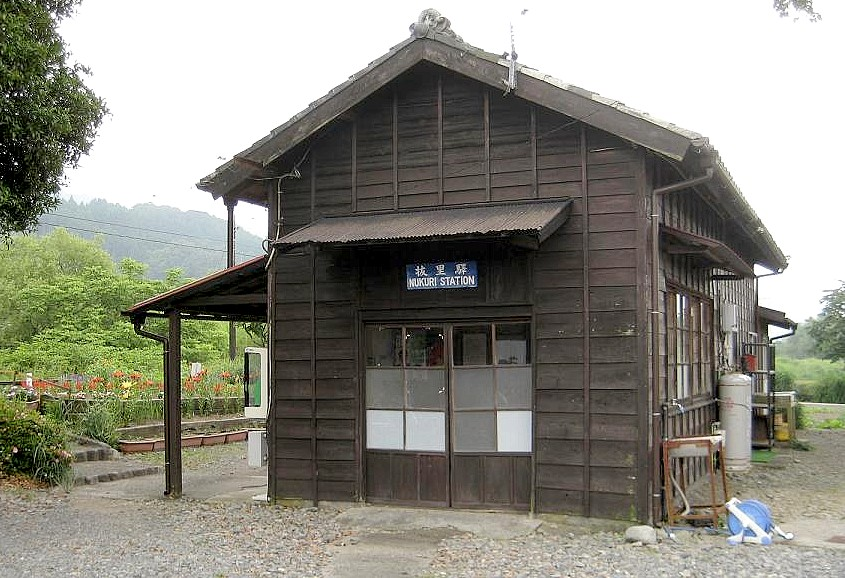
- Nukuri Station in October 2009

General information
- Location: Kawane-cho, Nukuri, Shimada-shi, Shizuoka-ken; Japan
- Coordinates: 34°57′12.21″N 138°5′15.58″E
- Operator: Ōigawa Railway
- Line: ■Ōigawa Main Line
- Distance: 18.8 kilometers from Kanaya
- Platforms: 1 side platform

Other information
- Status: Staffed

History
- Opened: July 16, 1930

Passengers
- FY2017: 8 daily
Location
- Location within Shizuoka Prefecture Location within Japan

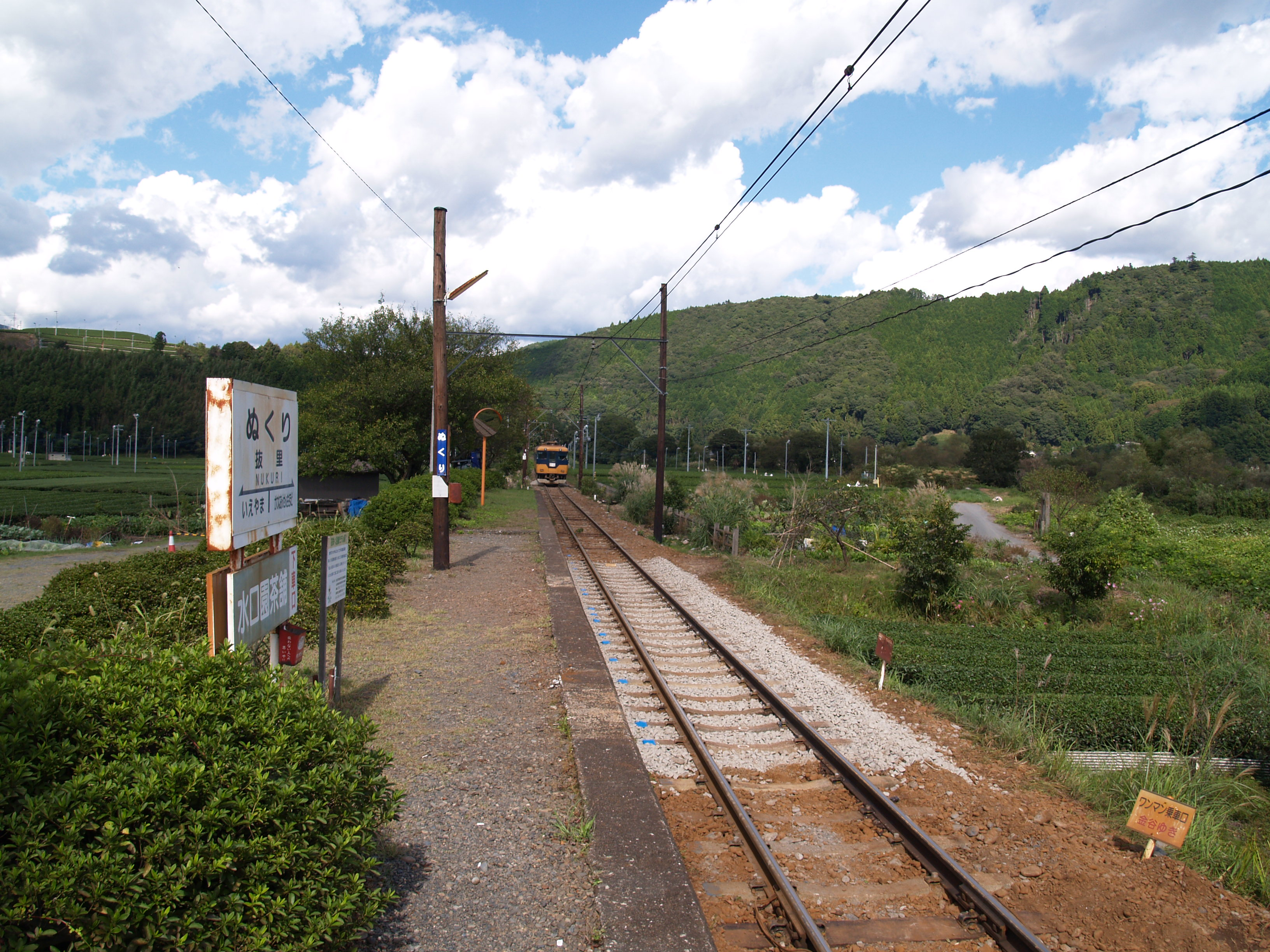
Platform

Nukuri Station (抜里駅, Nukuri-eki) is a railway station in the city of Shimada, Shizuoka Prefecture, Japan, operated by the Ōigawa Railway. Its location was formerly the town of Kawane, which was merged into Shimada in 2008.

== Lines ==
Nukuri Station is on the Ōigawa Main Line and is 18.8 from the terminus of the line at Kanaya Station.

== Station layout ==
The station has a single side platform, with a rustic wooden station building.

== Adjacent stations ==
«	Service	»
Ōigawa Railway
Ōigawa Main Line
SL Express: Does not stop at this station
Ieyama	Local	Kawaneonsen-Sasamado

== Station history ==
Nukuri Station was one of the original stations of the Ōigawa Main Line, and was opened on July 16, 1930.

== Passenger statistics ==
In fiscal 2017, the station was used by an average of 8 passengers daily (boarding passengers only).

== Surrounding area ==
- Oi River
- Japan National Route 473

== See also ==
- List of railway stations in Japan
