= Kawane =

Kawane may refer to:

- Kawane, Shizuoka, town in Japan
- Kawane, Senegal, village in Senegal, in the Kataba Arrondissement
- 9033 Kawane, minor planet
