= List of J.League managers =

This is a list of J. League managers. Some of these managers were appointed as caretaker managers prior to being given a permanent position.

== Former managers ==
- (Sweden) Jan Jönsson - Shimizu S-Pulse (2018–19)
- (Argentina) Osvaldo Ardiles - Shimizu S-Pulse (1996–98), Yokohama F. Marinos (2000–01), Tokyo Verdy 1969 (2003–05)
- (Brazil) Paulo Autuori - Kashima Antlers (2006)
- (Brazil) Nelsinho Baptista - Verdy Kawasaki (1994–95), Nagoya Grampus Eight (2003–05)
- (England) Stuart Baxter - Sanfrecce Hiroshima (1992–93), Vissel Kobe (1995–97, 2006)
- (Brazil) José Oscar Bernardi - Kyoto Purple Sanga (1995–96)
- (Germany) Guido Buchwald - Urawa Red Diamonds (2004–06)
- (Brazil) João Carlos - Kashima Antlers (1996–98), Nagoya Grampus Eight (1999–01), Cerezo Osaka (2001), Consadole Sapporo (2003)
- (Brazil) Toninho Cerezo - Kashima Antlers (2000–05)
- (Uruguay) Hugo Fernandez - Consadole Sapporo (1997–98)
- (Spain) Benito Floro - Vissel Kobe (1998)
- (Brazil) Alexandre Gallo - FC Tokyo (2006)
- (Czech Republic) Ivan Hašek - Vissel Kobe (2004)
- (Germany) Sigfried Held - Gamba Osaka (1995)
- (Netherlands) Wim Jansen - Sanfrecce Hiroshima (1995–96)
- (Japan) Kunishige Kamamoto - Gamba Osaka (1991–94)
- Shu Kamo - Yokohama Flügels (1991–94), Japan national football team (1995–97), Kyoto Purple Sanga (1999-00)
- (Germany) Horst Köppel - Urawa Red Diamonds (1997)
- (Brazil) Émerson Leão - Shimizu S-Pulse (1992–94), Verdy Kawasaki (1996), Vissel Kobe (2005)
- (England) Gordon Milne - Nagoya Grampus Eight (1994)
- Takeshi Okada - Japan national team (1997–98), Consadole Sapporo (1999–01), Yokohama F. Marinos (2003–06), Japan national team (2007–2010)
- (Netherlands) Hans Ooft - Japan national team (1992–93), Júbilo Iwata (1994–96), Kyoto Purple Sanga (1998), Urawa Red Diamonds (2002–03)
- (Germany) Holger Osieck - Urawa Red Diamonds (1995–96, 2007–08)
- (Bosnia and Herzegovina) Ivica Osim - JEF United Ichihara Chiba (2003–06), Japan national team (2006–07)
- (Japan) Ruy Ramos - Tokyo Verdy 1969 (2006–07)
- (Czech Republic) Pavel Řehák - Vissel Kobe (2005)
- (England) Steve Perryman - Shimizu S-Pulse (1998–00), Kashiwa Reysol (2001–02)
- (Spain) Carles Rexach - Yokohama Flügels (1998)
- (Brazil) Rivellino - Shimizu S-Pulse (1994)
- (Brazil) Joel Santana - Vegalta Sendai (2006)
- (Brazil) Luiz Felipe Scolari - Júbilo Iwata (1997)
- (Scotland) Eddie Thomson - Sanfrecce Hiroshima (1997–00)
- (Slovakia) Jozef Vengloš - JEF United Ichihara (2002)
- (Netherlands) Pim Verbeek - Omiya Ardija (1998–99), Kyoto Purple Sanga (2003)
- (Netherlands) Robert Verbeek - Omiya Ardija (2007)
- (Slovakia) Zdenko Verdenik - JEF United Ichihara (2001), Nagoya Grampus Eight (2002–03), Vegalta Sendai (2003–04)
- (Netherlands) Sef Vergoossen - Nagoya Grampus Eight (2006–07)
- (France) Arsène Wenger - Nagoya Grampus Eight (1995–96)
- (Portugal) Carlos Queiroz - Nagoya Grampus Eight (1996–97)
- Masakuni Yamamoto - Japan national under-23 football team (2002–04), Júbilo Iwata (2004–06)
- (Romania) Nicolae Zamfir - JEF United Ichihara (1999–00)

== See also ==
- List of current J.League managers
