= Park Min-gyu (footballer) =

South Korean footballer (born 1995)

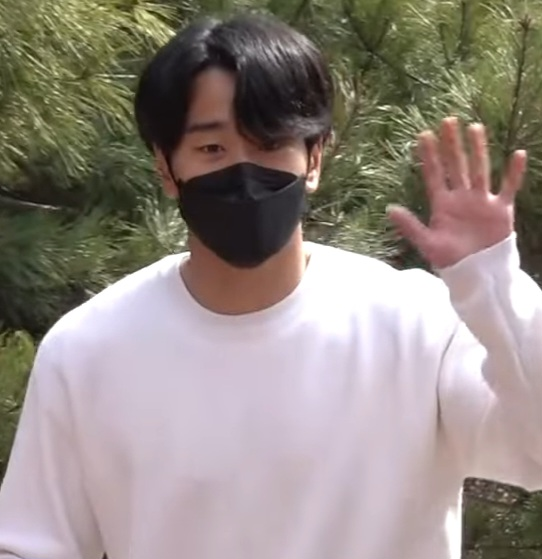

Personal information
- Date of birth: 10 August 1995 (age 31)
- Place of birth: Seoul, South Korea
- Height: 1.77 m (5 ft 9 1/2 in)
- Position: Full-back

Team information
- Current team: Hokkaido Consadole Sapporo
- Number: 3

Youth career
- 2014–2016: FC Seoul

Senior career*
Years	Team	Apps	(Gls)
2017–2019	FC Seoul	1	(0)
2019	→ Daejeon Citizen (loan)	15	(0)
2020–2024	Suwon FC	60	(1)
2021	→ Busan IPark (loan)	31	(0)
2023–2024	→ Gimcheon Sangmu (draft)	40	(1)
2024–	Hokkaido Consadole Sapporo	51	(1)

International career^{‡}
2011	South Korea U17	3	(0)
2013–2014	South Korea U20	12	(0)
- * Club domestic league appearances and goals as of 13 August 2026 ‡ National team caps and goals as of 14 March 2022

- Park Min-gyu
- Hangul: 박민규
- Hanja: 朴玟奎
- RR: Bak Mingyu
- MR: Pak Min'gyu

Park Min-gyu (Korean: 박민규; born 10 August 1995) is a South Korean footballer currently playing as a full-back for Hokkaido Consadole Sapporo.

== Club career ==
=== FC Seoul ===
On 26 December 2016, Park joined FC Seoul. On 11 April 2017, he made his debut in the AFC Champions League vs Western Sydney Wanderers.

=== Loan to Daejeon Citizen ===
On 19 July 2019, Park joined Daejeon Citizen on loan.

=== Suwon FC ===
On 14 January 2020, Park joined Suwon FC. He scored his first league goal against Gangwon on 15 August 2022, scoring in the 68th minute.

=== Loan to Busan IPark ===
On 25 January 2021, Park joined Busan IPark on loan.

=== Loan to Gimcheon Sangmu ===
On 1 December 2022, Park joined Gimcheon Sangmu on loan due to military service.

=== Hokkaido Consadole Sapporo ===
On 16 July 2024, Park joined Hokkaido Consadole Sapporo.

== Career statistics ==
=== Club ===
As of 4 October 2025

Club	Season	League			Cup		League Cup		Other		Total	
Club	Season	Division	Apps	Goals	Apps	Goals	Apps	Goals	Apps	Goals	Apps	Goals
FC Seoul	2017	K League 1	1	0	0	0	—		2 (Note: Appearances in AFC Champions League)	0	3	0
FC Seoul	2018	K League 1	0	0	0	0	—		—		0	0
Daejeon Citizen (loan)	2019	K League 2	15	0	0	0	—		—		15	0
Suwon FC	2020	K League 2	25	0	0	0	—		1 (Note: Appearances in K League promotion play-offs)	0	26	0
Busan IPark (loan)	2021	K League 2	31	0	2	0	—		—		33	0
Suwon FC	2022	K League 1	35	1	0	0	—		—		35	1
Gimcheon Sangmu (draft)	2023	K League 2	25	1	1	0	—		—		26	1
Gimcheon Sangmu (draft)	2024	K League 1	15	0	0	0	—		—		15	0
Hokkaido Consadole Sapporo	2024	J1 League	14	0	0	0	2	0	—		16	0
Hokkaido Consadole Sapporo	2025	J2 League	14	1	0	0	1	0	—		15	1
Career total			175	3	3	0	3	0	3	0	184	3

== Honours ==
- K League 2: 2023
