= Toshiya Miura =

Japanese footballer and manager

Toshiya Miura 三浦 俊也
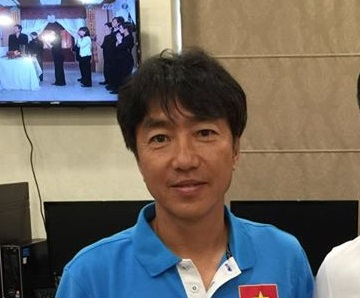
- Miura in 2015

Personal information
- Full name: Toshiya Miura
- Date of birth: 16 July 1963 (age 63)
- Place of birth: Kamaishi, Iwate, Japan

Youth career
- 1979–1981: Kamaishi Minami High School
- 1982–1985: Komazawa University

Senior career*
Years	Team	Apps	(Gls)
- Morioka Zebra
- Nippon Steel Kamaishi

Managerial career
- 1997: Brummell Sendai
- 1998: Mito HollyHock
- 2000–2001: Omiya Ardija
- 2004–2006: Omiya Ardija
- 2007–2008: Hokkaido Consadole Sapporo
- 2009–2010: Vissel Kobe
- 2011: Ventforet Kofu
- 2014–2016: Vietnam U23
- 2014–2016: Vietnam
- 2017–2018: Hồ Chí Minh City
- 2022: FC Gifu
- 2023: Thailand U20
- * Club domestic league appearances and goals

Toshiya Miura (三浦 俊也, Miura Toshiya; born July 16, 1963) is a Japanese football manager and former player. He was most recently the head coach of Thailand U20.

== Playing career ==
Miura was born in Kamaishi on July 16, 1963. After graduating from Komazawa University, he played for his local club Morioka Zebra and Nippon Steel Kamaishi.

== Coaching career ==
=== Japan ===
In 1997, Miura became a coach for Brummell Sendai. In October, he managed the club at 1997 Emperor's Cup. In 1998, he signed with Mito HollyHock. From 2000 onwards, he managed J.League clubs Omiya Ardija (2000-2001, 2004–2006), Consadole Sapporo (2007-2008), Vissel Kobe (2009-2010), Ventforet Kofu (2011), and most recently, FC Gifu (2022).

=== Vietnam ===
On 10 May 2014, the Vietnam Football Federation appointed Miura as Vietnam national team manager after agreeing to a two-year contract. His first official competition was the 2014 AFF Suzuki Cup, in which he led the team to the semifinal when it was defeated by Malaysia.

On 31 March 2015, Miura became the first manager of Vietnam U-23 national team to qualify for the 2016 AFC U-23 Championship (Note that this is also only the 2nd edition of the tournament. It was held the 1st time in 2013 as AFC U-22 Championships) as the 3rd of the 5 best second-ranked teams in the qualification stage. Despite this early success, he started showing his limitations a year later with some disappointing performances against Thailand during the FIFA World Cup 2018 qualifications or Australia U23 and Jordan U23 during the AFC-U23 Championships. He has been then criticized by local coaches for being too conservative, suggesting that he continually asks his men to play tough, even against countries with players of superior physical shape and strength. His football style was therefore considered not suitable for small size Vietnamese players.

== Managerial statistics ==
As of match played 4 May 2022

Managerial record by team and tenure
Team	Nat	From	To	Record				
Team	Nat	From	To	G	W	D	L	Win %
Omiya Ardija	(Japan)	February 2000	December 2001	88	49	8	31	55.68
Omiya Ardija	(Japan)	February 2004	December 2006	135	62	21	52	45.93
Consadole Sapporo	(Japan)	February 2007	December 2008	90	32	19	39	35.56
Vissel Kobe	(Japan)	August 2009	September 2010	45	14	12	19	31.11
Ventforet Kofu	(Japan)	January 2011	August 2011	22	5	5	12	22.73
Vietnam	(Vietnam)	10 May 2014	28 January 2016	14	7	3	4	50.00
Vietnam U23	(Vietnam)	10 May 2014	28 January 2016	16	9	0	7	56.25
Ho Chi Minh City	(Vietnam)	5 January 2018	10 October 2018	26	7	6	13	26.92
FC Gifu	(Japan)	1 February 2022	5 May 2022	7	2	1	4	28.57
Thailand U20	(Thailand)	19 March 2023	19 October 2023	0	0	0	0	—
Career Total				443	187	75	181	42.21

== Honors ==
Omiya Ardija

- J2 League runner-up: 2004

Consadole Sapporo

- J2 League: 2007

Vietnam

- AFF Championship third place: 2014
- Southeast Asian Games bronze medal: 2015
