= Cristiano (footballer, born 2000) =

Brazilian footballer

Personal information
- Full name: Cristiano Claudinei Nogueira
- Date of birth: 20 February 2000 (age 26)
- Place of birth: Bauru, Brazil
- Height: 1.75 m (5 ft 9 in)
- Position: Central midfielder

Team information
- Current team: Atlético Goianiense

Youth career
- 2018: XV de Jaú
- 2019: Red Bull Brasil

Senior career*
Years	Team	Apps	(Gls)
2018	XV de Jaú	8	(0)
2020–2021	Red Bull Brasil	29	(2)
2021–2022	Red Bull Bragantino	3	(0)
2022	→ Água Santa (loan)	7	(0)
2023–2024	Água Santa	14	(0)
2023	→ Vila Nova (loan)	18	(0)
2024	Vila Nova	31	(0)
2025	Sagan Tosu	0	(0)
2026	Noroeste	8	(0)
2026–	Atlético Goianiense	0	(0)
- * Club domestic league appearances and goals as of 8 March 2026, 23:43 (UTC)

Cristiano Claudinei Nogueira (born 20 February 2000), simply known as Cristiano, is a Brazilian footballer who plays as a central midfielder and for Atlético Goianiense.

== Career ==
Cristiano was born in Bauru, São Paulo and made his senior debut with XV de Jaú in 2018. In the following year, he joined Red Bull Brasil and was initially assigned to the under-20 squad.

After the merger with Red Bull Bragantino, Cristiano played with the B-side before making his first team – and Série A – debut on 26 September 2021, starting in a 2–1 away loss to Fluminense. The following 13 January, he moved on loan to Água Santa.

Cristiano subsequently signed a permanent contract with Netuno, before being presented at Vila Nova on loan on 13 April 2023. Back to Água Santa for the 2024 season, he subsequently returned to Vila Nova on 19 March of that year, now in a permanent deal.

On 24 January 2025, Cristiano was abroad to Japan for the first time and official transfer to J2 relegated club, Sagan Tosu for 2025 season.

== Career statistics ==
=== Club ===
As of the start for 2025 season.

Club	Season	League			State League		Cup		League cup		Continental		Other		Total	
Club	Season	Division	Apps	Goals	Apps	Goals	Apps	Goals	Apps	Goals	Apps	Goals	Apps	Goals	Apps	Goals
XV de Jaú	2018	Paulista 2ª Divisão	—		8	0	—								8	0
Red Bull Brasil	2020	Paulista A2	—		13	1	—								13	1
Red Bull Brasil	2021	Paulista A2	—		16	1	—								16	1
Red Bull Brasil	Total		—		37	2	—								37	2
Red Bull Bragantino	2021	Série A	3	0	—		0	0	—		0	0	—		3	0
Água Santa	2022	Paulista	—		7	0	—								7	0
Água Santa	2023	Paulista	—		6	0	—								6	0
Água Santa	2024	Série D	0	0	8	0	2	0	—						10	0
Água Santa	Total		3	0	21	0	2	0	—						26	0
Vila Nova (loan)	2023	Série B	18	0	—										18	0
Vila Nova	2024	Série B	33	0	—										33	0
Sagan Tosu	2025	J2 League	0	0	—		0	0	0	0	—		0	0	0	0
Career total			54	0	58	2	2	0	0	0	0	0	0	0	114	2
