= Ota Yamamoto =

Japanese footballer (born 2004)

Personal information
- Date of birth: 4 June 2004 (age 22)
- Place of birth: Hiroshima, Japan
- Height: 1.75 m (5 ft 9 in)
- Position: Midfielder

Team information
- Current team: RB Omiya Ardija (on loan from RB Leipzig)
- Number: 18

Youth career
- –2022: Kashiwa Reysol

Senior career*
Years	Team	Apps	(Gls)
2023–2026	Kashiwa Reysol	16	(0)
2024	→ Tochigi SC (loan)	9	(1)
2025	→ Renofa Yamaguchi FC (loan)	33	(10)
2026	→ RB Omiya Ardija (loan)	19	(10)
2026–	RB Leipzig	0	(0)
2026–	→ RB Omiya Ardija (loan)	0	(0)
- * Club domestic league appearances and goals as of 29 May 2026

Ota Yamamoto (山本 桜大, Yamamoto Ota; born 4 June 2004), is a Japanese professional footballer who plays as a midfielder for J2 League club RB Omiya Ardija, on loan from Bundesliga club RB Leipzig.

== Early life ==
Yamamoto was born on 4 June 2004 in Hiroshima.

== Career ==
As a youth player, Yamamoto joined the youth academy of Japanese side Kashiwa Reysol and was promoted to the club's senior team in 2023, where he made sixteen league appearances and scored zero goals. Ahead of the 2025 season, he was sent on loan to Japanese side Renofa Yamaguchi FC, where he made thirty-three league appearances and scored ten goals.

Following his stint there, he was sent on loan to Japanese side RB Omiya Ardija in 2026, where he made nineteen league appearances and scored ten goals. Japanese news website Gekisaka wrote in 2026 that he "quickly adapted to Omiya's basic tactic of aggressive pressing" while playing for the club. During the summer of 2026, he signed for German Bundesliga side RB Leipzig, before returning to Japanese side RB Omiya Ardija on loan.

== Style of play ==
Yamamoto plays as a midfielder. Right-footed, he has received comparisons to Japan international Daichi Kamada.
