= Shunsuke Saito =

Japanese footballer (born 2005)

Shunsuke Saito 齋藤 俊輔
Personal information
- Date of birth: 26 April 2005 (age 21)
- Place of birth: Kanagawa, Japan
- Height: 1.74 m (5 ft 9 in)
- Position: Winger

Team information
- Current team: K.V.C. Westerlo
- Number: 38

Youth career
- SCH FC
- –2020: Yokohama F. Marinos
- 2021–2023: Toko Gakuen High School

Senior career*
Years	Team	Apps	(Gls)
2024–2026	Mito HollyHock	43	(9)
2026–	K.V.C. Westerlo	26	(6)

International career^{‡}
2024–2025	Japan U20	8	(1)
2026–	Japan	1	(0)
- * Club domestic league appearances and goals as of 1 June 2026 ‡ National team caps and goals as of 28 September 2026

Shunsuke Saito (齋藤 俊輔, Saitō Shunsuke; born 26 April 2005) is a Japanese professional footballer who plays as a winger for Belgian Pro League club K.V.C. Westerlo and the Japan national team.

== Club career ==
Saito moved to Mito HollyHock from Toko Gakuen High School in 2024. He scored 9 goals in 43 league games. In 2025, Mito HollyHock gained promotion to the J1 League. In January 2026, he moved to Belgian Pro League club K.V.C. Westerlo.

== Style of play ==
Saito is a versatile right-footed winger who mainly operates on the left flank. He is known for his direct dribbling, acceleration, and ability to cut inside onto his stronger foot to shoot or create chances. His performances in J2 League earned him the 2025 Best Goal award.
