= Naoki Mori (footballer, born 1977) =

Japanese manager

Naoki Mori 森 直樹
Personal information
- Full name: Naoki Mori
- Date of birth: November 21, 1977 (age 48)
- Place of birth: Saitama, Japan
- Height: 1.83 m (6 ft 0 in)
- Position: Defender

Team information
- Current team: Mito HollyHock (manager)

Youth career
- 1993–1995: Musashi Ogose High School
- 1996–1999: Dohto University

Senior career*
Years	Team	Apps	(Gls)
2000–2002	Cerezo Osaka	13	(0)
2003–2005	Mito HollyHock	81	(4)
Total		94	(4)

Managerial career
- 2024–2025: Mito HollyHock
- 2026–: Mito HollyHock
Medal record
Cerezo Osaka
Runner-up	Emperor's Cup	2001
- * Club domestic league appearances and goals

Naoki Mori (森 直樹, Mori Naoki; born November 21, 1977) is a Japanese professional football manager and former player who is the manager of J1 League club Mito HollyHock.

== Playing career ==
Mori was born in Saitama Prefecture on November 21, 1977. After graduating from Dohto University, he joined J1 League club Cerezo Osaka in 2000. He played mainly at centre back position, he did not play many games. The club were relegated to J2 League after the 2001 season. In 2003, he moved to J2 club Mito HollyHock. He became a regular player as centre back. However, his opportunity to play decreased in 2005 and he retired at the end of the 2005 season.

== Managerial career ==
On 9 May 2024, Mori was appointed manager of Mito HollyHock following the dismissal of Yoshimi Hamasaki.

== Club statistics ==
Club performance			League		Cup		League Cup		Total	
Season	Club	League	Apps	Goals	Apps	Goals	Apps	Goals	Apps	Goals
Japan			League		Emperor's Cup		J.League Cup		Total	
2000	Cerezo Osaka	J1 League	2	0	0	0	0	0	2	0
2001	Cerezo Osaka	J1 League	8	0	0	0	0	0	8	0
2002	Cerezo Osaka	J2 League	3	0	0	0	-		3	0
2003	Mito HollyHock	J2 League	38	2			-		38	2
2004	Mito HollyHock	J2 League	32	2			-		32	2
2005	Mito HollyHock	J2 League	11	0			-		11	0
Total			94	4	0	0	0	0	94	4

== Honours ==
=== Club ===
Mito HollyHock

- J2 League: 2025
