= Mun Kyung-gun =

South Korean footballer

Personal information
- Full name: Mun Kyung-gun
- Date of birth: February 9, 1995 (age 31)
- Place of birth: South Korea
- Height: 1.87 m (6 ft 1 1/2 in)
- Position: Goalkeeper

Team information
- Current team: Oita Trinita
- Number: 22

Youth career
- 2008–2009: Jangpyung Middle School
- 2009–2010: Changnyeong Middle School
- 2011–2013: Bokyung High School

College career
Years	Team	Apps	(Gls)
2014–2017	Kwangwoon University		

Senior career*
Years	Team	Apps	(Gls)
2017–2021	Oita Trinita	17	(0)
2021	Daegu FC	2	(0)
2021–2022	Ansan Greeners	3	(0)
2022	Jeju United	0	(0)
2022–2023	Gimcheon Sangmu	3	(0)
2024–	Oita Trinita	43	(0)
- * Club domestic league appearances and goals as of 16 August 2026

Mun Kyung-gun (Korean: 문경건; born February 9, 1995) is a South Korean football player who plays for Oita Trinita.

== Playing career ==
Mun joined J2 League club Oita Trinita in 2017. On June 6, 2018, he debuted against Renofa Yamaguchi FC in Emperor's Cup.

== Career statistics ==
Last update: 27 February 2019

Club performance			League		Cup		League Cup		Total	
Season	Club	League	Apps	Goals	Apps	Goals	Apps	Goals	Apps	Goals
Japan			League		Emperor's Cup		League Cup		Total	
2017	Oita Trinita	J2 League	0	0	0	0	-		0	0
2018	Oita Trinita	J2 League	0	0	1	0	-		1	0
Career total			0	0	1	0	0	0	1	0
