= Yuki Miyazawa (football manager) =

Japanese football manager

Yuki Miyazawa 宮沢 悠生
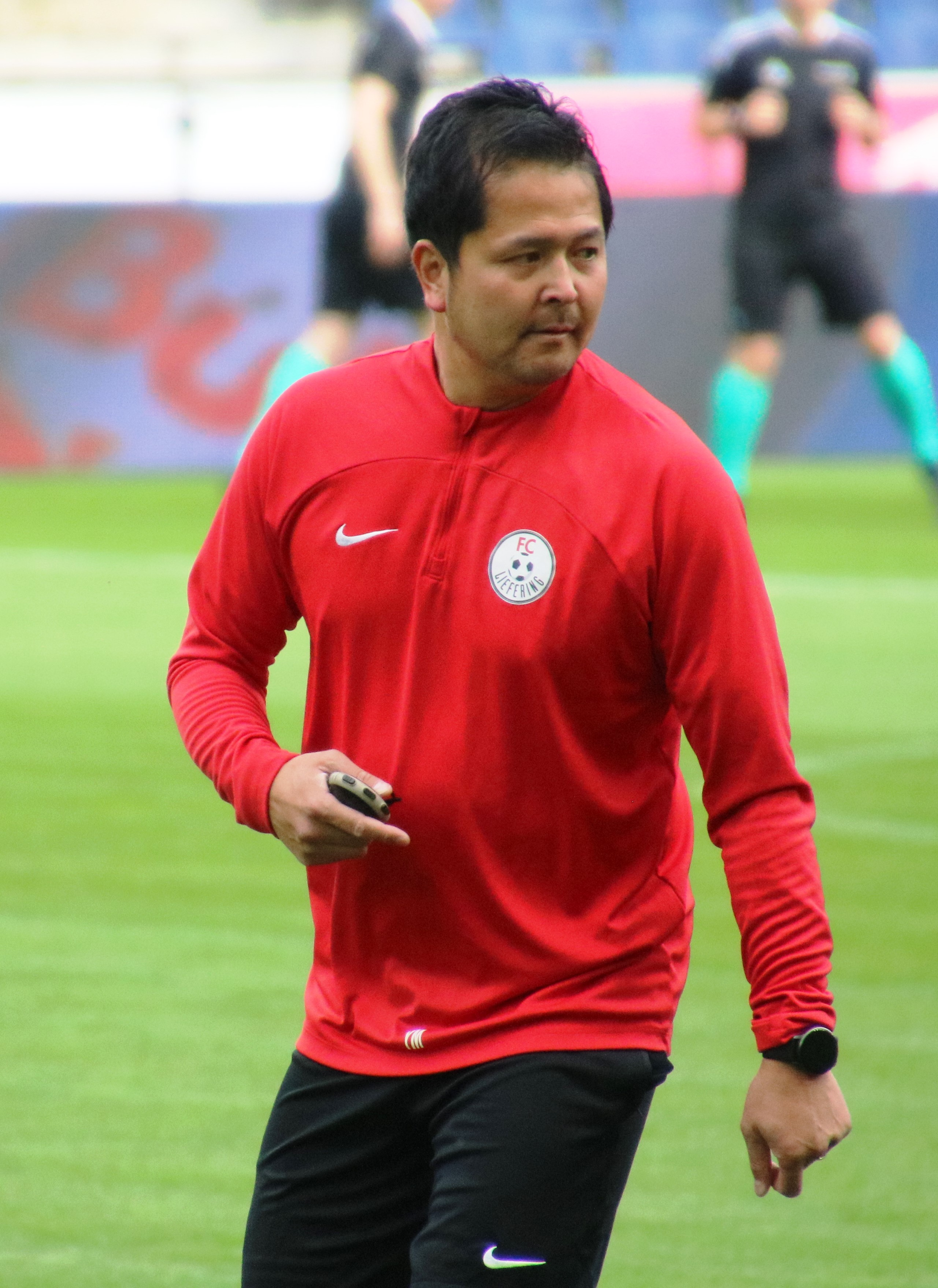
- Miyazawa in 2023

Personal information
- Full name: Yuki Miyazawa
- Date of birth: 28 August 1985 (age 41)
- Place of birth: Kyoto Prefecture, Japan

Team information
- Current team: RB Ōmiya Ardija (head of methodology)

Managerial career
- Years: Team
- 2025–2026: RB Ōmiya Ardija

Yuki Miyazawa (宮沢 悠生, Miyazawa Yuki; born 28 August 1985) is a Japanese professional football manager who is currently the head of methodology of J2 League club RB Ōmiya Ardija.

== Early career ==
After graduating from Kyoto Prefectural Katsura High School, Miyazawa attended Biwako Seikei Sport College, where he played football and majored in sports management. He graduated from the college in 2009.

Following his graduation, Miyazawa moved to Cologne, Germany, to pursue coaching further and gain international experience, believing the strength of German football would aid his professional understanding. Initially, he attended a language school and worked part-time, while also coaching at a local football club.

In 2011, when his visa was due for renewal, Miyazawa opted for a student visa rather than a working visa and enrolled at German Sport University Cologne. During this period, he gained extensive coaching experience, including coaching junior and junior youth players at FC Köln's partner club. He attended the university for four and a half years, although he didn't graduate.

While Miyazawa did not become a coach at FC Köln, the club supported him in obtaining the DFB A License, which he attained in 2014.

During his time in Cologne, by chance he had the opportunity to become an interpreter for FC Köln's Japanese players Kazuki Nagasawa and Yuya Osako. This was beneficial for Miyazawa as it provided him the opportunity to learn from manager Peter Stöger. While obtaining his A License, Miyazawa was approached by RB Leipzig to work as a scout. He turned down this offer but accepted a subsequent opportunity from Red Bull Salzburg to serve as an interpreter for Japanese international Takumi Minamino. Miyazawa accepted the role on the condition that the club would support him in gaining his S-Class coaching license in Japan, which he attained in 2019.

== Coaching career ==
In 2018, Miyazawa officially joined the Red Bull Salzburg academy as a coach, progressing from U15 assistant coach to the U18 assistant coach. He later served as the assistant coach for Salzburg's reserve team, FC Liefering, and also coached the Salzburg U18 team to victory in the 2024 Blue Stars/FIFA Youth Cup.

On 30 June 2026, RB Ōmiya Ardija appointed Miyazawa as their new head of methodology.

== Managerial career ==
Before moving to Germany, Miyazawa had hoped to return to Japan and contribute to strengthening Japanese football, which is why he fought to obtain his S-Class license in 2019. Following the dismissal of Tetsu Nagasawa, in September 2025 it was announced that Miyazawa would be appointed as manager of RB Ōmiya Ardija, another Red Bull subsidiary, in his first senior managerial role. Miyazawa took charge of 28 games with a 50% win rate, before being dismissed in May 2026, just before the final game of the J2/J3 100 Year Vision League.

== Managerial statistics ==
As of match played 30 May 2026

Managerial record by team and tenure
Team	Nat.	From	To	Record								Ref.
Team	Nat.	From	To	G	W	D	L	GF	GA	GD	Win %	Ref.
RB Ōmiya Ardija	(Japan)	24 September 2025	31 May 2026	28	14	3	11	61	45	+16	50.00	
Career total				28	14	3	11	61	45	+16	50.00	
