= Arata Watanabe =

Japanese footballer

Arata Watanabe 渡邉 新太
Personal information
- Full name: Arata Watanabe
- Date of birth: August 5, 1995 (age 31)
- Place of birth: Niigata, Japan
- Height: 1.71 m (5 ft 7 1/2 in)
- Position: Forward

Team information
- Current team: Mito HollyHock
- Number: 10

Youth career
- Masago SSS
- –2010: FC Igarashi
- 2011–2013: Albirex Niigata

College career
| Years | Team | Apps | (Gls) |
| 2014–2017 | Ryutsu Keizai University | | |

Senior career*
| Years | Team | Apps | (Gls) |
| 2017–2020 | Albirex Niigata | 92 | (22) |
| 2021–2024 | Oita Trinita | 103 | (15) |
| 2025– | Mito HollyHock | 49 | (17) |
- * Club domestic league appearances and goals as of 12 August 2026

Arata Watanabe (渡邉 新太, Watanabe Arata; born August 5, 1995) is a Japanese football player for Mito HollyHock.

== Career ==
While attending Ryutsu Keizai University, Albirex Niigata signed him as a special designated player in the 2017 season. In January 2018, Watanabe joined Albirex's top team and scored in four consecutive games during the 2018 season.

== Career statistics ==
Updated to end of 2018 season.

Appearances and goals by club, season and competition
| Club | Season | League | | | Emperor's Cup | | J.League Cup | | Total | |
| Club | Season | Division | Apps | Goals | Apps | Goals | Apps | Goals | Apps | Goals |
|---|---|---|---|---|---|---|---|---|---|---|
| Albirex Niigata | 2018 | J2 League | 35 | 10 | 2 | 0 | 3 | 0 | 40 | 10 |
| Career total | | | 35 | 10 | 2 | 0 | 3 | 0 | 40 | 10 |
