= Michael Quarcoo =

Ghanaian footballer (born 2004)

Personal information
- Date of birth: 24 October 2004 (age 22)
- Place of birth: Agona Swedru, Ghana
- Height: 1.78 m (5 ft 10 in)
- Positions: Defender; winger; forward

Team information
- Current team: Sagan Tosu (on loan from Capital-DF)
- Number: 38

Youth career
- –2024: Capital-DF

Senior career*
Years	Team	Apps	(Gls)
2024–	Capital-DF	3	(0)
2024–2025	→ Fortaleza (loan)	1	(0)
2025–	→ Sagan Tosu (loan)	0	(0)
- * Club domestic league appearances and goals as of 7 June 2025

Michael Quarcoo (born 24 October 2004) is a Ghanaian professional footballer who plays as a defender, winger, or forward for Sagan Tosu on loan from Capital-DF.

== Early life ==
Quarcoo was born on 24 October 2004 in Agona Swedru, Ghana and is a native of the city. The son of Leticia Appiah, he has a sister. Growing up, he worked for his grandmother's business.

== Career ==
As a youth player, Quarcoo joined the youth academy of Brazilian side Capital-DF and was promoted to the club's senior team ahead of the 2025 season. During April 2024, he was sent on loan to Brazilian side Fortaleza, where he made one league appearance and scored zero goals. Following his stint there, he was sent on loan to Japanese side Sagan Tosu.

== Style of play ==
Quarcoo plays as a defender, winger, or forward. Right-footed, he is known for his speed and strength.
