= Mito HollyHock =

Association football club based in Mito, Ibaraki prefecture in Japan

Mito HollyHock 水戸ホーリーホック
- Full name: Football Club Mito HollyHock Ibaraki
- Nicknames: Hollyhock, Tokugawa, Mitochan
- Founded: 1990; 36 years ago as Prima Aseno; 1994; 32 years ago as Mito Hollyhock
- Stadium: Mito Shinkin Bank Stadium; Naka, Ibaraki Prefecture, Ibaraki; K's denki Stadium Mito; Mito, Ibaraki
- Capacity: 12,000 (KS); 22,000 (Kasamatsu)
- Chairman: Kunio Numata
- Manager: Naoki Mori
- League: J1 League
- 2026: J1 League, 18th of 20
- Website: www.mito-hollyhock.net
Home colours	Away colours

Mito HollyHock (水戸ホーリーホック, Mito Hōrīhokku) is a Japanese professional association football club located in Mito, Ibaraki Prefecture. The club currently competes in the J1 League after clinching the 2025 J2 League title.

== History ==
The club was founded in 1990 as Prima Aseno Football Club by the factory workers of Prima Ham (a food company) in Tsuchiura. It changed its name to Prima Ham Tsuchiura and gained promotion to the Japan Football League after finishing as runner-up in the 1996 Regional League play-off. It merged with FC Mito (founded in 1994) and re-branded itself as Mito HollyHock before the start of the 1997 season when Prima Ham decided to discontinue its financial support to the club.

Mito's application to play in the inaugural 1999 season of J. League Division 2 was initially turned down due to financial instability, and low home attendance at their stadium. However, after finishing 3rd in the Japan Football League in 1999, and having an increasing stadium attendance, the club was invited into the J. League in 2000. During their time in the J2 League, the club finished through the mid-table, with their highest placement being 7th in 2003 and 2019.

=== First ever piece of silverware and promotion to the top flight ===
Mito ended the 2025 J2 League season with high determination and flying colours after managing to win the league which is also the club first major honours in their history. Despite tying with league runners-up V-Varen Nagasaki with 70 points total, Mito won the league winning one game more than V-Varen Nagasaki. Mito were then promoted to the J1 League for the first time, after securing a 2−0 victory against Oita Trinita on the final gameweek of the season and also ending a 25-year season spell in the second division.

== Team image ==
=== Name origin ===
Its nickname "HollyHock" derives from the flower which was the family crest of the Tokugawa clan who governed from Mito during the Edo period.

=== Others ===
Mito HollyHock also fields teams in e-sports and in Ice Hockey (Ibaraki Prefectural League).

== Stadium ==
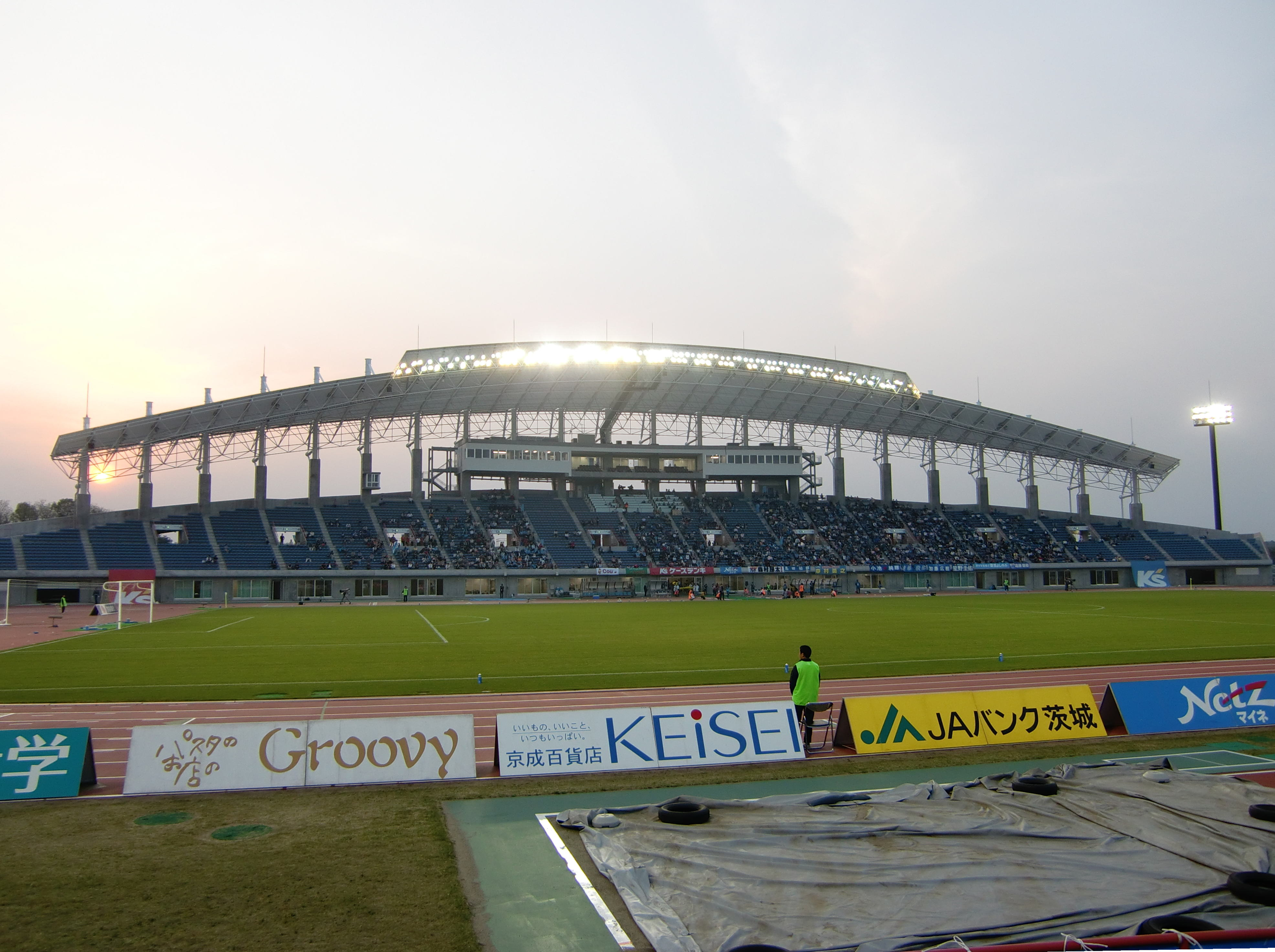
K's denki Stadium Mito

Mito used K's denki Stadium Mito as its club home ground from 2009 until 2026. Since their promotion to the J1 League for the 2026–27 season, they have moved to Mito Shinkin Bank Stadium as their main home ground due to its larger capacity in order to comply with J1 League regulations.

== Kit suppliers and shirt sponsors ==
=== Kit evolution ===
Home Jersey
2000 - 2002	2003 - 2004	2005	2006 - 2007	2008 - 2009
2010	2011	2012	2013	2014
2015	2016	2017	2018	2019
2020	2021 -	2022	2023	2024
2025	2026 -			

Away Jersey
2000 - 2002	2003 - 2005	2006 - 2007	2008 - 2009	2010
2011	2012	2013	2014	2015
2016	2017	2018	2019	2020
2021	2022	2023	2024	2025 -
2026 -

== Players ==
=== Current squad ===
As of 17 September 2026.

Note: Flags indicate national team as defined under FIFA eligibility rules; some limited exceptions apply. Players may hold more than one non-FIFA nationality.

No.	Pos.	Nation	Player
2	DF	JPN	Malick Fofana
3	MF	JPN	Koshi Osaki (vice-captain)
4	DF	JPN	Akinari Kawazura (on loan from Nagoya Grampus)
5	DF	JPN	Hiroshi Iwasaki
7	DF	JPN	Kazuma Okamoto
8	MF	JPN	Chihiro Kato
9	FW	JPN	Ryō Nemoto
10	FW	JPN	Arata Watanabe (captain)
11	MF	JPN	Yoshiki Torikai
14	MF	JPN	Mizuki Arai
15	DF	JPN	Yasuki Kimoto
16	DF	JPN	Yuri Tamura
17	DF	JPN	Kenta Itakura
18	FW	JPN	Kōtarō Uchino (on loan from Brøndby IF)
19	MF	JPN	Taishi Semba
20	MF	JPN	Yu Funabashi (on loan from Kashima Antlers)
21	GK	JPN	Shuhei Matsubara (vice-captain)

No.	Pos.	Nation	Player
22	FW	JPN	Kaito Taniguchi
24	MF	JPN	Kiichi Yamazaki
25	DF	JPN	Takumi Mase
27	GK	POL	Jakub Słowik (on loan from Yokohama FC)
29	FW	JPN	Keisuke Tada
30	MF	JPN	Jin Okumura
33	FW	BRA	Patryck (on loan from Madureira)
34	GK	JPN	Konosuke Nishikawa
37	GK	JPN	Minato Kamiyama
38	MF	BRA	Hugo (on loan from São Paulo)
39	MF	JPN	Hayata Yamamoto
41	MF	JPN	Kishin Shimatani
44	MF	JPN	Motoki Nishihara (on loan from Shimizu S-Pulse)
48	MF	JPN	Yuto Yamashita
50	DF	JPN	Rei Ieizumi
53	MF	JPN	Shota Yamashita
87	FW	JPN	Kishin Gokita ^{DSP}

=== Out on loan ===
Note: Flags indicate national team as defined under FIFA eligibility rules; some limited exceptions apply. Players may hold more than one non-FIFA nationality.

No.	Pos.	Nation	Player
51	GK	JPN	Ryusei Haruna (at FC Gifu)
89	DF	JPN	Kirato Sasaki (at Vanraure Hachinohe)
—	DF	JPN	Takeshi Ushizawa (at Iwaki FC)
—	GK	JPN	Uwabright Hayakawa (at Gainare Tottori)

No.	Pos.	Nation	Player
—	MF	JPN	Asuma Ikari (at Hannover 96 II)
—	FW	JPN	Yusei Uchida (at Azul Claro Numazu)
—	MF	JPN	Kota Saga (at YSCC Yokohama)

== Management and staff ==
Position	Name
Manager	(Japan) Naoki Mori
Assistant manager	(Japan) Yoshitaka Yasuda (Japan) Daisuke Kimori
Analyst & First-team coach	(Japan) Ryosuke Sato
Development coach	(Japan) Naoki Mori
Goalkeeper coach	(Japan) Takahiro Kono
Analyst	(Japan) Tsukasa Takahashi
Physical coach	(Japan) Yuki Nakamura
Chief trainer	(Japan) Tatsuya Doi
Trainer	(Japan) Takahiro Yamada
Physiotherapist	(Japan) Toru Yaguchi
Equipment manager	(Japan) Shunki Iwata (Japan) Yoshifumi Yoshida
Competent	(Japan) Hiromitsu Nonaka

== Honours ==
Mito HollyHock honours
Honour	No.	Years	Notes
Ibaraki Prefecture Division 1	2	1992, 1993	as Prima Ham Football Club
Ibaraki Prefecture Division 4 H Block	1	1994	as FC Mito
Ibaraki Prefecture Division 3 H Block	1	1995	as FC Mito
Kantō Soccer League	1	1995	as Prima Ham Football Club
Shakaijin Cup	1	1995	as Prima Ham Football Club
J2 League	1	2025	

== Managerial history ==
As FC Mito, Prima Ham (amateur era)

Manager	Period		Honours
(Germany) Gert Engels	1 July 1990	30 January 1993	
(Japan) Yuji Nakano	1 January 1992	31 December 1997	− 1995 Kantō Soccer League − 1995 Shakaijin Cup
(Japan) Toshiya Miura	1 February 1998	31 January 1999	
(Serbia) Branko Babić	1 January 2000	31 December 2000	
(Japan) Hiroshi Kobayashi	1 February 2001	16. July 2001	
(Japan) Masaaki Kanno	17 July 2001	31 January 2003	
(Japan) Hideki Maeda	1 January 2003	31 December 2007	
(Japan) Takashi Kiyama	1 February 2008	31 January 2011	
(Japan) Tetsuji Hashiratani	1 February 2011	7 June 2015	
(Japan) Takayuki Nishigaya	27 June 2015	31 January 2018	
(Japan) Shigetoshi Hasebe	1 February 2018	31 January 2020	
(Japan) Tadahiro Akiba	1 February 2020	31 January 2023	
(Japan) Yoshimi Hamasaki	1 February 2023	4 May 2024	
(Japan) Naoki Mori	9 May 2024	8 December 2025	− 2025 J2 League
(Japan) Daisuke Kimori	8 December 2025	26 October 2026	
(Japan) Naoki Mori	26 October 2026	Present	

== Season by season record ==
Champions	Runners-up	Third place	Promoted	Relegated

League													J. League Cup	Emperor's Cup
Season	Div.	Teams	Pos.	P	W (OTW / PKW)	D	L (OTL / PKL)	F	A	GD	Pts	Attendance/G	J. League Cup	Emperor's Cup
1997	Old JFL	16	16th	30	3 (1)	-	26	24	69	−45	10		Not eligible	2nd round
1998	Old JFL	16	14th	30	7 (1)	-	22	37	69	−32	23		Not eligible	3rd round
1999	New JFL	9	3rd	24	13 (3)	0	8 (0)	48	32	16	45	891	Not eligible	3rd round
2000	J2	10	9th	40	9 (6)	4	19 (2)	37	61	−24	43	2,021	1st round	3rd round
2001	J2	12	11th	44	5 (3)	4	26 (6)	41	93	−52	25	1,559	1st round	3rd round
2002	J2	12	10th	44	11	7	26	45	73	−28	40	2,739	Not eligible	3rd round
2003	J2	12	7th	44	15	11	18	37	41	−4	56	3,085	Not eligible	3rd round
2004	J2	12	9th	44	6	19	19	33	60	−27	37	3,773	Not eligible	4th round
2005	J2	12	10th	44	13	13	18	41	57	−16	52	3,334	Not eligible	4th round
2006	J2	13	10th	48	14	9	25	48	69	−21	51	3,017	Not eligible	3rd round
2007	J2	13	12th	48	8	10	30	32	70	−38	34	2,415	Not eligible	4th round
2008	J2	15	11th	42	13	8	21	52	70	−18	47	3,044	Not eligible	4th round
2009	J2	18	8th	51	21	10	20	70	79	−9	73	2,673	Not eligible	2nd round
2010	J2	19	16th	36	8	14	14	29	45	−16	38	3,608	Not eligible	3rd round
2011	J2	20	17th	38	11	9	18	40	49	−9	42	3,349	Not eligible	4th round
2012	J2	22	13th	42	15	11	16	47	49	−2	56	3,973	Not eligible	3rd round
2013	J2	22	15th	42	14	13	15	50	58	−8	55	4,630	Not eligible	3rd round
2014	J2	22	15th	42	12	14	16	46	46	0	50	4,734	Not eligible	3rd round
2015	J2	22	19th	42	10	16	16	40	47	−7	46	4,816	Not eligible	4th round
2016	J2	22	13th	42	10	18	14	45	49	−4	48	5,365	Not eligible	2nd round
2017	J2	22	14th	42	14	12	16	45	48	−3	54	4,931	Not eligible	2nd round
2018	J2	22	10th	42	16	9	17	48	46	2	57	4,938	Not eligible	3rd round
2019	J2	22	7th	42	19	13	10	56	37	19	70	6,087	Not eligible	3rd round
2020†	J2	22	9th	42	16	10	16	68	62	6	58	2,018	Not eligible	Did not qualify
2021†	J2	22	10th	42	16	11	15	59	50	9	59	2,696	Not eligible	2nd round
2022	J2	22	13th	42	14	12	16	47	46	−1	54	3,140	Not eligible	2nd round
2023	J2	22	17th	42	11	14	17	49	66	−17	47	3,726	Not eligible	3rd round
2024	J2	20	15th	38	11	11	16	39	51	−12	44	4,406	1st round	3rd round
2025	J2	20	1st	38	20	10	8	55	34	21	70	6,005	2nd round	1st round
2026	J1	20	18th	18	2	8	8	19	35	-16	18	8,367	N/A	N/A
2026-27	J1	20	TBD	38									TBD	TBD

Key

- Pos. = Position in league; P = Games played; W = Games won; D = Games drawn; L = Games lost; F = Goals scored; A = Goals conceded; GD = Goals difference; Pts = Points gained
- Attendance/G = Average home league attendance
- † 2020 & 2021 seasons attendances reduced by COVID-19 worldwide pandemic
- Source: J.League Data Site
