= RB Omiya Ardija =

Japanese football club

RB Ōmiya Ardija RB大宮アルディージャ
- Full name: RB Ōmiya Ardija
- Nicknames: Reddoboru (Red Bulls) (current); Risu (Squirrels) (former); Ardija
- Founded: 1969; 57 years ago as NTT Kantō SC
- Stadium: NACK5 Stadium Ōmiya (Omiya-ku, Saitama, Saitama)
- Capacity: 15,491
- Owner: Red Bull GmbH
- Chairman: Masashi Mori
- Manager: Narcís Pèlach
- League: J2 League
- 2025: J2 League, 6th of 20
- Website: rbomiya.com
Home colours	Away colours

RB Ōmiya Ardija (RB大宮アルディージャ, Arubi Ōmiya Arudīja) (Note: The club states that "RB" is an abbreviation of RasenBallsport (lit. "Lawn Ball Sports" in German); however, the initialism is not officially spelled out in the club name.) is a Japanese professional association football club based in Ōmiya, Saitama Prefecture. Its "hometown" (as designated by the league) is shared with neighbours Urawa Red Diamonds. The team currently play in J2 League, the Japanese second tier of professional football, after promotion from the third tier in 2024.

The club was known as Ōmiya Ardija (大宮アルディージャ, Ōmiya Arudīja), before club administration was taken over by Red Bull GmbH in late November 2024 who renamed the club.

The club has won 1 J2 League title and 1 J3 League title in their history.

== History ==
The team were founded in 1968 as NTT Saitama Soccer Selection in Urawa, Saitama and later known as the NTT Kantō Soccer Club in 1969. They were first promoted to the Japan Soccer League (JSL) Division 2 in 1987/88, and when the JSL folded, joined the former Japan Football League.

In 1998 the club was separately incorporated as NTT Sport Community K.K. based in Ōmiya to participate in the J. League. The name "Ardija" is a transcription of the Spanish language ardilla (squirrel) which is the mascot of Ōmiya and the park in which their home stadium is located.

Their matches against Urawa Red Diamonds have been called the "Saitama derby".

From 2005 to 2007, most of Ōmiya's home matches were held at Saitama Stadium 2002 and Urawa Komaba Stadium due to expansion works at their home ground. In October 2007 the expansion was complete. On November 11, the re-opening match was held as a J. League season match between the Ōmiya and Ōita Trinita (1–2).

Ōmiya competed in the J1 League following an immediate promotion in 2015 after being relegated in 2014. Ōmiya was relegated again following the 2017 season. They competed in J1 2005 and continued to remain until 2014, following promotion from J2 in 2004 as the second placed team.

In 2023, Ōmiya were relegated to J3 League after six seasons stint in second division due to worst performance and played third division football for the first time since 1993.

=== New ownership ===
On 15 February 2024, before the start of the season, Sports Nippon reported that Austrian energy drink maker Red Bull may buy a J.League club, and that Ōmiya Ardija was the leading candidate. On July 26 of the same year, the Nihon Keizai Shimbun reported that Red Bull had reached an agreement in principle to buy Ōmiya Ardija.

In August 2024, Omiya Ardija announced Red Bull as their new owner, after acquiring 100% of the club shares, formerly owned by NTT, becoming part of their multi-club ownership. This will be the first time that a foreign company has become the sole owner of a major Japanese professional sports team, including the J.League. Red Bull began by acquiring management rights to Austrian first division club Salzburg in 2005 and now owns six clubs: Leipzig in Bundesliga, New York Red Bulls in the United States MLS, Liefering in Admiral 2. Liga, Bragantino in Campeonato Brasileiro Serie A and Red Bull Brasil (now Red Bull Bragantino II) in the Sao Paulo State Championship. In the past, they also owned Red Bull Ghana in Africa and Omiya will be the eighth club they own.

NTT East will continue to support the company as a sponsor even after the transfer of shares.

On 13 October 2024, Ōmiya secured promotion to the J2 League after defeating Fukushima United 3–2, thus returning to the second tier after a one year absence. Six days later, Omiya secured the J3 League title with a 1–1 draw against Imabari in matchweek 33.

== Team image ==
Former logo, used until 2024

=== Crest ===
Ōmiya Ardija's original crest features a squirrel on the right, which is the animal of Omiya. On the left, there are 5 lines, which reference the historic roads that run through Omiya, including the famous Nakasendō, which runs to the Hikawa Shrine, right near Nack5 Stadium.

On 6 November 2024, Ōmiya Ardija officially change crest and name to RB Ōmiya Ardija after being acquired by Red Bull GmbH from 2025. The club retained their colours but adopted a new logo which is identical to other Red Bull owned clubs.

The former nickname of Omiya is Risu, squirrel in Japanese.

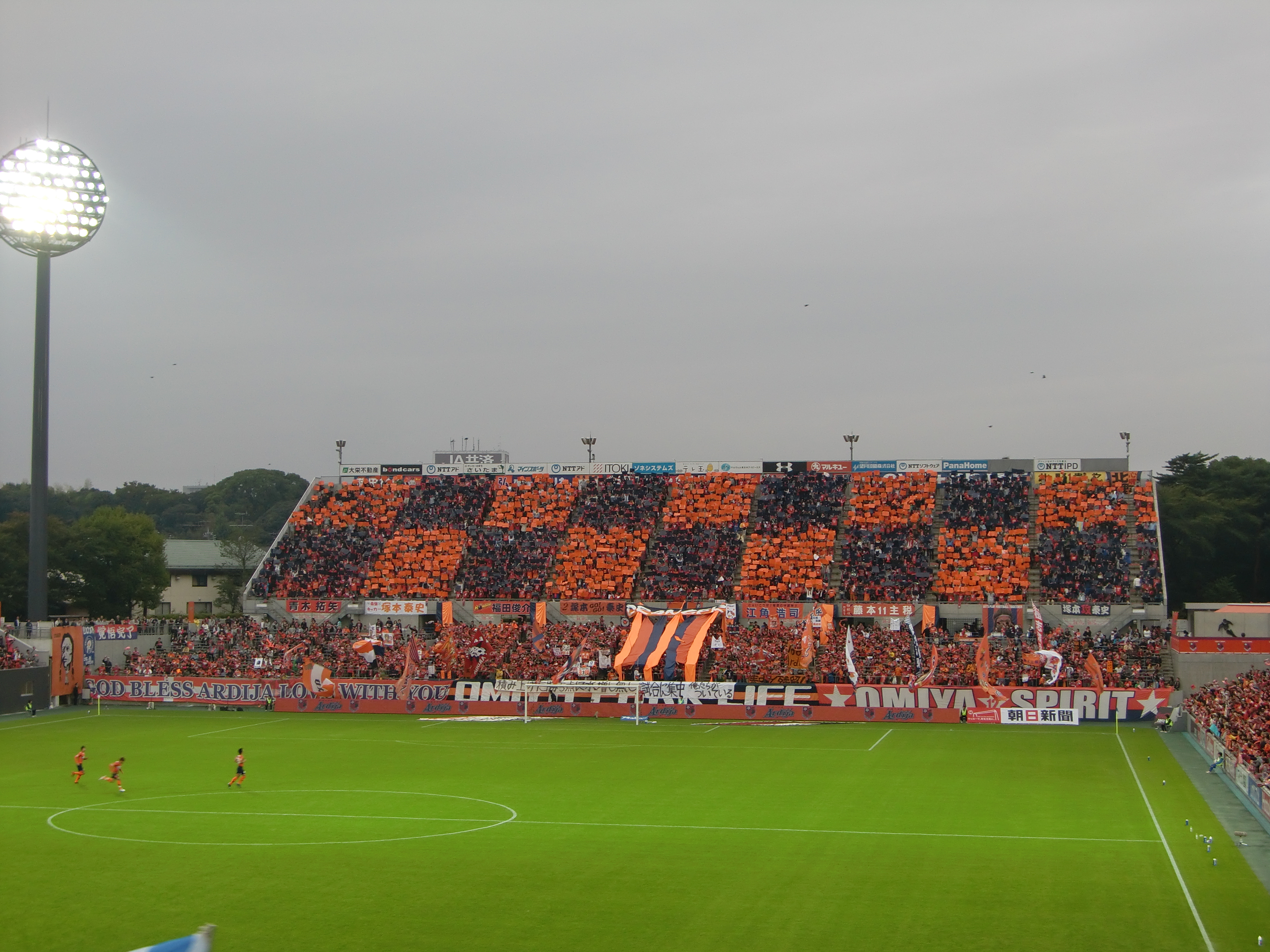
Ōmiya Ardija supporters

=== Mascots ===
Ōmiya Ardija had originally two squirrels as its mascots, named Ardi and Miya. Both wear the team kits. According to the club website, Miya is one size smaller than Ardi, being then, slightly shorter than him.

In 2025, the club has introduced a new mascot, a red bull with orange hair named Bululu. It coexists with Ardi and Miya and reflects the brand identity of the Red Bull ownership.

== Kit suppliers and shirt sponsors ==
=== Kit evolution ===
Home Kit – 1st
1999–2000	2001	2002 - 2003	2004 - 2005	2006
2007	2008	2009	2010	2011
2012	2013	2014	2015	2016
2017	2018	2019	2020	2021
2022	2023	2024	2025	2026/27 -

Away Kit – 2nd
1999 - 2000	2001	2002 - 2003	2004 - 2005	2006
2007	2008	2009	2010	2011
2012	2013	2014	2015	2016
2017	2018	2019	2020	2021
2022	2023	2024	2025	2026/27 -

Special Kits – 3rd
2018 3rd	2018; 20th anniversary	2023; 25th anniversary

== Players ==
As of 16 October 2026.

Note: Flags indicate national team as defined under FIFA eligibility rules; some limited exceptions apply. Players may hold more than one non-FIFA nationality.

No.	Pos.	Nation	Player
1	GK	JPN	Takashi Kasahara
3	DF	JPN	Hijiri Katō
5	DF	BRA	Gabriel
7	MF	JPN	Masato Kojima
8	MF	BRA	Kauã Diniz
9	FW	BRA	Carlinhos Júnior
10	FW	JPN	Yuta Toyokawa
11	FW	BRA	Caprini
13	DF	JPN	Osamu Henry Iyoha (on loan from Sanfrecce Hiroshima)
14	MF	JPN	Toya Izumi
15	MF	JPN	Kota Nakayama
16	MF	JPN	Gen Kato (on loan from Nagoya Grampus)
18	FW	JPN	Ota Yamamoto (on loan from (Germany) RB Leipzig)
19	DF	JPN	Yusei Ozaki (on loan from Vissel Kobe)
20	MF	JPN	Hajime Hidaka
21	FW	THA	Suphanat Mueanta
22	DF	JPN	Rikiya Motegi

No.	Pos.	Nation	Player
23	FW	JPN	Kenyu Sugimoto
24	GK	AUS	Tom Glover
25	DF	JPN	Yoshito Kumada
29	MF	JPN	Nash Taishi Higakure
33	MF	JPN	Soma Furukawa ^{DSP}
34	DF	JPN	Yosuke Murakami
37	DF	JPN	Kaishin Sekiguchi
40	GK	JPN	Ko Shimura
44	DF	JPN	Sunao Kidera
46	DF	JPN	Kyosuke Iseri ^{Type 2}
47	MF	JPN	Matthew Edward ^{Type 2}
49	FW	JPN	Jelani McGhee ^{Type 2}
50	GK	JPN	Manafu Wakabayashi
55	DF	JPN	Simon Yu Mendy ^{DSP}
77	MF	JPN	Yuzuki Kobayashi ^{Type 2}
88	DF	JPN	Ryūya Nishio

=== Out on loan ===
Note: Flags indicate national team as defined under FIFA eligibility rules; some limited exceptions apply. Players may hold more than one non-FIFA nationality.

No.	Pos.	Nation	Player
—	DF	JPN	Shunya Suzuki (at Tochigi SC)
—	MF	JPN	Yusuke Shimizu (at Gainare Tottori)
—	DF	JPN	Keita Fukui (at Ventforet Kofu)
—	MF	JPN	Kazushi Fujii (at Ventforet Kofu)
—	FW	NGR	Oriola Sunday (at (Australia) Sydney FC)

No.	Pos.	Nation	Player
—	MF	JPN	Raisei Abe (at Yokogawa Musashino FC)
—	FW	JPN	Mark Isozaki (at Yokogawa Musashino FC)
—	DF	JPN	Shosaku Yasumitsu (at Giravanz Kitakyushu)
—	MF	JPN	Taito Kanda (at (Germany) RB Leipzig U19)
—	MF	JPN	Takumi Matsui (at FC Gifu)

== Management and staff ==
As of 5 July 2026

Position	Staff
Manager	(Spain) Narcís Pèlach
Assistant manager	(Spain) Julián Marín
Assistant coach	(Spain) Andreu Fontàs
First-team coach	(Japan) Ryotaro Nakano (Japan) Yusuke Shimada
Goalkeeping coordinator	(Japan) Motoki Kawahara
Performance coordinator	(Japan) Akira Umeki
Physical coach	(Japan) Takuma Okumura
Strength & conditioning coach	(Japan) Yutaka Kato
Analyst coach	(England) Harrison Glew
Match analyst	(Japan) Yuki Fukuro (Japan) Ryogawa Matsuno
Chief manager	(Japan) Yosuke Hakamada
Technical staff	(Japan) Masashi Takami
Equipment manager	(Japan) Yuichi Goto
Equipment assistant	(Japan) Ryo Ito
Interpreter	(Japan) Yu Hoshide (Japan) Daiki Kimura (Japan) Leonardo Uehara (Thailand) Wongthawat Kuntarakornkiti
Chief athletic trainer	(Japan) Takafumi Kazama
Athletic trainer	(Japan) Kenichi Sekido
Physiotherapist	(Japan) Kihiro Hoshikawa (Japan) Ryohei Ikuta
Chief doctor	(Japan) Daisuke Iwasawa
Doctor	(Japan) Kosei Takahashi (Japan) Masayoshi Saito (Japan) Satoshi Tanaka

== Honours ==
RB Ōmiya Ardija Honours
Honour	No.	Years
Shakaijin Cup	1	1981
Regional League promotion series	1	1986
Saitama City Cup	2	2010, 2011
J2 League	1	2015
J3 League	1	2024
Saitama Prefectural Football Championship Emperor's Cup Saitama Prefectural Qualifiers	1	2024

== Managerial history ==
Manager	Tenure	
Manager	Start	Finish
(Netherlands) Pim Verbeek	1 January 1999	31 December 1999
(Japan) Toshiya Miura	1 February 2000	31 January 2002
(Netherlands) Henk Duut	22 December 2001	22 December 2002
(Japan) Masaaki Kanno	1 February 2003	13 October 2003
(Japan) Eijun Kiyokumo	10 October 2003	31 December 2003
(Japan) Toshiya Miura	1 February 2004	31 January 2007
(Netherlands) Robert Verbeek	1 January 2007	30 June 2007
(Japan) Satoru Sakuma	1 July 2007	31. December 2007
(Japan) Yasuhiro Higuchi	1 February 2008	31 January 2009
(South Korea) Chang Woe-ryong	1. February 2009	26 April 2010
(Japan) Jun Suzuki	24 April 2010	19 May 2012
(Japan) Takeyuki Okamoto (interim)	31 Mai 2012	10 June 2012
(Slovenia) Zdenko Verdenik	10 June 2012	11 August 2013
(Japan) Takeyuki Okamoto (interim) (2)	11 August 2013	20 August 2013
(Japan) Tsutomu Ogura	20 August 2013	31 December 2013
(Japan) Kiyoshi Okuma	1 February 2014	31 August 2014
(Japan) Hiroki Shibuya	31 August 2014	28 May 2017
(Japan) Akira Ito	29 Mai 2017	5 November 2017
(Japan) Masatada Ishii	6 November 2017	31 January 2019
(Japan) Takuya Takagi	1 February 2019	31 January 2021
(Japan) Ken Iwase	1 February 2021	25 May 2021
(Japan) Norio Sasaki	26 May 2021	9 June 2021
(Japan) Masahiro Shimoda	10 June 2021	26 May 2022
(Japan) Naoki Soma	28 May 2022	19 May 2023
(Japan) Masato Harasaki	19 May 2023	31 January 2024
As RB Ōmiya Ardija
(Japan) Tetsu Nagasawa	1 February 2024	24 September 2025
(Japan) Yuki Miyazawa	24 September 2025	31 May 2026
(Japan) Mitsuhiro Toda (caretaker)	1 June 2026	23 June 2026
(Spain) Narcís Pèlach	24 June 2026	Present

== Season by season record ==
Champions	Runners-up	Third place	Promoted	Relegated

League													J. League Cup	Emperor's Cup
Season	Div.	Teams	Pos.	P	W (OTW)	D	L (OTL)	F	A	GD	Pts	Attendance/G	J. League Cup	Emperor's Cup
as Ōmiya Ardija
1999	J2	10	6th	36	14 (4)	1	15 (2)	47	44	3	51	2,674	1st round	3rd round
2000	J2	11	4th	40	21 (2)	1	14 (2)	55	49	6	68	3,477	1st round	3rd round
2001	J2	12	5th	44	20 (6)	6	11(1)	73	43	30	78	3,864	1st round	1st round
2002	J2	12	6th	44	14	17	13	52	42	10	59	5,266	Not eligible	4th round
2003	J2	12	6th	44	18	7	19	52	61	−9	61	5,058	Not eligible	3rd round
2004	J2	12	2nd	44	26	9	9	63	38	25	87	6,108	Not eligible	5th round
2005	J1	18	13th	34	12	5	17	39	50	−11	41	9,980	Quarter final	Semi final
2006	J1	18	12th	34	13	5	16	43	55	−12	44	10,234	Group stage	5th round
2007	J1	18	15th	34	8	11	15	24	40	−16	35	11,465	Group stage	4th round
2008	J1	18	12th	34	12	7	15	36	45	−9	43	9,350	Group stage	5th round
2009	J1	18	13th	34	9	12	13	40	47	−7	39	13,707	Group stage	3rd round
2010	J1	18	12th	34	11	9	14	39	45	−6	42	11,064	Group stage	4th round
2011	J1	18	13th	34	10	12	12	38	48	−10	42	12,221	2nd round	2nd round
2012	J1	18	13th	34	11	11	12	38	45	−7	44	10,637	Group stage	4th round
2013	J1	18	14th	34	14	3	17	45	48	−3	45	11,138	Group stage	2nd round
2014	J1	18	16th	34	9	8	17	44	60	−16	35	10,811	Group stage	Quarter final
2015	J2	22	1st	42	26	8	8	72	37	35	86	9,490	Not eligible	3rd round
2016	J1	18	5th	34	15	11	8	41	36	5	56	11,814	Quarter final	Semi final
2017	J1	18	18th	34	5	10	19	28	60	−32	25	11,464	Group stage	Quarter final
2018	J2	22	5th	42	21	8	13	65	48	17	71	9,224	Not eligible	3rd round
2019	J2	22	3rd	42	20	15	7	62	40	22	75	9,478	Not eligible	3rd round
2020 †	J2	22	15th	42	14	11	17	43	52	−9	53	2,515	Not eligible	Did not qualify
2021 †	J2	22	16th	42	9	15	18	51	56	−5	42	4,311	Not eligible	2nd round
2022	J2	22	19th	42	10	13	19	48	64	−16	43	5,272	Not eligible	3rd round
2023	J2	22	21st	42	11	6	25	37	71	−49	39	6,862	Not eligible	3rd round
2024	J3	20	1st	38	25	10	3	72	32	40	85	7,472	2nd round	2nd round
as RB Ōmiya Ardija
2025	J2	20	6th	38	18	9	11	60	39	21	63	11,315	2nd round	1st round
2026	J2	40	15th	18	9	2	7	38	28	10	30	10,354	N/A	N/A
2026-27	J2	20	TBD	38									TBD	TBD

Key

- Pos. = Position in league; P = Games played; W = Games won; D = Games drawn; L = Games lost; F = Goals scored; A = Goals conceded; GD = Goals difference; Pts = Points gained
- Attendance/G = Average home league attendance
- † 2020 & 2021 seasons attendances reduced by COVID-19 worldwide pandemic.
- Source: J. League Data Site
