= Ryo Adachi =

Japanese footballer and manager

Ryō Adachi 安達 亮
Personal information
- Full name: Ryō Adachi
- Date of birth: July 2, 1969 (age 57)
- Place of birth: Nishinomiya, Hyogo, Japan
- Height: 1.70 m (5 ft 7 in)
- Position: Forward

Team information
- Current team: Kataller Toyama (manager)

Youth career
- 1985–1987: Ichiritsu Funabashi High School

College career
Years	Team	Apps	(Gls)
1988–1991	Senshu University		

Senior career*
Years	Team	Apps	(Gls)
1992	Yokohama Flügels	0	(0)
Total		0	(0)

Managerial career
- 2012: Vissel Kobe (caretaker)
- 2012–2014: Vissel Kobe
- 2018–2020: Kataller Toyama
- 2021: ReinMeer Aomori
- 2022–2025: Yokohama F. Marinos (assistant)
- 2025–: Kataller Toyama
- * Club domestic league appearances and goals

Ryō Adachi (安達 亮, Adachi Ryō; born July 2, 1969) is a Japanese football manager and former player. He is the current manager of J2 League club Kataller Toyama .

== Playing career ==
Adachi was born in Nishinomiya on July 2, 1969. During the Funabashi High School, he served as captain and led the team play, introducing a special block signs. After graduating from Senshu University, he joined Yokohama Flügels in 1992. However he could not play at all in the match and retired end of 1992 season.

== Coaching career ==
After retirement, Adachi started coaching career at Yokohama Flügels from 1993. After that, he coached mainly youth team at Yokohama F. Marinos and Japan U-17 national team. In 2006, he joined his local club Vissel Kobe. Through mainly youth team manager, he became a coach for top team from 2010. In April 2012, manager Masahiro Wada was sacked and he became a manager as caretaker. He managed the club until Akira Nishino became a new manager in May. However Nishino was sacked in November and Adachi became a new manager. Although he managed the club again, the club was relegated to J2 League end of 2012 season. In 2013, the club won the 2nd place and returned to J1 League. He resigned end of 2014 season. In 2015, he moved to V-Varen Nagasaki and became a coach. In 2017, he returned to Vissel and worked as stuff until November. In May 2018, he signed with Kataller Toyama and became a manager as Tetsuro Uki successor.

== Managerial statistics ==
Update; December 31, 2018

Team	From	To	Record				
Team	From	To	G	W	D	L	Win %
Vissel Kobe	2012	2014	79	37	20	22	46.84
Kataller Toyama	2018	present	22	10	5	7	45.45
Total			101	47	25	29	46.53
