= Kataller Toyama =

Japanese football club

Kataller Toyama カターレ富山
- Full name: Kataller Toyama
- Founded: 1962; 64 years ago
- Stadium: Toyama Stadium; Toyama, Toyama
- Capacity: 25,251
- Chairman: Eiji Sakai
- Manager: Ryo Adachi
- League: J2 League
- 2025: J2 League, 17th of 20
- Website: kataller.co.jp
Home colours	Away colours

Kataller Toyama (カターレ富山, Katāre Toyama) is a football club based in Toyama, Capital of Toyama Prefecture. The club currently play in J2 League after promotion from J3 in 2024, Japanese second tier of professional football.

== History ==
The idea of a merged club had been discussed by the Toyama Prefectural Football Association as early as 2005, but discussions had come to nothing at the time.

On 10 September 2007, YKK (owner of YKK AP SC) and Hokuriku Electric Power Company (owner of ALO's Hokuriku), agreed with merging their clubs to aim promotion to the J.League in response of eager request by the TPFA. According to Tulip TV, local broadcasting company, over twenty companies informally promised to invest in the new club. In the media briefing, the governor of Toyama Prefecture also participated.

TPFA has founded an organisation named "Civic Football Club Team of Toyama Prefecture (富山県民サッカークラブチーム)" with two major economic organisation and representatives of Hokuriku Electric Power Company and YKK. The Japan Football League confirmed that the merged club would compete in the JFL from the 2008 season.

They applied for J.League Associate Membership in January 2008, then their application was accepted at the board meeting of J.League on 19 February 2008. On 23 November 2008, they secured qualification for promotion to the J2 League and on 1 December 2008, promotion was made official by J.League.

In 2014, after a six-year stint at the J2, Kataller Toyama was relegated to the J3 ahead of the 2015 season after a J2 bottom-place finish.

On 7 December 2024, Kataller Toyama secure promotion to J2 League after draw 2-2 against Matsumoto Yamaga and ended 10 years in third tier.

== Name and crest ==
The word "kataller" is a portmanteau of the phrase katare (勝たれ) which in Toyama dialect means "to win", and the French aller, "to go". The phrase is also intended to be a pun of Italian cantare, "to sing", and of native Japanese katare (語れ), "to talk" (written with a different kanji character).

The crest is shaped in the form of a tulip, the official Toyama Prefecture flower.

== League & cup record ==
Champions	Runners-up	Third place	Promoted	Relegated

League														J. League Cup	Emperor's Cup
Season	Div.	Tier	Teams	Pos.	P	W	D	L	F	A	GD	Pts	Attendance/G	J. League Cup	Emperor's Cup
2008	JFL	3	18	3rd	34	18	8	8	61	36	25	62	4,306	Not eligible	2nd round
2009	J2	2	18	13th	51	15	16	20	48	58	-10	61	3,740	Not eligible	3rd round
2010	J2	2	19	18th	36	8	4	24	39	71	-32	28	4,463	Not eligible	2nd round
2011	J2	2	20	16th	38	11	10	17	36	53	-17	43	3,275	Not eligible	3rd round
2012	J2	2	22	19th	42	9	11	22	38	59	-21	38	3,324	Not eligible	2nd round
2013	J2	2	22	18th	42	11	11	20	45	59	-14	44	4,474	Not eligible	2nd round
2014	J2	2	22	22nd	42	5	8	29	28	74	-46	23	4,266	Not eligible	3rd round
2015	J3	3	13	5th	36	14	10	12	37	36	1	52	2,820	Not eligible	Did not qualify
2016	J3	3	16	6th	30	13	10	7	37	27	10	49	3,608	Not eligible	2nd round
2017	J3	3	17	8th	32	13	8	11	37	33	4	47	3,159	Not eligible	2nd round
2018	J3	3	17	11th	32	12	5	15	41	50	-9	41	2,670	Not eligible	2nd round
2019	J3	3	18	4th	34	16	10	8	54	31	23	58	2,737	Not eligible	3rd round
2020 †	J3	3	18	9th	34	15	5	14	52	43	9	50	1,216	Not eligible	Did not qualify
2021	J3	3	15	4th	28	13	7	8	40	34	6	46	2,780	Not eligible	2nd round
2022	J3	3	18	6th	34	19	3	12	55	48	7	60	2,872	Not eligible	2nd round
2023	J3	3	20	3rd	38	19	5	14	59	48	11	62	3,444	Not eligible	3rd round
2024	J3	3	20	3rd	38	16	16	6	54	38	12	64	4,092	Playoff round	2nd round
2025	J2	2	20	17th	38	9	10	19	34	49	-15	37	5,635	3rd round	3rd round
2026	J2	2	40 (Note: Initially grouped into four groups of ten, Kataller Toyama finished in 1st place in their group.)	2nd	18 (Note: Excludes play-off round.)	10	5 (Note: Ties in the 100 Year Vision League regional round were decided by penalty shoot-outs. Two points were awarded for winning a shoot-out, and one point for losing. Kataller Toyama won three and lost two.)	3	37	24	13	38	5,601	N/A	N/A
2026–27	J2	2	20	TBD	38								-	TBD	TBD

Key

- Pos. = Position in league; P = Games played; W = Games won; D = Games drawn; L = Games lost; F = Goals scored; A = Goals conceded; GD = Goals difference; Pts = Points gained
- Attendance/G = Average home league attendance
- † 2020 season attendance reduced by COVID-19 worldwide pandemic
- Source: J.League Data Site

== Honours ==
Kataller Toyama honours
Honour	No.	Years
Toyama Prefectural Football Championship Emperor's Cup Toyama Prefectural Qualifiers	9	2008, 2016, 2017, 2018, 2019, 2021, 2022, 2023, 2024

== Current squad ==
As of 1 October 2026.

Note: Flags indicate national team as defined under FIFA eligibility rules; some limited exceptions apply. Players may hold more than one non-FIFA nationality.

No.	Pos.	Nation	Player
1	GK	JPN	Toshiki Hirao
2	DF	JPN	Haruto Matsumoto (on loan from Kashima Antlers)
3	DF	JPN	Yuki Kagawa
4	DF	JPN	Sota Fukazawa
5	DF	JPN	Junya Imase
6	MF	JPN	Shunta Sera
7	MF	JPN	Ayumu Kameda
8	MF	JPN	Daichi Matsuoka
9	FW	JPN	Tsubasa Yoshihira
10	FW	JPN	Riki Matsuda
11	FW	KOR	Kim Tae-won
13	FW	JPN	Keijiro Ogawa
14	MF	JPN	Shunsuke Tanimoto
15	FW	JPN	Kiyoshiro Tsuboi (on loan from Tokushima Vortis)
17	MF	JPN	Mahiro Yunomae
19	DF	JPN	Yuki Saneto
20	MF	KOR	Jung Woo-young

No.	Pos.	Nation	Player
21	GK	JPN	Riku Terakado
22	MF	JPN	Nobuyuki Shiina
23	DF	JPN	Shumpei Nishiya
27	DF	KOR	Kang Min-woo (on loan from Ulsan HD)
28	MF	JPN	Sho Fuseya
30	FW	JPN	Yuki Nakashima
31	GK	KOR	Koh Bong-jo
32	MF	JPN	Shun Mizoguchi
33	MF	JPN	Yoshiki Takahashi
34	MF	JPN	Genta Takenaka
39	FW	JPN	Manato Furukawa
43	MF	JPN	Shunta Ikeda ^{DSP}
48	MF	JPN	Keita Ueda
55	MF	JPN	Yuto Kunitake
56	DF	JPN	Shosei Okamoto
77	MF	JPN	Taro Kagawa ^{DSP}
99	GK	JPN	Gaku Harada

=== Out on loan ===
Note: Flags indicate national team as defined under FIFA eligibility rules; some limited exceptions apply. Players may hold more than one non-FIFA nationality.

No.	Pos.	Nation	Player
—	MF	JPN	Takumi Ito (at Renofa Yamaguchi FC)
—	DF	JPN	Atsushi Nabeta (at Reilac Shiga FC)

No.	Pos.	Nation	Player
—	MF	BRA	Gabriel Henrique (at EC Primavera)
—	DF	JPN	Yutaka Takeuchi (at Verspah Oita)

== Club officials ==
Position	Name
Manager	(Japan) Ryo Adachi
Assistant manager	(Japan) Yasuo Manaka
Goalkeeper coach	(Japan) Hiroaki Iidaka
Physical coach	(Japan) Takahiro Kiuchi
Technical staff	(Japan) Yuito Nakao
Interpreter	(Japan) Irala Gabriel Kitamura
Chief trainer	(Japan) Kazuyuki Yamamoto
Trainer	(Japan) Kei Shinohara
Competent	(Japan) Ryohei Taniguchi
Side affairs	(Japan) Takaharu Shirasaki

== Managerial history ==
Manager	Nationality	Tenure		Managerial Record				
Manager	Nationality	Start	Finish	P	W	D	L	Win%
Hiroshi Sowa	Japan	1 February 2008	29 September 2010	78	21	18	39	26.92
Takayoshi Amma	Japan	29 September 2010	31 December 2014	173	38	42	93	21.97
Yasuyuki Kishino	Japan	1 February 2015	27 August 2015					
Shigeo Sawairi	Japan	28 August 2015	30 November 2015					
Yasutoshi Miura	Japan	1 February 2016	31 January 2017					
Tetsurō Uki	Japan	1 February 2017	9 May 2018					
Ryō Adachi	Japan	9 May 2018	31 January 2021					
Nobuhiro Ishizaki	Japan	1 February 2021	19 September 2022					
Michiharu Otagiri	Japan	19 September 2022	27 May 2025					
Ryō Adachi	Japan	27 May 2025	Current					

== Kit and colours ==
=== Colours ===
Kataller Toyama's main colour is blue.

=== Kit evolution ===
Home kit - 1st
2008-2010	2011	2012	2013	2014
2015	2016	2017	2018	2019
2020	2021	2022	2023	2024
2025	2026 -			

Away kit - 2nd
2008-2010	2011	2012	2013	2014
2015	2016	2017	2018	2019
2021	2022	2023	2024	2025
2026 -
