= Kawane, Shizuoka =

Kawane 川根町
- Former municipality
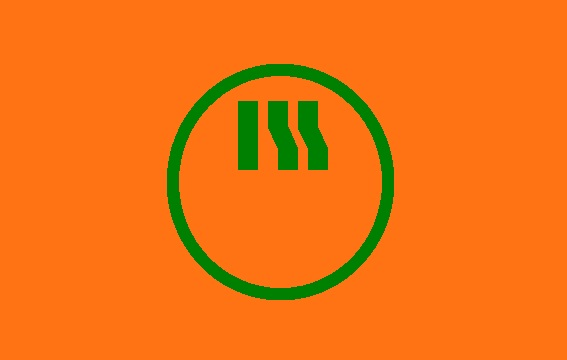
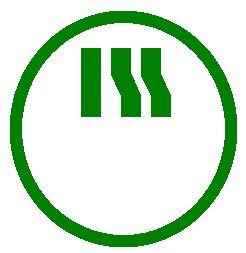
- Flag Emblem

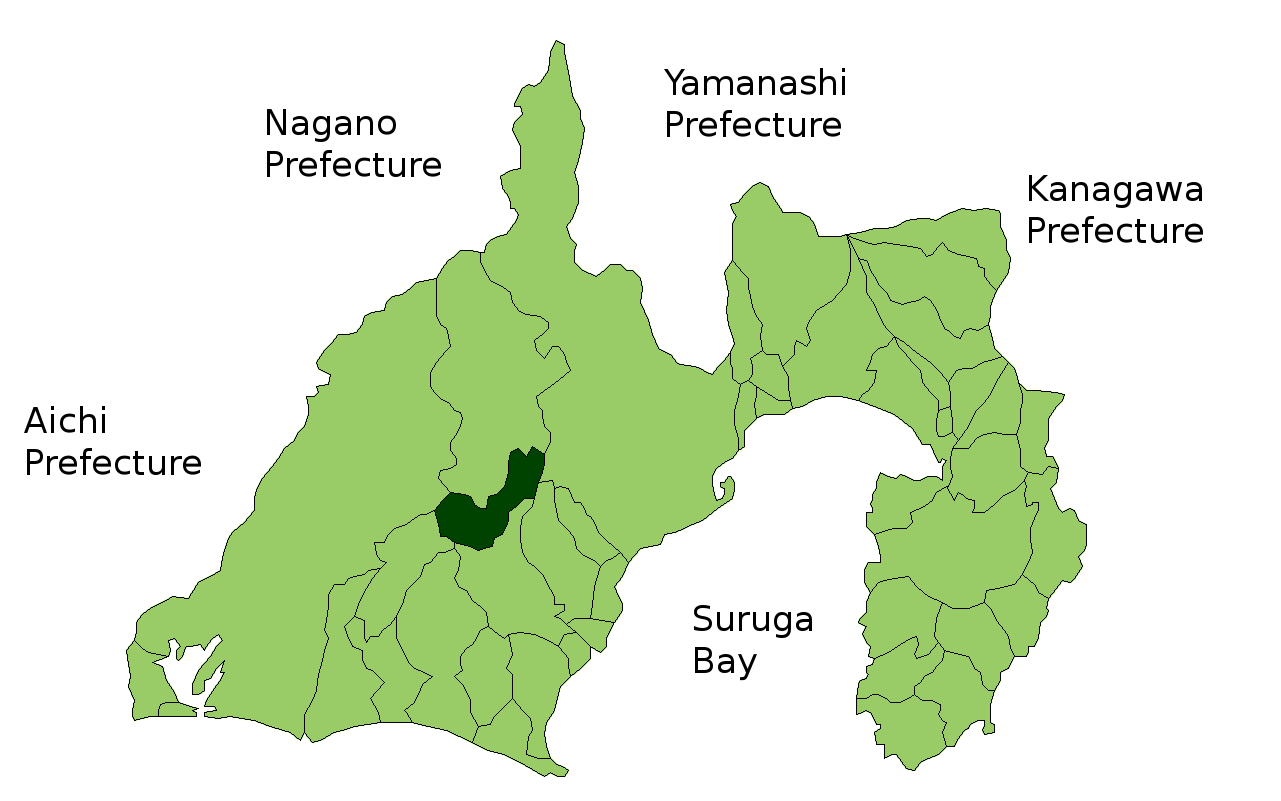
- Location of Kawane in Shizuoka Prefecture

- Location in Japan
- Coordinates: 34°57′N 138°5′E
- Country: Japan
- Region: Chūbu (Tōkai)
- Prefecture: Shizuoka Prefecture
- District: Haibara
- Merged: April 1, 2008 (now part of Shimada)

Area
  - Total: 120.48 km^{2} (46.52 sq mi)

Population (July 2005)
  - Total: 6,236
  - Density: 51.76/km^{2} (134.1/sq mi)
- Time zone: UTC+09:00 (JST)
- Website: City of Shimada
- Symbols
- Flower: sakura
- Tree: cryptomeria

Kawane (川根町, Kawane-chō) was a town located in Haibara District, Shizuoka Prefecture, Japan. It is notable for its production of Shizuoka green tea.

As of July 1, 2005, the town had an estimated population of 6,236 and a density of 51.76 persons per km^{2}. The total area was 120.48 km^{2}.

On April 1, 2008, Kawane was merged into the expanded city of Shimada and thus no longer exists as an independent municipality.

== Geography ==
There are a number of surrounding municipalities, including:

- Aoi-ku, Shizuoka city
- Tenryū-ku, Hamamatsu
- Shimada
- Fujieda
- Kawanehon, Haibara District
- Mori, Shuchi District

== History ==
- April 1, 1889 - "Shimokawane Village" founded from the merger of three pre-Meiji villages.
- January 1, 1955 - Merged part of Ikumi Village in Shida District.
- February 26, 1955 - Merged Sasama Village in Shida District.
- April 1, 1955 - Shimokawane Village was reclassified as Kawane Town.
- April 1, 2008 - Kawane Town was merged into Shimada City.
