= List of natural gas-fired power stations =

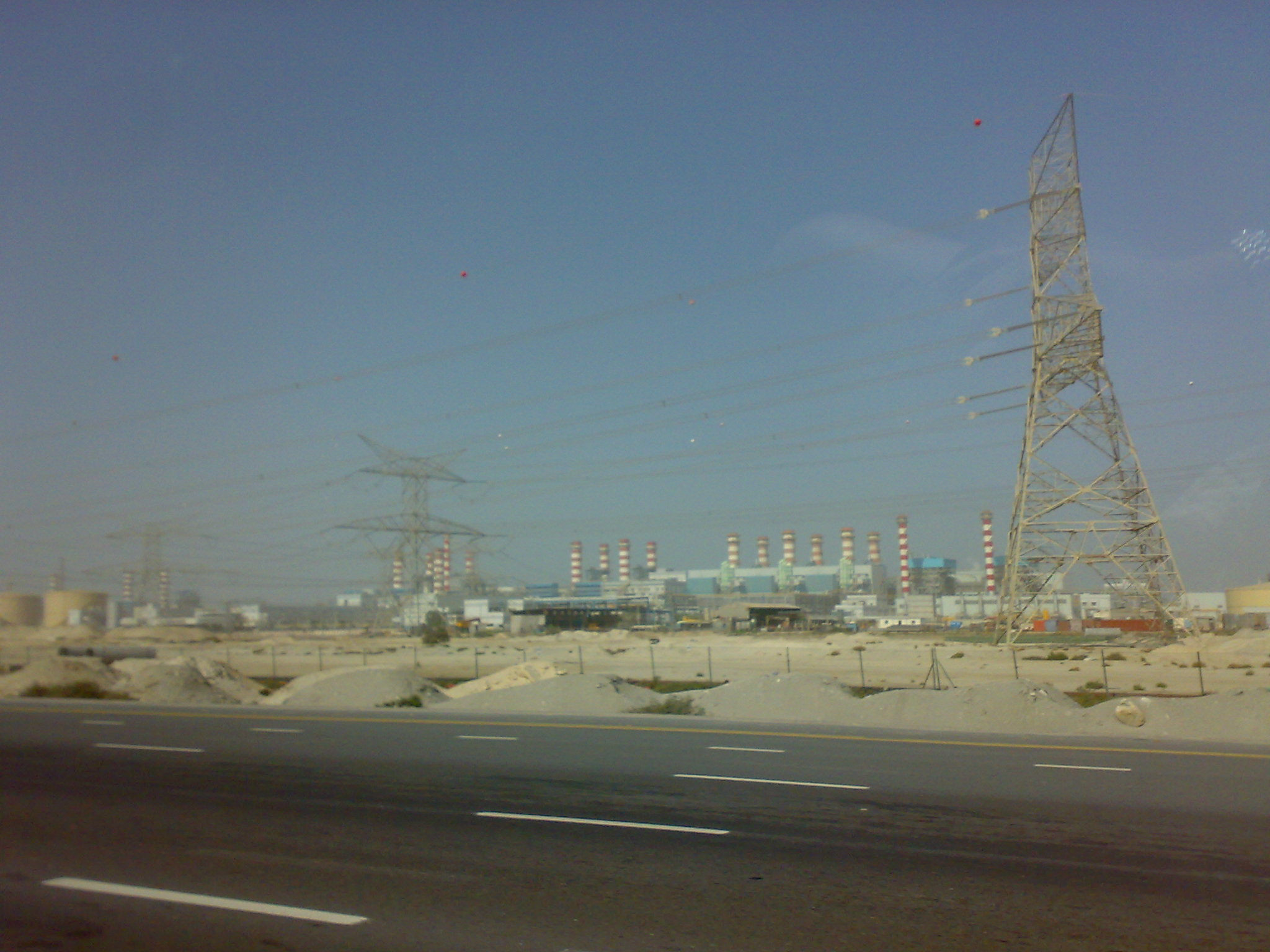
Jebel Ali Power and Desalination Plant

The following page lists power stations that run on natural gas, a non-renewable resource. Stations that are only at a proposed stage or decommissioned, and power stations that are smaller than 3000 MW in nameplate capacity, are not included in this list. Other power stations may be found in national lists linked from the end of this article.

== In service ==
Station	Country	Location	Capacity (MW)	Ref
Anegasaki Power Station	Japan	35°29′06″N 140°01′00″E	3,600	
Burullus Power Plant	Egypt	31°31′46″N 30°48′32″E	4,800	
Chiba Power Station	Japan	35°33′57″N 140°06′20″E	4,380	
Futtsu Power Station	Japan	35°20′35″N 139°50′02″E	5,040	
Higashi-Niigata	Japan	37°59′58″N 139°14′29″E	4,780	
Himeji-2 Power Station	Japan	34°46′24″N 134°41′38″E	4,086	
Jebel Ali Power and Desalination Plant	United Arab Emirates	25°03′35″N 55°07′02″E	8,695	
Kawagoe Power Station	Japan	35°00′25″N 136°41′20″E	4,802	
Kostromskaya Power Station	Russia	57°27′34″N 41°10′30″E	3,720	
Permskaya GRES^{(Russian)}	Russia	58°30′00″N 56°20′20″E	3,393	
Phú Mỹ Power Plants	Vietnam	10°36′20″N 107°02′12″E	3,900	
Shin-Nagoya Power Station	Japan		3,058	
Surgut-1 Power Station	Russia	61°16′46″N 73°29′20″E	3,333	
Surgut-2 Power Station	Russia	61°16′46″N 73°30′45″E	5,687	
Syrdarya Power Plant	Uzbekistan	40°13′41″N 69°6′2″E	3,215	
Tatan Power Plant	Taiwan	25°01′34″N 121°02′50″E	4,986	
West County Energy Center	USA	26°42′0″N 80°22′30″W	3,750	
Yokohama Power Station	Japan		3,325	

== See also ==
- List of largest power stations in the world
- List of coal power stations
- List of fuel oil power stations
- List of nuclear power stations
