= Chiba Thermal Power Station =

Japanese thermal power station

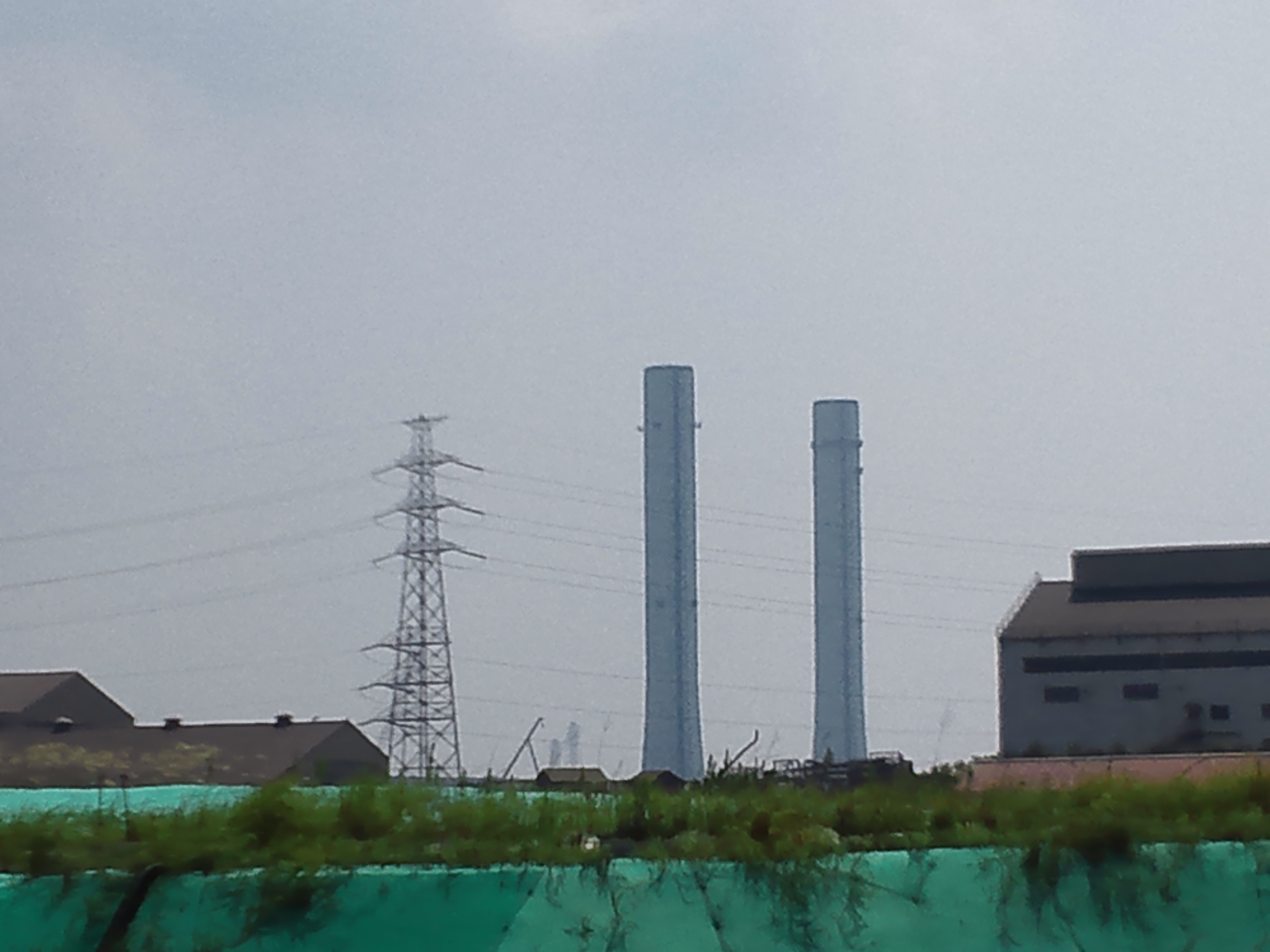
- Country: Japan
- Location: Chiba Bay, Chuo-ku, Chiba, Japan
- Coordinates: 35.56477°N 140.1053°E
- Status: Operational
- Commission date: Group 1 & 2 - 2000; Group 3 - 2014
- Construction cost: 340+ billion Yen
- Owner: JERA
- Operator: JERA

Thermal power station
- Primary fuel: Liquefied natural gas
- Site area: ~0.76 million m²
- Combined cycle?: CCGT
- IWPP water output: Into Sea

Power generation
- Units operational: 8 x 360MW + 3 x 500MW
- Nameplate capacity: 4380 MW

External links
- Website: Chiba Thermal Power Station

Chiba Thermal Power Station, is an operational thermal power station located in the city of Chiba, Japan. It is owned and operated by JERA, with a maximum output of 4380 MW. Originally built in the late 1950s as a coal-burning plant, it was later converted to a plant burning liquefied natural gas in 2000.

== History ==
Chiba Thermal Power Station began operations in the late 1950s as a 600MW capacity coal fired power plant. It had four units however due to aging facilities and increasing demand for electricity, in 2000 the plant was renovated to a combined cycle power plant and fuelled with Liquefied Natural Gas (LNG). Groups 1 and 2 were constructed in 2000 with a maximum output of 2880 MW. In 2011, as part of an emergency plan to supply power after the Great East Japan Earthquake, three gas turbine systems were constructed within 4 months. From 2012 to 2014, a more advanced combined cycle system was added as group 3. This added an additional 1500MW capacity.

== Power generation ==
When Chiba Thermal Power Station was renovated to a combined cycle power plant, Groups 1 & 2 were constructed. Each has a total power output of 1440 MW. Group 3 was constructed outdoors, as opposed to indoors like Groups 1 and 2, due to the need for it to be built quickly after the Great East Japan Earthquake. Group 3 added a power output of 1500MW. The total power output of the station is 4380MW and the site covers approximately 760,000 square metres of land. LNG is supplied by pipeline from terminals located at Sodegaura Power Station and Futtsu Power Station and the plant outputs its cooling water into the nearby sea.

	Operation Started	Power Generation Type	Design Thermal Efficiency	Output	Total Output
Group 1	April 2000	ACC	54.2%	360MW x 4	1440MW
Group 2	June 2000	ACC	54.2%	360MW x 4	1440MW
Group 3	July 2014	MACC	Units 3-1 and 3-2: 57.3% Unit 3-3: 57.7%	500MW x 3	1500MW

== Historic power generation ==
Group 1 of the original coal-fired power station began operations in April 1957, and in following years more groups were added, ending with Group 4 in November 1959. Originally burning coal, the plant later switched to crude oil. Due to aging facilities and the increasing demand for electricity, in 2000 the plant was renovated and a new combined cycle power generation system was installed (see above).

	Operation Started	Operation Ended	Fuel	Design Thermal Efficiency	Total Output
Group 1 (old)	April 1957	March 1999	Coal, later Crude Oil	37.2%	125MW
Group 2 (old)	November 1957	March 1999	Coal, later Crude Oil	37.2%	125MW
Group 3 (old)	January 1959	March 1999	Coal, later Crude Oil	38.8%	175MW
Group 4 (old)	November 1959	March 1999	Coal, later Crude Oil	38.8%	175MW

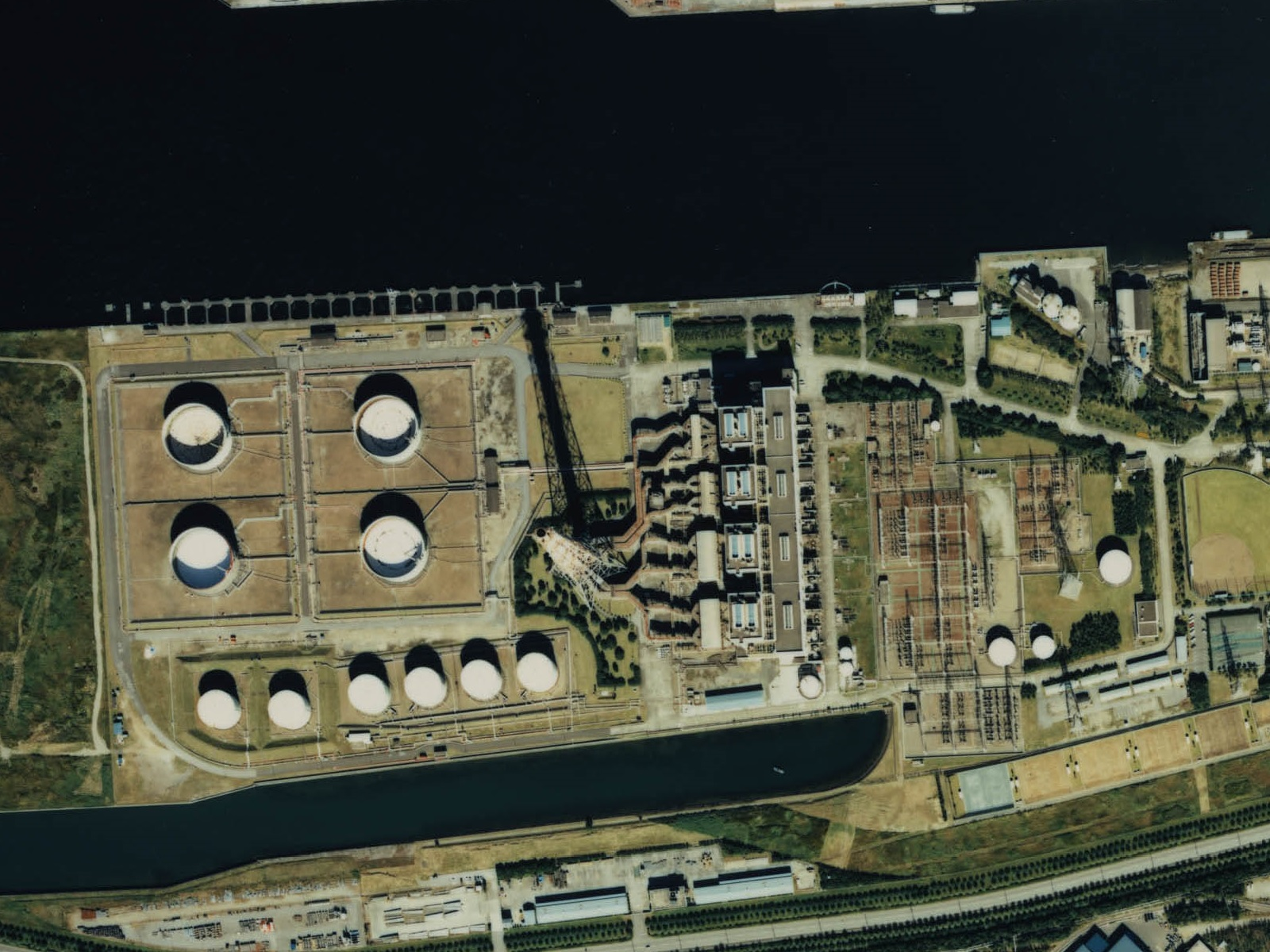
Aerial view of the old facility, photographed in 1988

== See also ==
- JERA
- List of power stations in Japan
