= List of power stations in Japan =

This page is a list of power stations in Japan that are publicly or privately owned.

== List ==
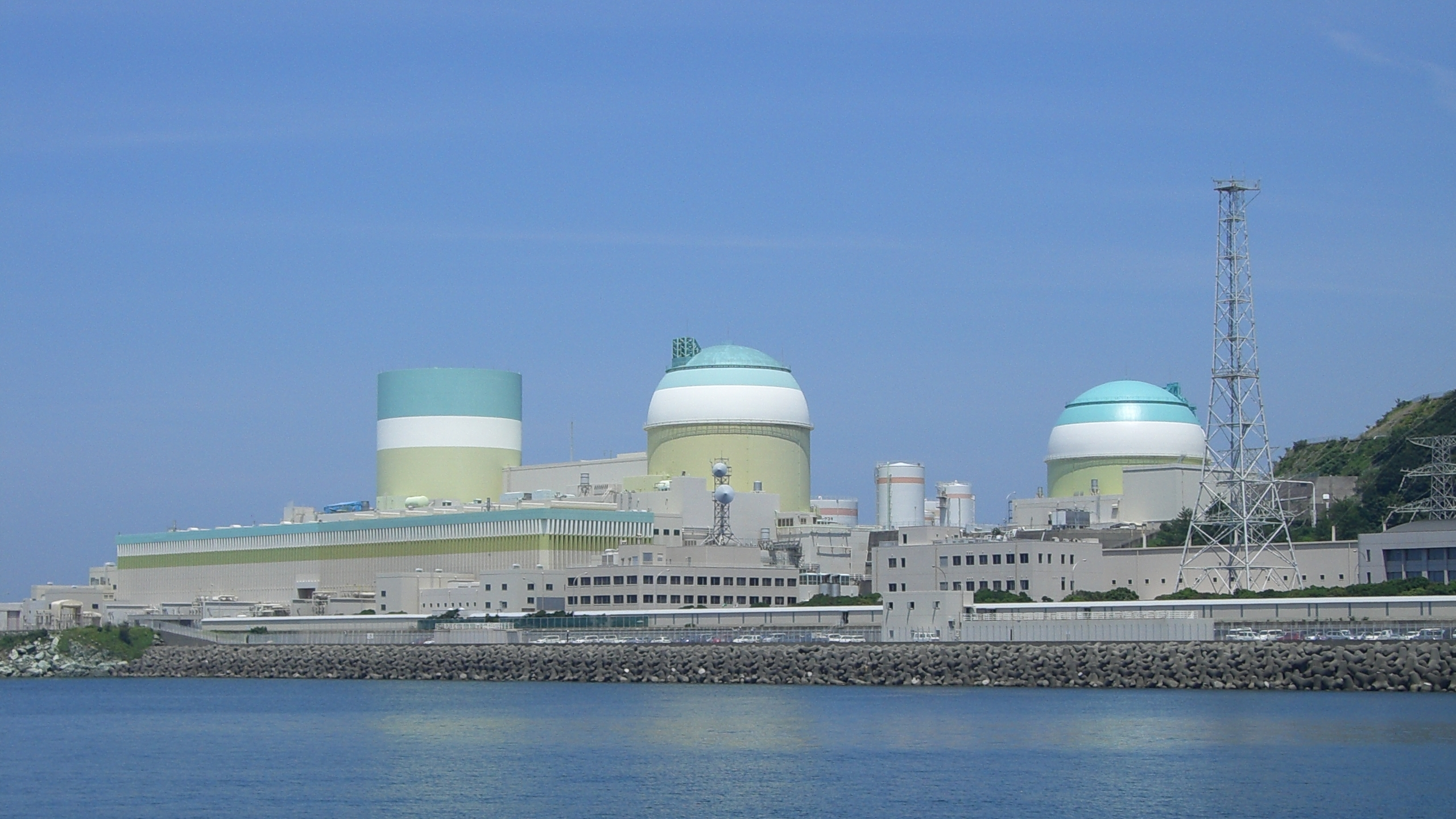
The Ikata Nuclear Power Plant

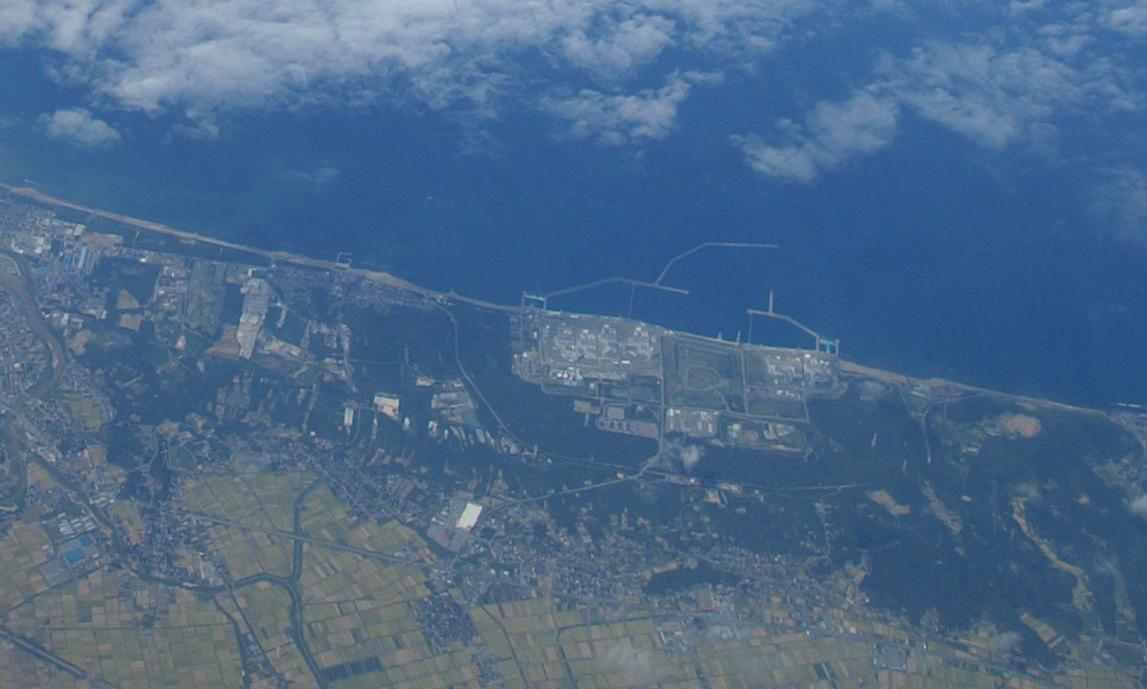
The Kashiwazaki-Kariwa Nuclear Power Plant as seen from space

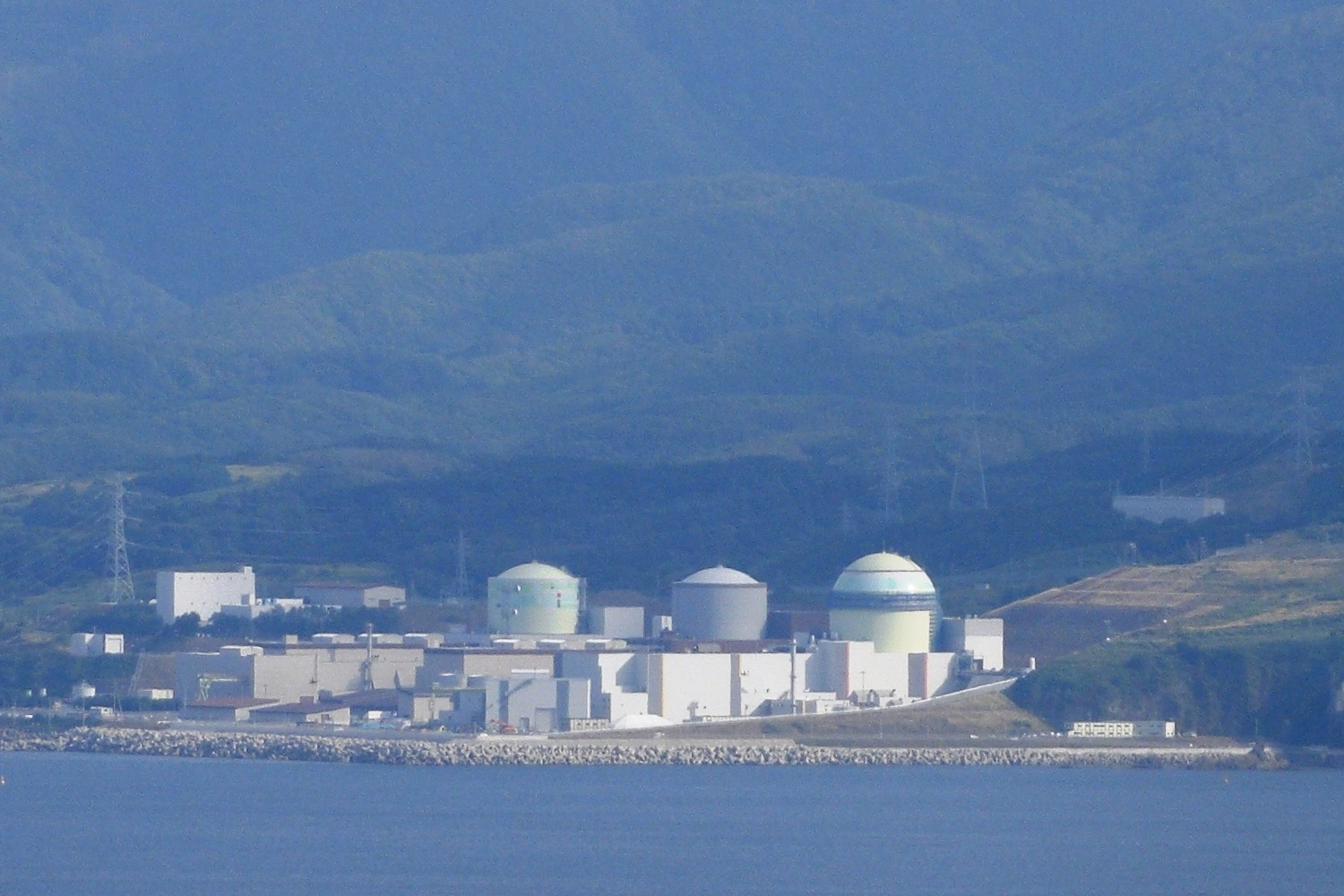
The Tomari Nuclear Power Plant

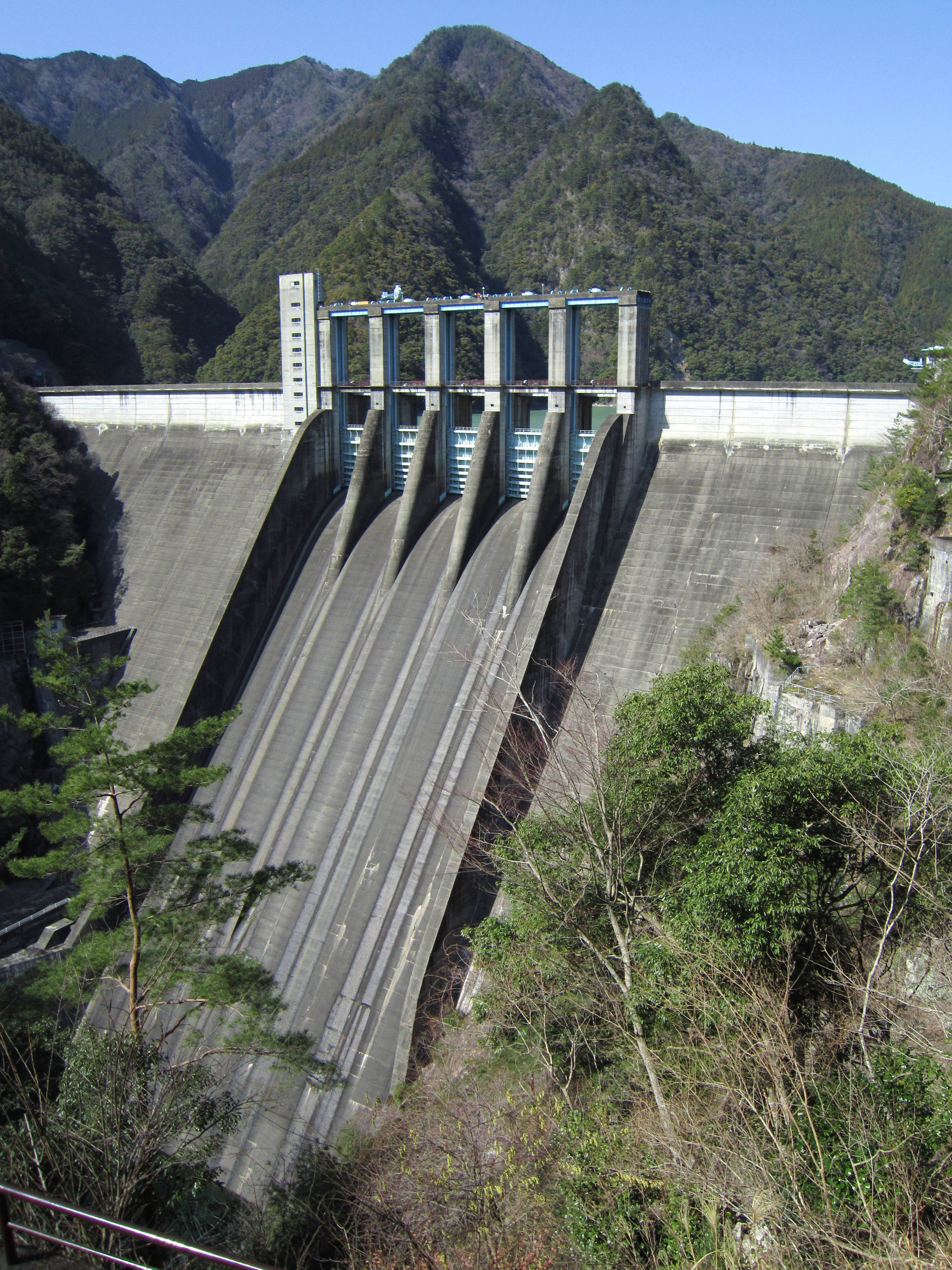
The Sakuma Dam

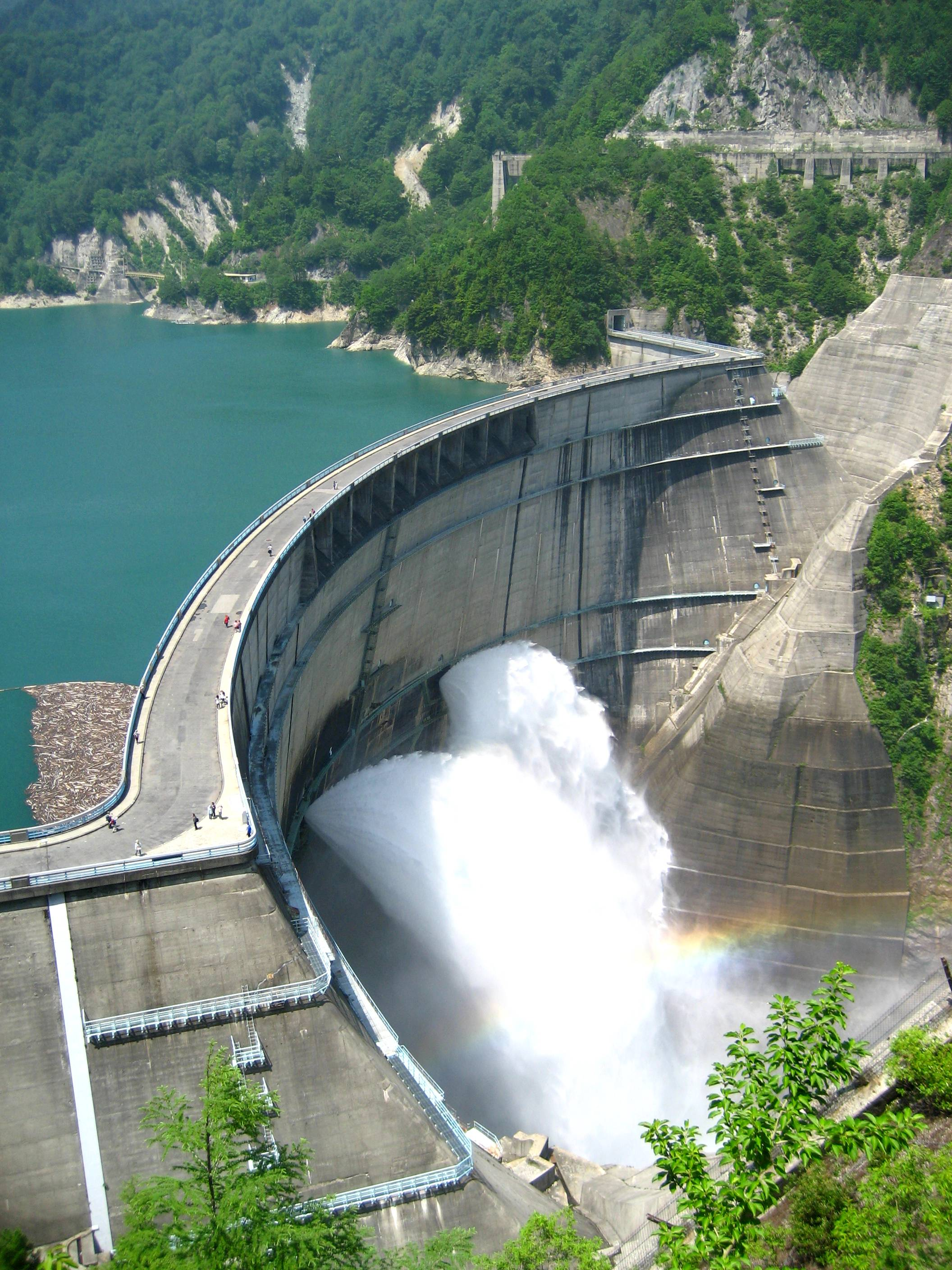
The Kurobe Dam

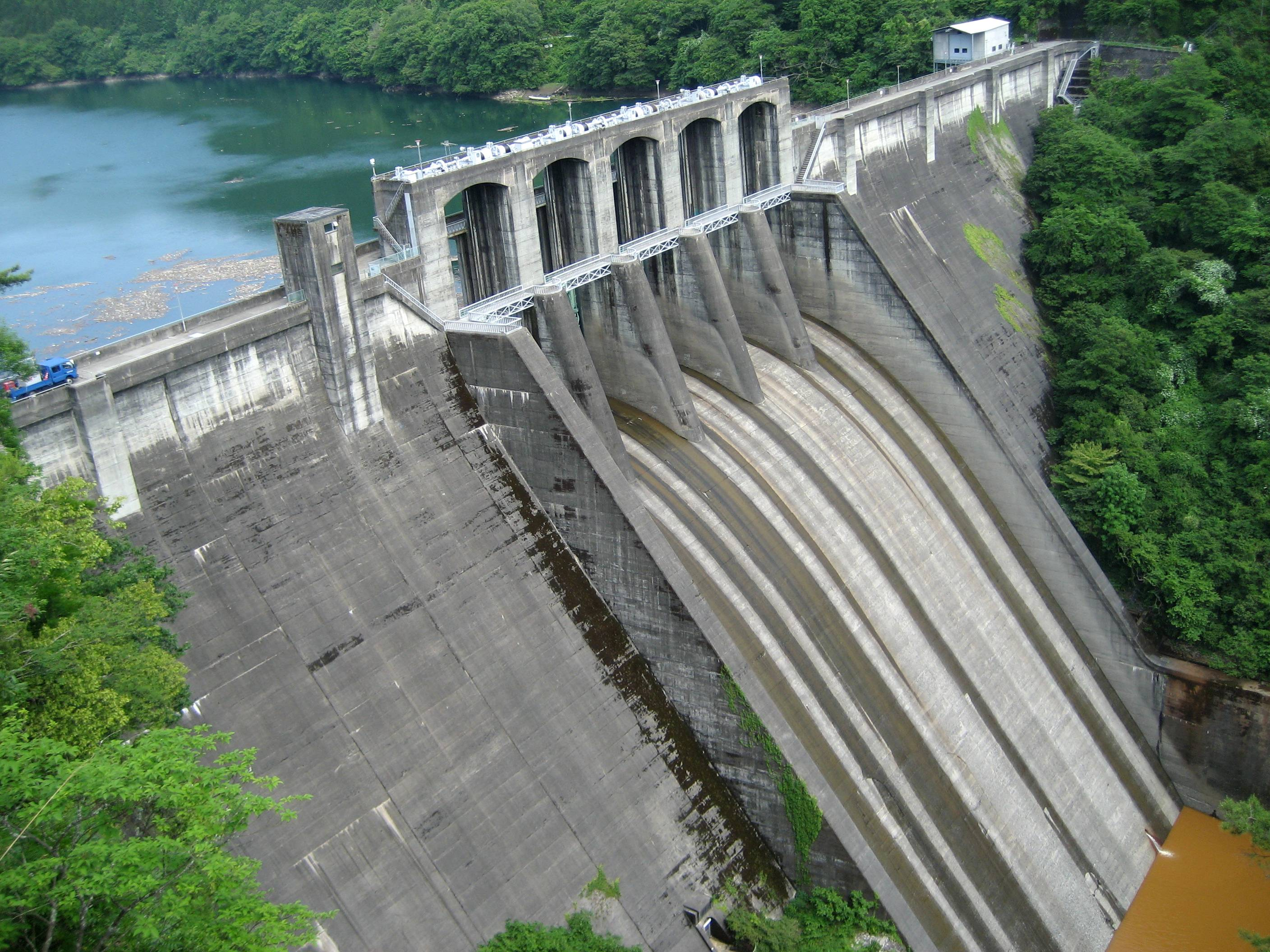
The Maruyama Dam

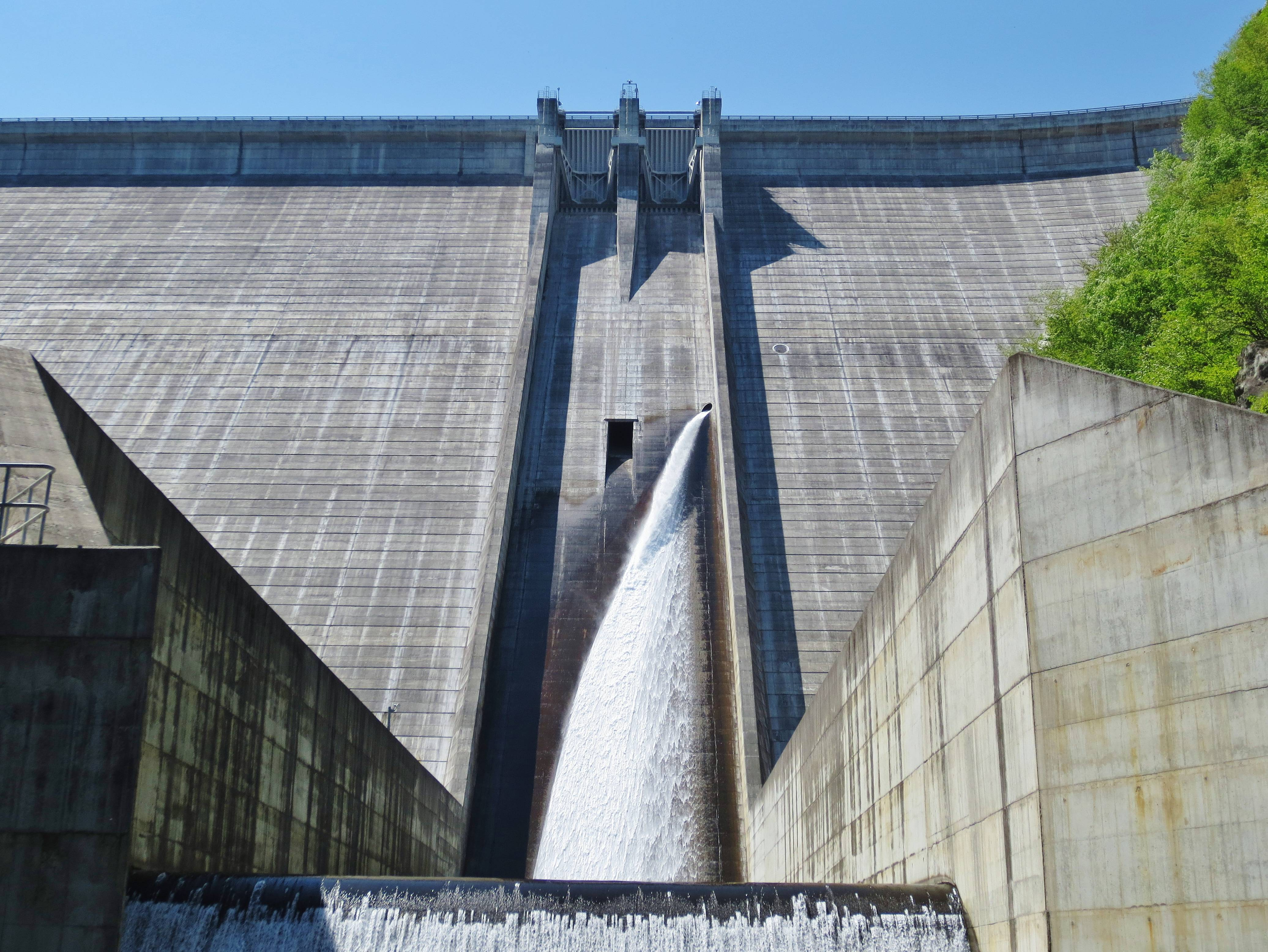
The Ueno Dam, lower reservoir of the pumped-storage Kannagawa Hydropower Plant

Station	Prefecture	Coordinates	Capacity (MW)	Fuel type	Year	Status	Refs
Hekinan (碧南火力発電所)	Aichi	34°50′01″N 136°57′44″E	4,100	Coal			
Hitachinaka (常陸那珂火力発電所)	Ibaraki		2,000	Coal (bituminous)			
Ishikawa	Okinawa		312	Coal (bituminous)			
Kashima	Ibaraki		507	Coal (bituminous)			
Kin	Okinawa		440	Coal (bituminous)			
Maizuru (舞鶴発電所)	Kyoto		1,800	Coal			
Matsuura (松浦発電所)	Saga		2,700	Coal (bituminous)			
Misumi	Shimane		1,000	Coal (bituminous)			
Naie (奈井江発電所)	Hokkaido		350	Coal			
Nakoso	Fukushima		1,625	Coal (bituminous)			
Nanao-Ohta	Ishikawa		1,200	Coal (bituminous)			
Niihamanishi (新居浜西火力発電所)	Ehime	33°57′07″N 133°14′22″E	150	Coal			
Reihoku (苓北発電所)	Kumamoto		1,400	Coal			
Sakata	Yamagata		700	Coal			
Sendai	Miyagi		525	Coal			
Sunagawa (砂川発電所)	Hokkaido		250	Coal			
Tomato-Atsuma (苫東厚真発電所)	Tomakomai, Hokkaido		1,650	Coal			
Atsumi (渥美火力発電所)	Aichi		2,400	Oil			
Date (伊達発電所)	Hokkaido		700	Oil			
Hirono (広野火力発電所)	Fukushima	37°14′18″N 141°01′04″E	4,400	Oil			
Kashima (鹿島火力発電所)	Ibaraki	35°52′47″N 140°41′22″E	5,204	Oil			
Oi (大井火力発電所)	Tokyo	35°36′54″N 139°45′24″E	1,050	Oil			
Shiriuchi (知内発電所)	Hokkaido		700	Oil			
Taketoyo (武豊火力発電所)	Aichi		1,345	Oil			
Tomakomai (苫小牧発電所)	Hokkaido		250	Oil			
Onbetsu (音別発電所)	Kushiro, Hokkaido		280	Diesel			
Anegasaki (姉崎火力発電所)	Chiba	35°29′06″N 140°01′00″E	3,600	Gas			
Chiba (千葉火力発電所)	Chiba		3,882	Gas			
Chita (知多火力発電所)	Aichi	34°59′12″N 136°50′37″E	3,966	Gas			
Chita II (知多第二火力発電所)	Aichi		1,708	Gas			
Futtsu (富津火力発電所)	Chiba	35°20′35″N 139°50′02″E	5,040	Gas			
Goi (五井火力発電所)	Chiba		1,886	Gas			
Higashi-Ogishima (東扇島火力発電所)	Kanagawa		2,000	Gas			
Himeji (姫路発電所)	Hyogo		3,992	Gas			
Kawagoe (川越火力発電所)	Mie	35°00′25″N 136°41′20″E	4,802	Gas			
Minami-Yokohama (南横浜火力発電所)	Kanagawa		1,150	Gas			
Nanko (南港発電所)	Osaka		1,800	Gas			
Sakaiko (堺港発電所)	Osaka		2,000	Gas			
Shinagawa (品川火力発電所)	Tokyo		1,140	Gas			
Shin-Nagoya (新名古屋火力発電所)	Aichi		2,992	Gas			
Sodegaura (袖ケ浦火力発電所)	Chiba	35°27′45″N 139°58′37″E	3,600	Gas			
Yokkaichi (四日市火力発電所)	Mie		1,245	Gas			
Yokohama (横浜火力発電所)	Kanagawa		3,325	Gas			
Yokosuka (横須賀火力発電所)	Kanagawa	35°18′40″N 139°38′39″E	230	Gas			
Fugen (ふげん)	Tsuruga, Fukui	35°45′16″N 136°00′59″E	557	Nuclear		Decommissioned	
Fukushima I Nuclear Power Plant (福島第一原子力発電所)	Fukushima	37°25′17″N 141°01′57″E	4,696	Nuclear		Cold shutdown, reactors 1-4 damaged, to be decommissioned	
Fukushima II Nuclear Power Plant (福島第二原子力発電所)	Fukushima	37°19′10″N 141°01′16″E	4,400	Nuclear		Cold shutdown	
Genkai Nuclear Power Plant (玄海原子力発電所)	Saga	33°30′56″N 129°50′14″E	3,478	Nuclear		Operational	
Hamaoka Nuclear Power Plant (浜岡原子力発電所)	Shizuoka	34°37′25″N 138°08′33″E	4,997	Nuclear		Suspended	
Higashidōri Nuclear Power Plant (東通原子力発電所)	Aomori	41°11′17″N 141°23′25″E	1,100	Nuclear		Suspended	
Ikata Nuclear Power Plant (伊方発電所)	Ehime	33°29′27″N 132°18′41″E	2,022	Nuclear		Operational	
Kashiwazaki-Kariwa Nuclear Power Plant (柏崎刈羽原子力発電所)	Niigata	37°25′42″N 138°36′06″E	8,212	Nuclear		Suspended	
Maki Nuclear Power Plant (巻原子力発電所)	Niigata Prefecture	37°25′17″N 141°01′57″E	825	Nuclear		Withdrawn	
Mihama Nuclear Power Plant (美浜発電所)	Fukui	35°42′09″N 135°57′48″E	1,666	Nuclear		Suspended	
Monju Nuclear Power Plant (もんじゅ)	Fukui	35°44′25″N 135°59′17″E	280	Nuclear		Suspended	
Namie-Odaka Nuclear Power Plant (浪江・小高原子力発電所)	Fukushima		825	Nuclear		Cancelled	
Ōi Nuclear Power Plant (大飯発電所)	Fukui	35°32′26″N 135°39′07″E	4,710	Nuclear		Suspended	
Ōma Nuclear Power Plant (大間原子力発電所)	Aomori	41°30′35″N 140°54′37″E	1,383	Nuclear		Under construction	
Onagawa Nuclear Power Plant (女川原子力発電所)	Miyagi	38°24′04″N 141°29′59″E	2,174	Nuclear		Cold shutdown	
Sendai Nuclear Power Plant (川内原子力発電所)	Kagoshima	31°50′01″N 130°11′23″E	1,780	Nuclear		Operational	
Shika Nuclear Power Plant (志賀原子力発電所)	Ishikawa	37°03′40″N 136°43′35″E	1,898	Nuclear		Suspended	
Shimane Nuclear Power Plant (島根原子力発電所)	Shimane	35°32′18″N 132°59′57″E	1,280	Nuclear		Suspended	
Takahama Nuclear Power Plant (高浜原子力発電所)	Fukui	35°31′20″N 135°30′17″E	3,304	Nuclear		Operational	
Tōkai Nuclear Power Plant (東海原子力発電所)	Ibaraki	36°27′59″N 140°36′24″E	1,100	Nuclear		Suspended	
Tomari Nuclear Power Plant (泊発電所)	Hokkaidō	43°02′10″N 140°30′45″E	2,070	Nuclear		Shut down for maintenance	
Tsuruga Nuclear Power Plant (敦賀発電所)	Fukui	35°40′22″N 136°04′38″E	1,517	Nuclear		Suspended	
Akiba Dam (秋葉ダム)	Shizuoka	34°58′20″N 137°49′42″E	127.1	Hydroelectric			
Arimine Dam (有峰ダム)	Toyama	36°29′22″N 137°26′55″E	53.4	Hydroelectric			
Dashidaira Dam (出し平ダム)	Toyama		124	Hydroelectric			
Funagira Dam (船明ダム)	Shizuoka	34°53′26″N 137°48′54″E	32	Hydroelectric			
Hatanagi-I Hydroelectric Dam (畑薙第一ダム)	Shizuoka	35°19′17″N 138°10′59″E	137	Hydroelectric			
Hatanagi-II Hydroelectric Dam (畑薙第二ダム)	Shizuoka	35°18′29″N 138°12′11″E	85	Hydroelectric			
Hiraoka Dam (平岡ダム)	Nagano		101	Hydroelectric			
Honkawa Pumped Storage Plant (本川発電所)	Kochi		600	Hydroelectric, pumped storage			
Ikawa Dam (井川ダム)	Shizuoka	35°12′38″N 138°13′22″E	62	Hydroelectric			
Ikehara Pumped Storage Plant (池原発電所)	Nara		350	Hydroelectric, pumped storage			
Imaichi Pumped Storage Plant	Tochigi	36°49′31″N 139°39′58″E	1,050	Hydroelectric, pumped storage			
Kadonogawa Power Station (葛野川発電所)	Yamanashi		800	Hydroelectric			
Kannagawa Hydropower Plant (神流川発電所)^{U/C}	Nagano	36°00′18″N 138°39′09″E	2,820 (940 operational)	Hydroelectric, pumped storage		2 of 6 units operational	
Kazunogawa Pumped Storage Plant (葛野川ダム)	Yamanashi	35°43′07″N 138°55′47″E	1,600	Hydroelectric, pumped storage			
Kinugawa Pumped Storage Plant (鬼怒川発電所)	Tochigi		127	Hydroelectric, pumped storage			
Kisenyama Pumped Storage Plant (喜撰山発電所)	Kyoto Prefecture	34°53′30″N 135°51′34″E	466	Hydroelectric, pumped storage			
Konoyama Dam (高野山ダム)	Niigata		126	Hydroelectric			
Kurobe Dam (黒部ダム)	Toyama	36°33′30″N 137°40′00″E	335	Hydroelectric			
Kuroda Dam (黒田ダム)	Aichi	35°11′14″N 137°28′34″E	315	Hydroelectric			
Maruyama Dam (丸山ダム)	Gifu	35°28′08″N 137°10′20″E	185	Hydroelectric			
Masegawa Dam (馬瀬川ダム)	Gifu		288	Hydroelectric			
Matanoagawa Pumped Storage Plant (俣野川発電所)	Tottori	35°14′44″N 133°29′30″E	1,500	Hydroelectric, pumped storage			
Miboro Dam (御母衣ダム)	Gifu	36°08′17.7″N 136°54′38.9″E	215	Hydroelectric			
Midono Pumped Storage Plant (水殿発電所)	Nagano		245	Hydroelectric, pumped storage			
Miho Dam (三保ダム)	Kanagawa	35°24′37″N 139°02′30″E	7.4	Hydroelectric			
Misakubo Dam (塩郷ダム)	Shizuoka	35°11′05″N 137°55′54″E	50	Hydroelectric			
Miyagase Dam (宮ヶ瀬ダム)	Kanagawa	35°32′26″N 139°15′09″E	24	Hydroelectric			
Miyanaka Dam (宮中ダム)	Niigata		449	Hydroelectric			
Nagano Pumped Storage Plant (長野発電所)	Fukui		220	Hydroelectric, pumped storage			
Niikappu Pumped Storage Plant (新冠発電所)	Hokkaido		200	Hydroelectric, pumped storage			
Nishiotaki Dam (西大滝ダム)	Nagano		234	Hydroelectric			
Numappara Pumped Storage Plant (沼原発電所)	Tochigi		675	Hydroelectric, pumped storage			
Ohashi Dam (大橋ダム)	Kōchi	33°46′13″N 133°20′12″E	615	Hydroelectric			
Ōigawa Dam (大井川ダム)	Shizuoka	35°09′53″N 138°08′34″E	68.2	Hydroelectric			
Okawachi Pumped Storage Power Station (大河内発電所)	Hyogo		1,280	Hydroelectric, pumped storage			
Okinawa Yanbaru Seawater Pumped Storage Power Station(沖縄やんばる海水揚水発電所)	Okinawa	26°40′25″N 128°15′56″E	30	Hydroelectric, pumped storage			
Okukiyotsu Pumped Storage Power Station (奥清津発電所)	Niigata		1,600	Hydroelectric, pumped storage			
Okutadami Dam (奥只見ダム)	Niigata	37°09′12″N 139°15′00″E	560	Hydroelectric			
Okutataragi Pumped Storage Plant (奥多々良木発電所)	Hyōgo	35°14′12″N 134°51′23″E	1,932	Hydroelectric, pumped storage			
Okuyoshino Pumped Storage Plant (奥吉野発電所)	Nara	34°7′4″N 135°49′16″E	1,206	Hydroelectric, pumped storage			
Omarugawa Pumped Storage Power Station	Miyazaki	32°14′52″N 131°22′25″E	1,200	Hydroelectric, pumped storage			
Otori Dam (大鳥ダム)	Fukushima	37°12′53″N 139°12′50″E	182	Hydroelectric			
Shimogo Pumped Storage Power Station	Fukushima		1,000	Hydroelectric, pumped storage			
Sagami Dam (相模ダム)	Kanagawa	35°36′56″N 139°11′43″E	31	Hydroelectric			
Sakuma Dam (佐久間ダム)	Aichi	35°05′58″N 137°47′39″E	350	Hydroelectric			
Sasamagawa Dam (笹間川ダム)	Shizuoka	34°58′17″N 138°05′38″E	58	Hydroelectric			
Senzu Dam (千頭ダム)	Shizuoka	35°13′00″N 138°05′25″E	22.2	Hydroelectric			
Shin-Takasegawa Pumped Storage Plant (新高瀬川発電所)	Nagano	36°28′26″N 137°41′23″E	1,280	Hydroelectric, pumped storage			
Shinanogawa Pumped Storage Plant (信濃川発電所)	Niigata		449	Hydroelectric, pumped storage			
Shintoyone Pumped Storage Plant (新豊根発電所)	Aichi	35°07′33″N 137°45′38″E	1,120	Hydroelectric, pumped storage			
Shiobara Pumped Storage Plant (塩原発電所)	Ibaraki		900	Hydroelectric, pumped storage			
Shiogō Dam (塩郷ダム)	Shizuoka	35°00′05″N 138°05′15″E	58	Hydroelectric			
Shiroyama Dam (城山ダム)	Kanagawa	35°35′09″N 139°17′22″E	275	Hydroelectric			
Tagokura Dam (田子倉ダム)	Fukushima	37°18′38″N 139°17′13″E	390	Hydroelectric			
Takami Pumped Storage Plant (高見発電所)	Hokkaido		200	Hydroelectric			
Taki Dam (滝ダム)	Fukushima	37°23′13″N 139°32′02″E	92	Hydroelectric			
Tamahara Pumped Storage Power Station (玉原発電所)	Gunma	36°46′56″N 139°03′23″E	1,200	Hydroelectric, pumped storage			
Tashiro Dam (田代ダム)	Shizuoka	35°29′55″N 138°14′47″E	40.1	Hydroelectric			
Tedorigawa Dam (手取川ダム)	Ishikawa		250	Hydroelectric			
Tokuyama Dam (徳山ダム)	Gifu	35°39′55″N 136°30′08″E	153	Hydroelectric			
Okuyahagi Pumped Storage Power Station (奥矢作発電所)	Aichi	35°11′59″N 137°27′31″E	1,095	Hydroelectric, pumped storage			
Yagisawa Pumped Storage Plant (矢木沢発電所)	Gunma		240	Hydroelectric, pumped storage			
Yomikaki Power Station (読書発電所)	Nagano		117	Hydroelectric			
Setouchi Kirei Mega Solar Power Plant	Setouchi, Okayama		235	Solar photovoltaic	2018		
Eurus Rokkasho Solar Park	Rokkasho, Aomori		148	Solar photovoltaic	2015		
SoftBank Tomatoh Abira Solar Park	Abira, Hokkaido	42.719710, 141.794779	111	Solar photovoltaic	2015		
Oita Solar Power	Oita		82	Solar photovoltaic	2014		
Kagoshima Nanatsujima Mega Solar Power Plant	Kagoshima		70	Solar photovoltaic	2013		
Yamaguchi Shin Mine Solar	Yamaguchi	34.249849, 131.181618	56.3	Solar photovoltaic	2018	In operation	
Tahara Solar-Wind Joint Project	Aichi		50	Solar photovoltaic	2014		
Kisozaki reclaimed land mega-solar	Mie		49	Solar photovoltaic	2014		
Tahara Solar Daini Power Plant	Aichi		40.7	Solar photovoltaic	2015		
Futtsu Solar	Chiba		40.36	Solar photovoltaic	2014		
Tahara Solar Daiichi Power Plant	Aichi		40.2	Solar photovoltaic	2015		
Mito Newtown Mega Solar Park	Ibaraki		39.21	Solar photovoltaic	2015		
Awaji Kifune Solar Power Plant (淡路貴船太陽光発電所)	Hyogo		34.7	Solar photovoltaic	2014		
Eurus Shiranuka Solar Park	Hokkaido		32.52	Solar photovoltaic	2014		
Kamogawa Mirai Solar Power Plant	Chiba		31.211	Solar photovoltaic	2015		
Eurus Toyokoro Solar Park	Hokkaido		27.4	Solar photovoltaic	2015		
NISSAN Green Energy Farm in Oita	Oita		26.54	Solar photovoltaic	2013		
Sunny Solar Fukushima Central Plant	Fukushima		26.229	Solar photovoltaic	2015		
Hanwha Solar Power Kitsuki	Oita		24.47	Solar photovoltaic	2015		
Mitsui Fudosan Tomakomai Solar Power Plant	Hokkaido		23	Solar photovoltaic	2014		
Kyushu Solar Farm 7 Miyama Joint Power Station	Kyoto		22.898	Solar photovoltaic	2013		
SoftBank Kumamoto Arao Solar Park	Kumamoto		22.4	Solar photovoltaic	2015		
Ashikita Solar Power Plant (Primary・Secondary)	Kumamoto		21.52	Solar photovoltaic	2014		
The US Power Plant	Yamaguchi		21.29	Solar photovoltaic	2014		
Mitsui Engineering & Shipbuilding/Mitsui Fudosan Oita Solar Power Plant	Oita		21	Solar photovoltaic	2015		
Nippon Paper Mega Solar Komatsushima	Tokushima		21	Solar photovoltaic	2015		
Eneseed Hibiki solar power plant	Fukuoka		20.5	Solar photovoltaic	2014		
Softbank Omuta Miike Port Solar Park	Fukuoka		19.6	Solar photovoltaic	2015		
Ogishima Solar Power Plant (扇島太陽光発電所)	Kanagawa	35°29′20″N 139°43′38″E	13	Solar photovoltaic	2011		
Komekurayama Solar Power Plant (米倉山太陽光発電所)	Yamanashi	35°35′00″N 138°34′27″E	10	Solar photovoltaic	2012		
Mori			50	Geothermal	1982		
Onuma			9.5	Geothermal	1974		
Sumikawa			50	Geothermal	1995		
Matsukawa			23.5	Geothermal	1966		
Kakkonda 1 & 2			80	Geothermal	1978-1995		
Uenotai			28.8	Geothermal	1994		
Onikobe			15	Geothermal	1975		
Yanaizu-Nishiyama			65	Geothermal	1995		
Hachijo-jima			3.3	Geothermal	1999		
Suginoi			1.9	Geothermal	1981		
Takigami			25	Geothermal	1996		
Otake			12.5	Geothermal	1967		
Hatchobaru 1 & 2			112	Geothermal	1977-2006		
Kuju			0.99	Geothermal	1998		
Takenoyu			0.1	Geothermal	1991	Closed	
Kirishima-kokuksai			0.1	Geothermal	1984	Currently stopped	
Ogiri			30	Geothermal	1996		
Yamagawa			30	Geothermal	1995		
Aoyama Plateau Wind Farm (青山高原ウインドファーム)	Mie and Nara	34°42′40″N 136°17′34″E	95	Wind onshore			
Aridagawa Wind Farm (有田川ウインドファーム)	Wakayama		13	Wind onshore			
Date Wind Farm (伊達ウインドファーム)	Hokkaido		10	Wind onshore			
Enbetsu Wind Park (遠別ウインドパーク)	Hokkaido		3	Wind onshore			
Esashi Kita Wind Farm (江差北風力発電所)	Hokkaido		20	Wind onshore			
Eurus Hitz Kitanosawa Cliff Wind Farm (ユーラスヒッツ北野沢クリフ風力発電所)	Aomori		12	Wind onshore			
Hamatonbetsu Wind Farm (浜頓別ウインドファーム)	Hokkaido		4	Wind onshore			
Hohoku Wind Farm	Yamaguchi		25	Wind onshore			
Iwaya Wind Farm (岩屋ウインドファーム)	Aomori		33	Wind onshore			
Minami Awaji Wind Farm	Hyogo		38	Wind onshore			
Kamaishi Wind Farm (釜石広域ウインドファーム)	Iwate		43	Wind onshore			
Kihoku Wind Farm (輝北ウインドファーム)	Kagoshima		21	Wind onshore			
Kunimiyama Wind Farm (国見山ウインドファーム)	Kagoshima		30	Wind onshore			
Mameda Wind Farm (大豆田風力発電所)	Aomori		11	Wind onshore			
Noheji Wind Farm (野辺地ウインドファーム)	Aomori		50	Wind onshore			
Nishime Wind Farm (西目ウインドファーム)	Akita		30	Wind onshore			
Nunobiki Plateau Wind Farm (布引高原ウインドファーム)	Fukushima	37°24′15″N 140°04′06″E	69	Wind onshore			
Odanosawa Wind Farm (小田野沢ウインドファーム)	Aomori		13	Wind onshore			
Okawara Wind Farm (大川原ウインドファーム)	Tokushima		20	Wind onshore			
Satomi Bokujo Wind Farm (里美牧場風力発電所)	Ibaraki		10	Wind onshore			
Seto Windhill (瀬戸ウインドヒル発電所)	Ehime	33°26′08″N 132°13′24″E	8	Wind onshore			
Shin Izumo Wind Farm (新出雲風力発電所)	Shimane		78	Wind onshore			
Shiratakiyama Wind Farm	Yamaguchi		50	Wind onshore			
Shitsukari Wind Farm (尻労ウインドファーム)	Aomori		19	Wind onshore			
Soya Misaki Wind Farm (宗谷岬ウインドファーム)	Hokkaido		57	Wind onshore			
Summit Wind Power Sakata (サミットウインドパワー酒田発電所)	Yamagata		2	Wind onshore			
Takine Ojiroi Wind Farm (滝根小白井ウインドファーム)	Fukushima		46	Wind onshore			
Tashirotai Wind Farm (田代平風力発電所)	Akita		8	Wind onshore			
Tomamae Green Hill Wind Park (苫前グリーンヒルウインドパーク)	Hokkaido		20	Wind onshore			
Wind Power Kamisu (ウィンド・パワーかみす)	Ibaraki		14	Wind offshore			
Ishikari Bay New Port Offshore Wind Farm	Hokkaido	43°20′N 141°7′E	112	Wind offshore	2023		
Gotō City Floating Offshore Wind Farm	Nagasaki prefecture	32°39′N 128°58′E	16.8	Wind offshore	2026		

== Former power stations ==
- Senju Thermal Power Station

== See also ==
- Electricity sector in Japan
- Energy in Japan
- List of largest power stations in the world
