= Atsumi Thermal Power Station =

Thermal power station in Tahara, Aichi, Japan

Atsumi Thermal Power Station 渥美火力発電所
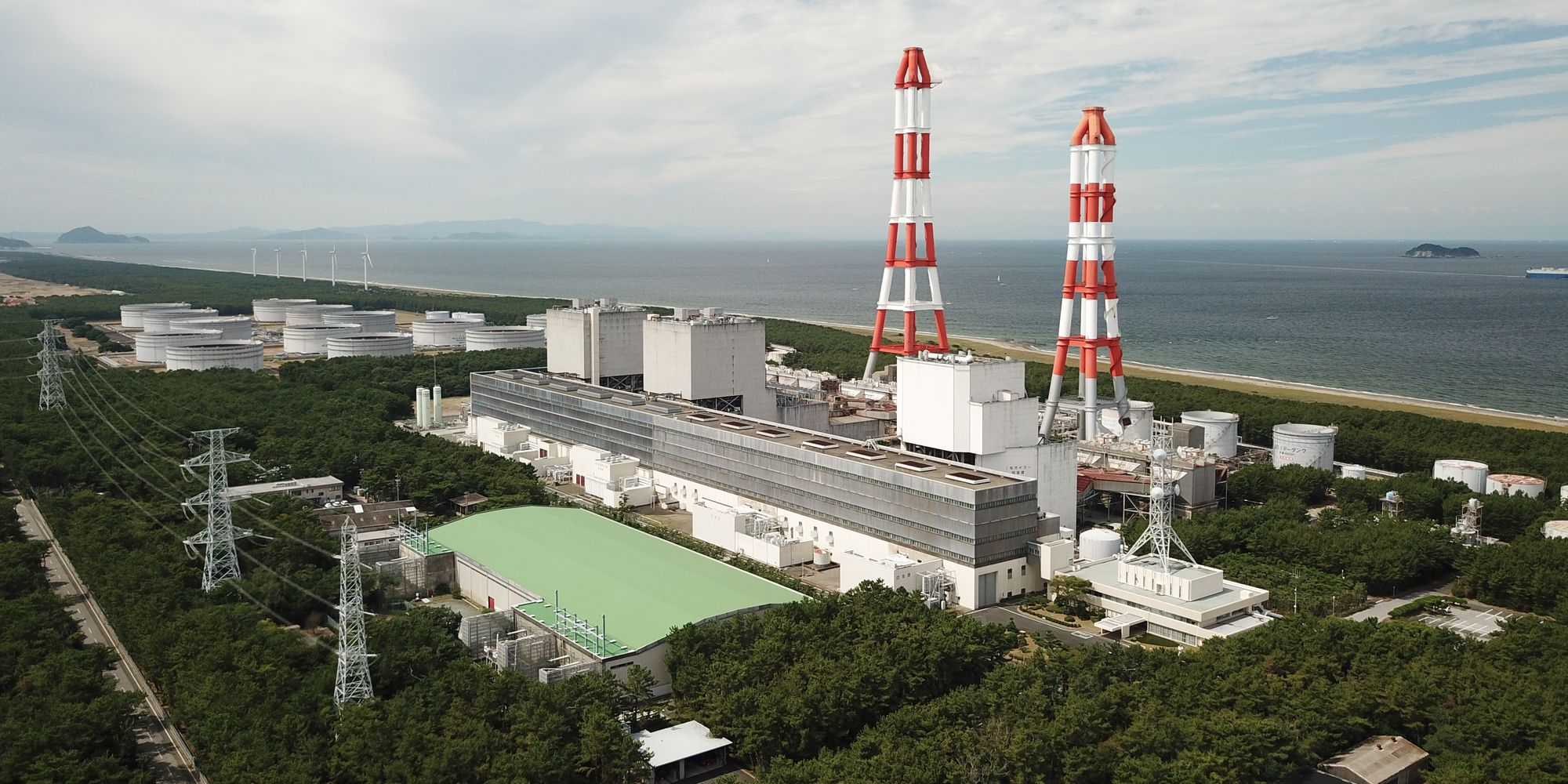
- Atsumi Thermal Power Station
- Country: Japan
- Location: Tahara, Aichi
- Coordinates: 34°39′14.8″N 137°03′59.1″E
- Status: Operational
- Commission date: 1971
- Owner: JERA
- Operator: JERA

Thermal power station
- Primary fuel: Crude Oil, Heavy Oil

Power generation
- Units operational: 2
- Units decommissioned: 2
- Nameplate capacity: 1400 MW
- Capacity factor: 42.5

External links
- Commons: Related media on Commons

Atsumi Thermal Power Station (渥美火力発電所, Atsumi Karyoku Hatsudensho) is an oil-fired thermal power station operated by JERA in the city of Tahara, Aichi, Japan. The facility is located on reclaimed land at the tip of the Atsumi Peninsula at the entrance to Mikawa Bay.

== History ==
The Atsumi Thermal Power Station was built by Chubu Electric and first came on line in 1971. A total of four generating units were completed, two in 1971 and two in 1982. Unit 1 was taken offline and mothballed in 2001 and Unit 2 was taken offline in 2004. Due to high oil prices and the cost of modernization, Unit 2 was scrapped in 2004. Unit 1 was likewise scrapped by the end of 2017. Units 3 and 4 remain in operation, but are running at very low capacity (under 25%) due to sluggish demand for electricity and lower-cost alternative sources.

== Plant details ==
Unit	Fuel	Type	Capacity	On line	Status
1	Crude Oil, Heavy Oil	Steam turbine	500 MW	1971	Offline 2001; Scrapped 2017
2	Crude Oil, Heavy Oil	Steam turbine	500 MW	1971	Offline 1971; Scrapped 2004
3	Crude Oil, Heavy Oil	Steam turbine	700 MW	1981	Operational
4	Crude Oil, Heavy Oil	Steam turbine	700 MW	1981	Operational

== See also ==
- Energy in Japan
- List of power stations in Japan
