= Kawagoe Power Station =

Gas-fired power station in Kawagoe, Mie, Japan

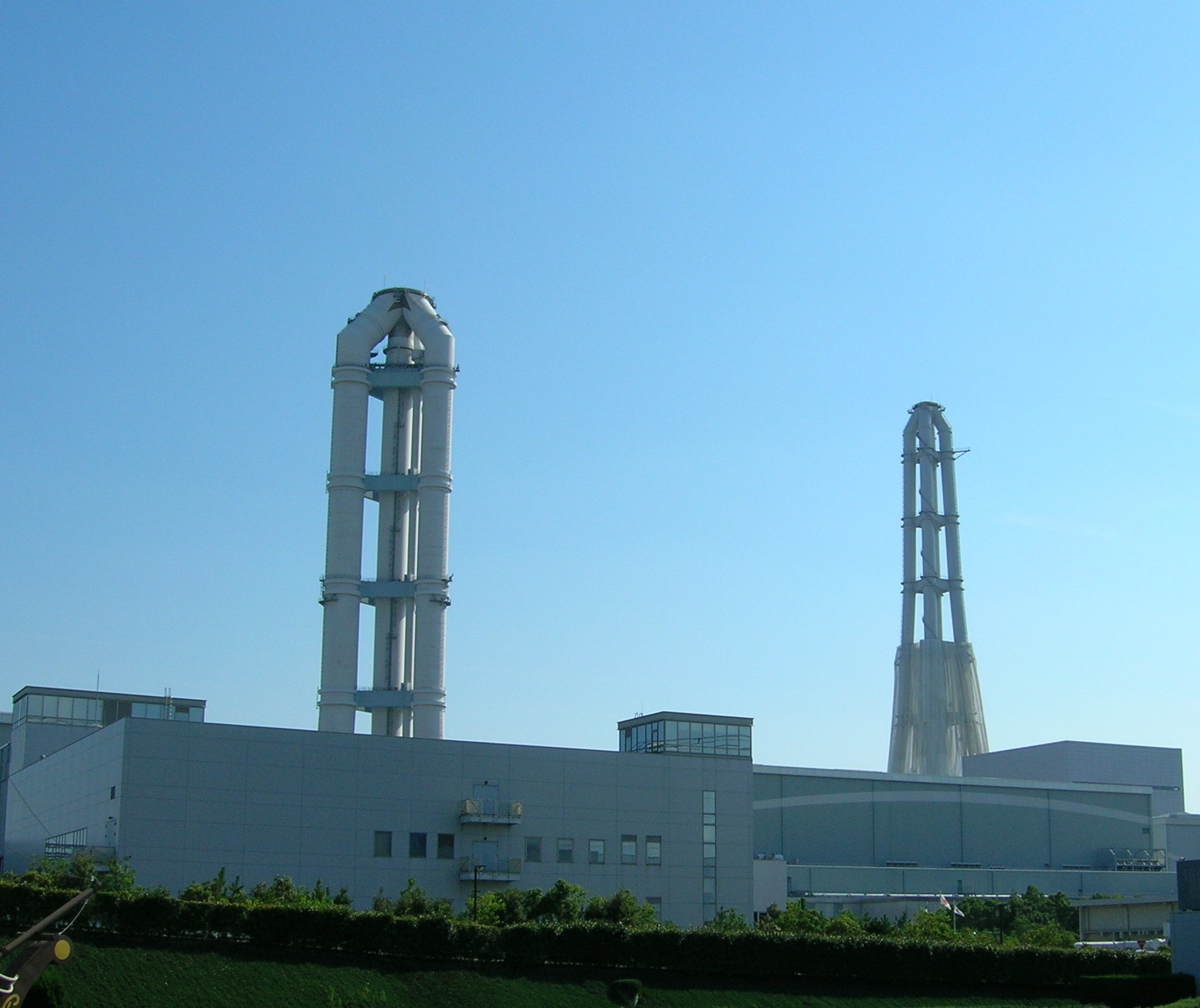
- Kawagoe Power Station, 2011
- Country: Japan
- Location: Kawagoe, Mie
- Coordinates: 35°00′25″N 136°41′20″E
- Status: Operational
- Commission date: 1997
- Owner: Chubu Electric Power
- Operator: JERA

Thermal power station
- Primary fuel: Natural gas
- Turbine technology: Steam turbine
- Combined cycle?: Yes

Power generation
- Nameplate capacity: 4,802 MW

External links
- Commons: Related media on Commons

Kawagoe Power Station (川越火力発電所, Kawagoe karyokuhatsudensho) is a large gas-fired power station in Kawagoe, Mie, Japan. The facility operates at an installed capacity of 4,802 MW, making it the fifth largest power station of its kind.

== Corporate social responsibility ==
As part of its corporate social responsibility initiatives, there is an indoor heated pool at the power station which is open to the public.

== See also ==
- List of largest power stations in the world
- List of power stations in Japan
- List of natural gas power stations
