= Oi Thermal Power Station =

Thermal power station in Japan

Oi Power Station
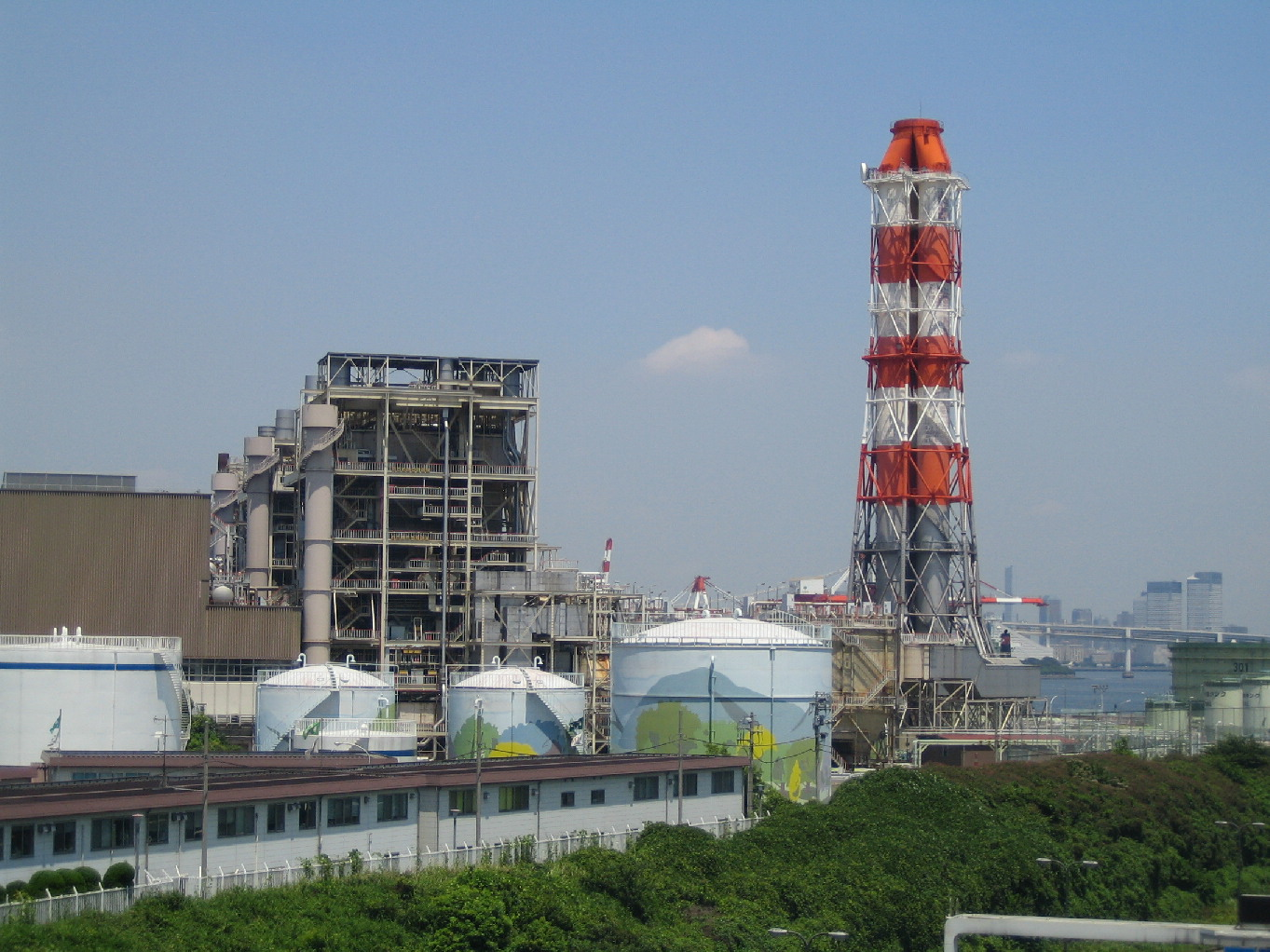
- Country: Japan
- Location: Shinagawa, Tokyo
- Coordinates: 35°36′54″N 139°45′24″E
- Status: Operational
- Commission date: 1971
- Decommission date: March 2022
- Owner: Tepco
- Operator: JERA

Thermal power station
- Primary fuel: Fuel oil

Power generation
- Units operational: 3 × 350 MW
- Nameplate capacity: 1,050 MW

External links
- Commons: Related media on Commons

Oi Power Station (大井火力発電所, Ōi karyokuhatsudensho) is a large thermal power station in Shinagawa, Tokyo, Japan. The power station generates electricity utilizing three units of 350 MW, which run on crude oil, with a total installed capacity of 1,050 MW. The first unit went online in August 1971, followed by Unit 2 in February 1972, and Unit 3 in December 1973. The facility is located on a 190 km^{2} (73 mi^{2}) site.

== See also ==
- Energy in Japan
- List of power stations in Japan
