= Hirono Thermal Power Station =

Fossil-fuel power station in Hirono, Fukushima, Japan

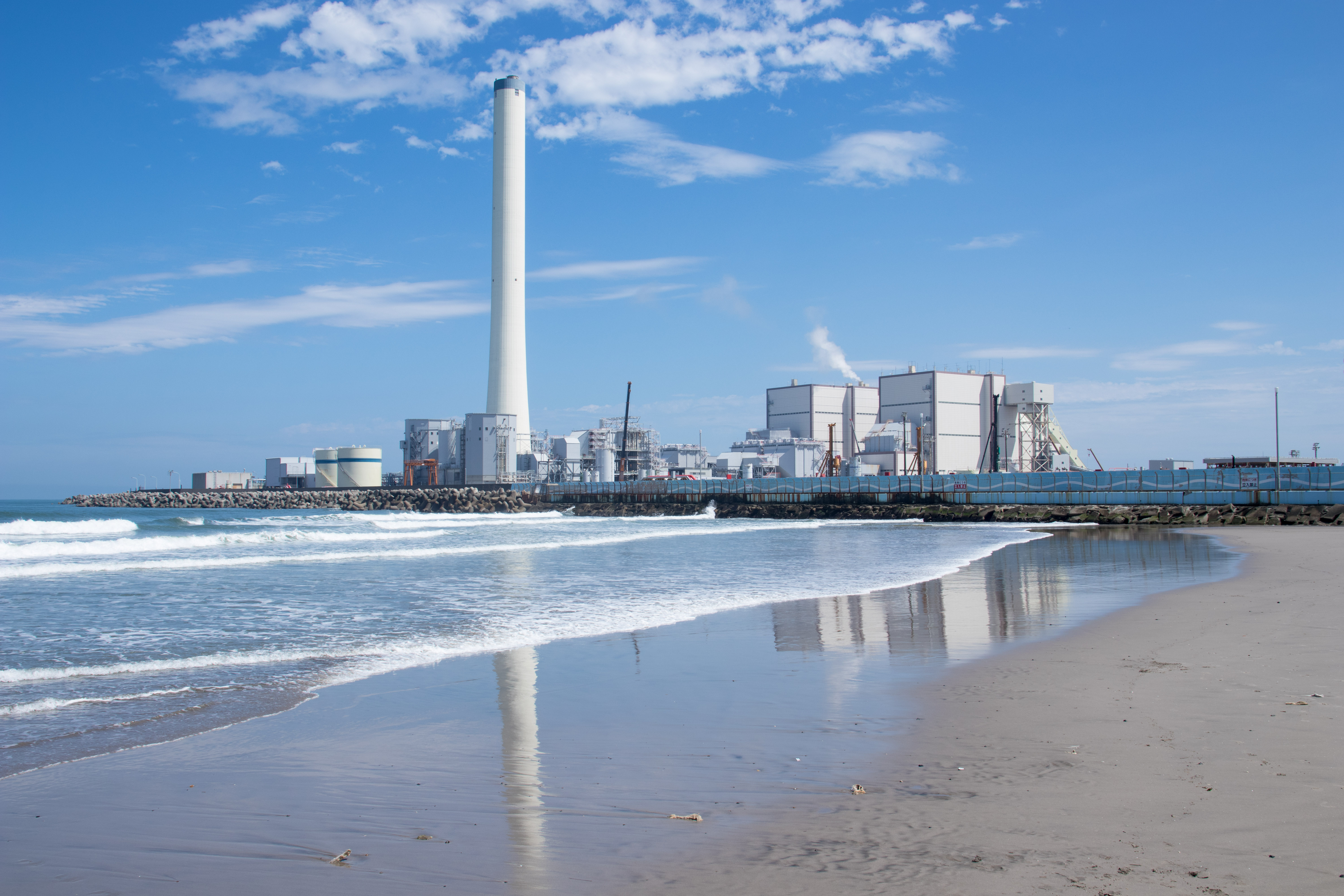
- Hirono Thermal Power Station
- Hirono Thermal Power Station
- Official name: 広野火力発電所
- Country: Japan
- Location: Hirono, Fukushima
- Coordinates: 37°14′18″N 141°01′04″E
- Status: Operational
- Commission date: April 1980
- Owner: JERA
- Operator: JERA

Thermal power station
- Primary fuel: Fuel oil, Crude oil
- Secondary fuel: Coal
- Site area: 1.33 million sq.m.

Power generation
- Units operational: 3 (+3 long-term offline)
- Nameplate capacity: 4400 MW

External links
- Website: www.jera.co.jp/business/thermal-power/list/hirono
- Commons: Related media on Commons

Hirono Thermal Power Station (広野火力発電所, Hirono karyoku hatsudensho) is a fossil-fuel power station operated by JERA in the town of Hirono, Fukushima, Japan. It is located on the Pacific coast and is currently the seventh largest thermal power station in Japan.

== History ==
The Hirono Thermal Power Station came on line with Unit 1 in April 1980, followed by Unit 2 in July 1980. Unit 3 came on line in June 1989, followed by Unit 4 in January 1993. The plant was constructed on the assumption that natural gas would be supplied from the offshore Iwaki gas field; however, the amount of gas produced proved to be insufficient, and Units 3 and 4, which used to mix oil and natural gas, became oil-only. Construction began on Units 5 and 6 in August 1999, but with coal for fuel. These units were completed in July 2004 and December 2013 respectively. Production of natural gas from the Iwaki-Oki gas field ended in July 2007.

The power plant located directly at the Pacific Ocean was damaged by the 2011 Tōhoku earthquake and tsunami. Tepco managed to return the first block to operation in July 2011.

The plant had an installed capacity of 4,400 MW. Power is generated by three 600 MW units, and two 1,000 MW units. Units 1 to 4 run on fuel oil and crude oil, whereas unit 5 (600 MW) runs on coal. A new 600 MW coal-fired unit, Unit 6, commenced commercial operation in December, 2013.

The long-term shutdown of Unit 1 was scheduled for April 1, 2016. After that, the long-term planned suspension of Units 3 and 4 began on July 1, 2018.

On May 15, 2014, TEPCO announced a plan to construct the world's most advanced integrated coal gasification combined cycle (IGCC) facility on the premises of the Fukushima Reconstruction Large Coal Gasification Combined Cycle Power Plant demonstration project On October 20, 2016, the plan was taken over by Hirono IGCC Power LLC (a joint-venture of Mitsubishi Power, Mitsubishi Heavy Industries, Mitsubishi Electric, and TEPCO Holdings).

== Plant details ==
Unit	Fuel	Type	Capacity	On line	Status
1	Heavy Oil/Crude Oil	Super critical Steam turbine	600 MW	April 1980	Long-term off-line April 2016
2	Heavy Oil/Crude Oil	Super-critical Steam Turbine	600 MW	July 1980	operational
3	Heavy Oil/Crude Oil	Super critical Steam turbine	1000 MW	June 1989	Long-term off-line July 2018
4	Heavy Oil/Crude Oil	Super critical Steam turbine	1000 MW	January 1993	Long-term off-line July 2018
5	Coal	Ultra-critical Steam Turbine	600 MW	July 2004	operational
6	Coal	Ultra-critical Steam Turbine	600 MW	December 2013	operational
7	Coal	IGCC	540 MW	est. September 2021	under construction

== See also ==
- List of fuel oil power stations
- List of largest power stations in the world
- List of power stations in Japan
