= Hekinan Thermal Power Station =

Thermal power station in Hekinan, Aichi, Japan

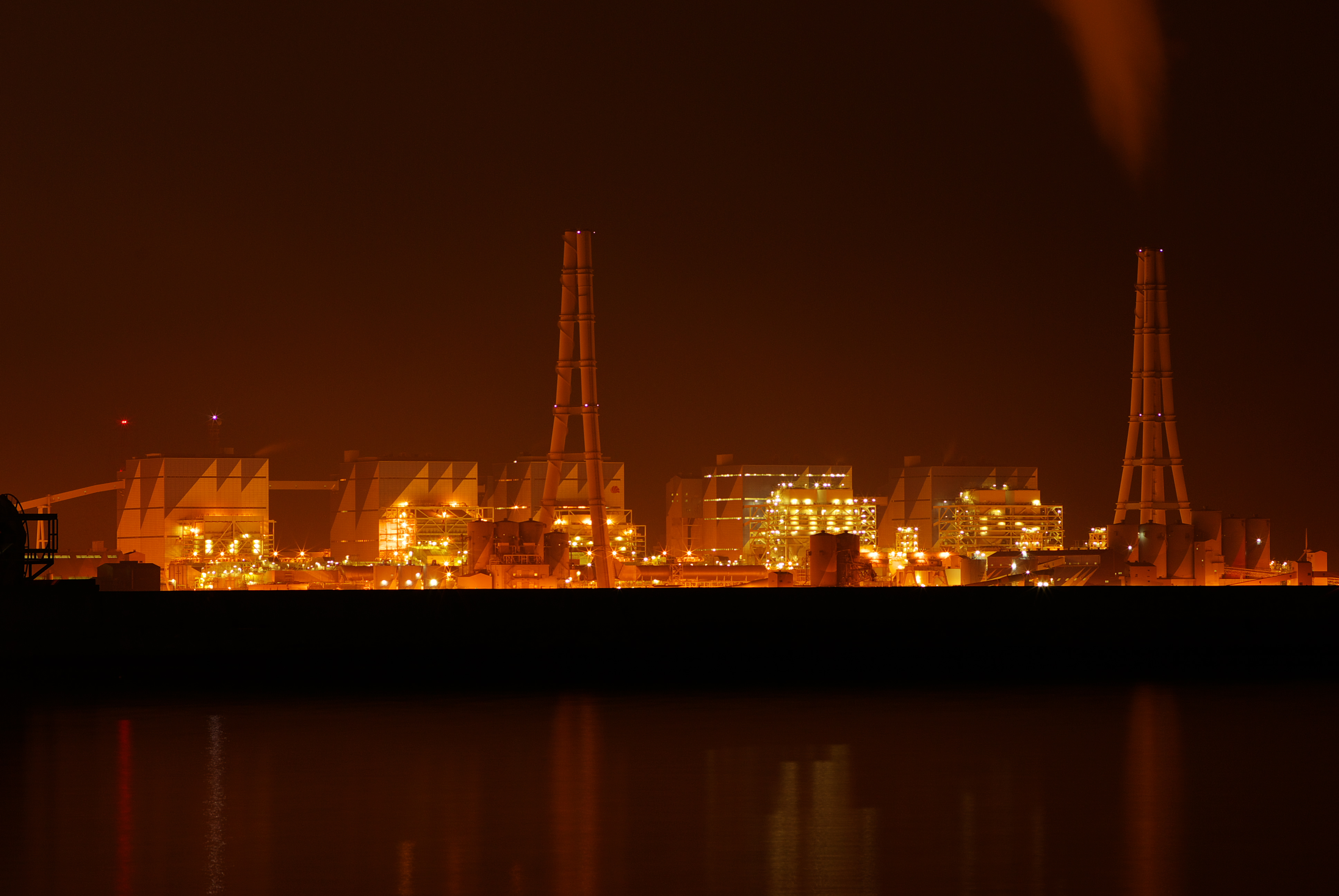
- Hekinan coal-fired power plant at night
- Country: Japan
- Location: Hekinan, Aichi
- Coordinates: 34°50′7.0″N 136°57′43.9″E
- Status: Operational
- Commission date: 1991
- Owner: JERA
- Operator: JERA

Thermal power station
- Primary fuel: Coal
- Site area: 1.6 million sq.m.

Power generation
- Units operational: 5
- Nameplate capacity: 4100 MW

External links
- Website: Official website
- Commons: Related media on Commons

Hekinan Thermal Power Station (碧南火力発電所, Hekinan Karyoku Hatsudensho) is a large thermal power station operated by JERA in the city of Hekinan, Aichi, Japan. The facility is located the head of the Chita Peninsula and is the largest coal-fired power station in Japan. The plant is estimated to have been one of the ten most carbon polluting coal-fired power plants in the world in 2018, at 26.64 million tons of carbon dioxide, and relative emissions are estimated at 1.394 kg per kWh.

== General information ==
The power plant was built by Chubu Electric to meet base load demand on reclaimed land on the west coast of Kinuura Bay approximately 40 kilometers south of the city of Nagoya. Its grounds cover 1.6 million square meters. The total generating capacity is 4100 MW. The first unit went online in October 1991.

In April 2019, all thermal power plant operations of Chubu Electric Power were transferred to JERA, a joint venture between Chubu Electric and TEPCO Fuel & Power, Inc, a subsidiary of Tokyo Electric Power Company. JERA plans to co-fire the burners with 20% ammonia from 2021 to 2025.

== Plant details ==
Unit	Fuel	Type	Capacity	On line	Status
1	Coal	Steam turbine	700 MW	Oct 18 1991	operational
2	Coal	Steam turbine	700 MW	Jun 12 1992	operational
3	Coal	Steam turbine	700 MW	Apr 22 1993	operational
4	Coal	Steam turbine	1000 MW	Nov 2001	operational
5	Coal	Steam turbine	1000 MW	Nov 2002	operational

== See also ==
- Energy in Japan
- List of power stations in Japan
