= Kashima Power Station =

Power station in Kamisu, Ibaraki, Japan

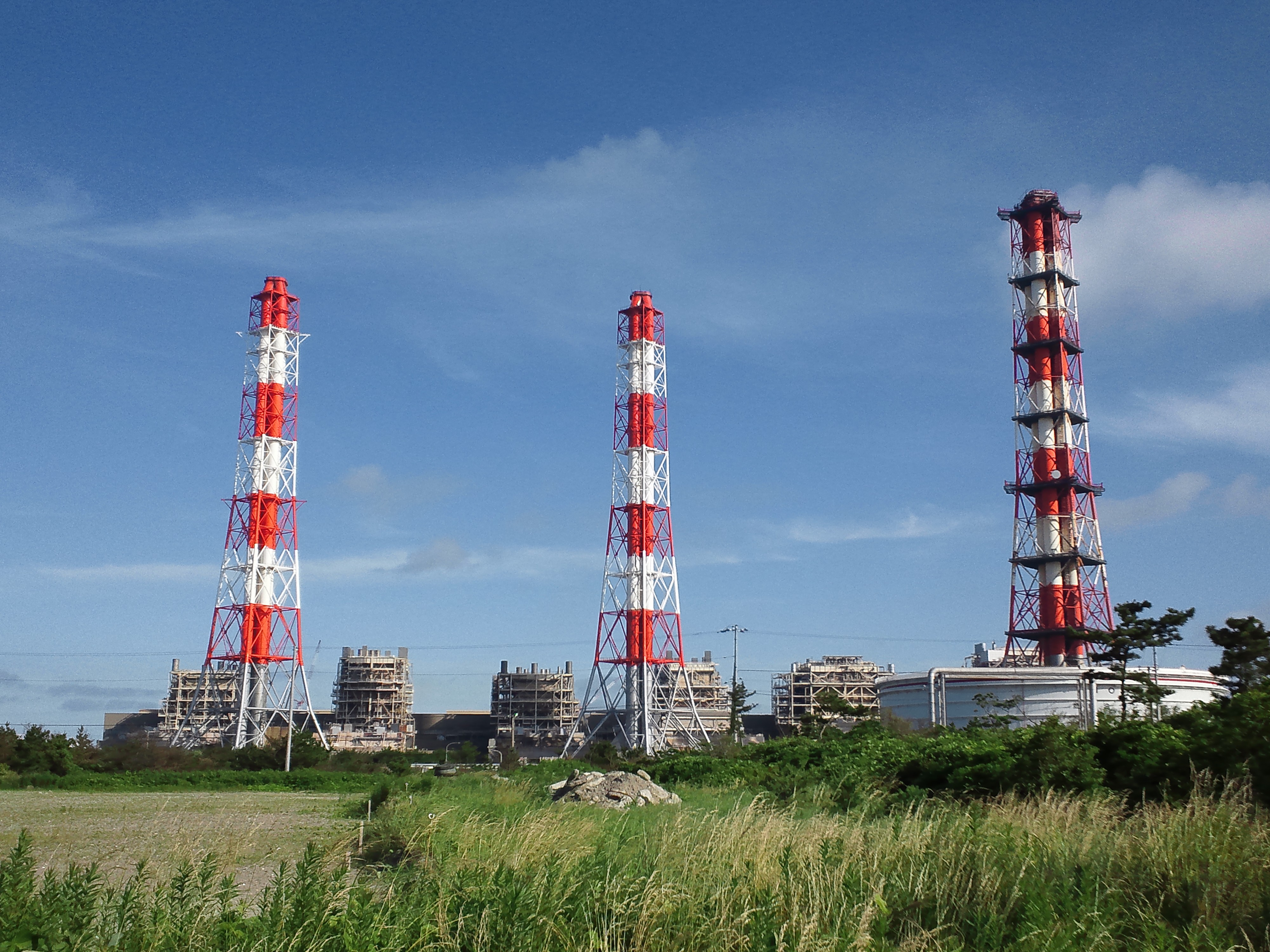
- Country: Japan
- Location: Kamisu, Ibaraki
- Coordinates: 35°52′47″N 140°41′22″E
- Status: Operational
- Commission date: 1971
- Owner: Tepco
- Operator: JERA

Thermal power station
- Primary fuel: Fuel oil city gas
- Turbine technology: Steam turbine (Units 1-6); Advanced combined cycle gas turbine (Units 7a-c)

Power generation
- Units operational: 4 × 600 MW (suspended); 2 × 1,000 MW; 3 × 420 MW
- Nameplate capacity: 5,660 MW (3,260 MW active, 2,400 MW suspended indefinitely)

Kashima Power Station (鹿島火力発電所, Kashima karyokuhatsudensho) is a large oil-fired and gas-fired power station in Kamisu, Ibaraki, Japan. The facility operates with an installed capacity of 5,660 MW, making it one of the largest fossil-fueled power station in the world. The plant includes four oil-fired steam turbines rated at 600 MW, two oil-fired steam turbines rated at 1,000 MW, and three advanced combined cycle gas turbines rated at 420 MW added in 2014. As of April 2016, the four oil-fired 600 MW turbines have been suspended indefinitely. The plant features 3 lattice stacks, including the tallest steel chimney in the world at 231m (758 ft). In March 2023, JERA announced plans to decommission all six oil-fired steam turbines (Unit 5 & Unit 6 had been shut down since 2020).

== See also ==
- List of largest power stations in the world
- List of power stations in Japan
- Lattice tower
