= Shin-Nagoya Thermal Power Station =

Thermal power station in Nagoya, Aichi Prefecture, Japan

Shin-Nagoya Thermal Power Station 新名古屋火力発電所
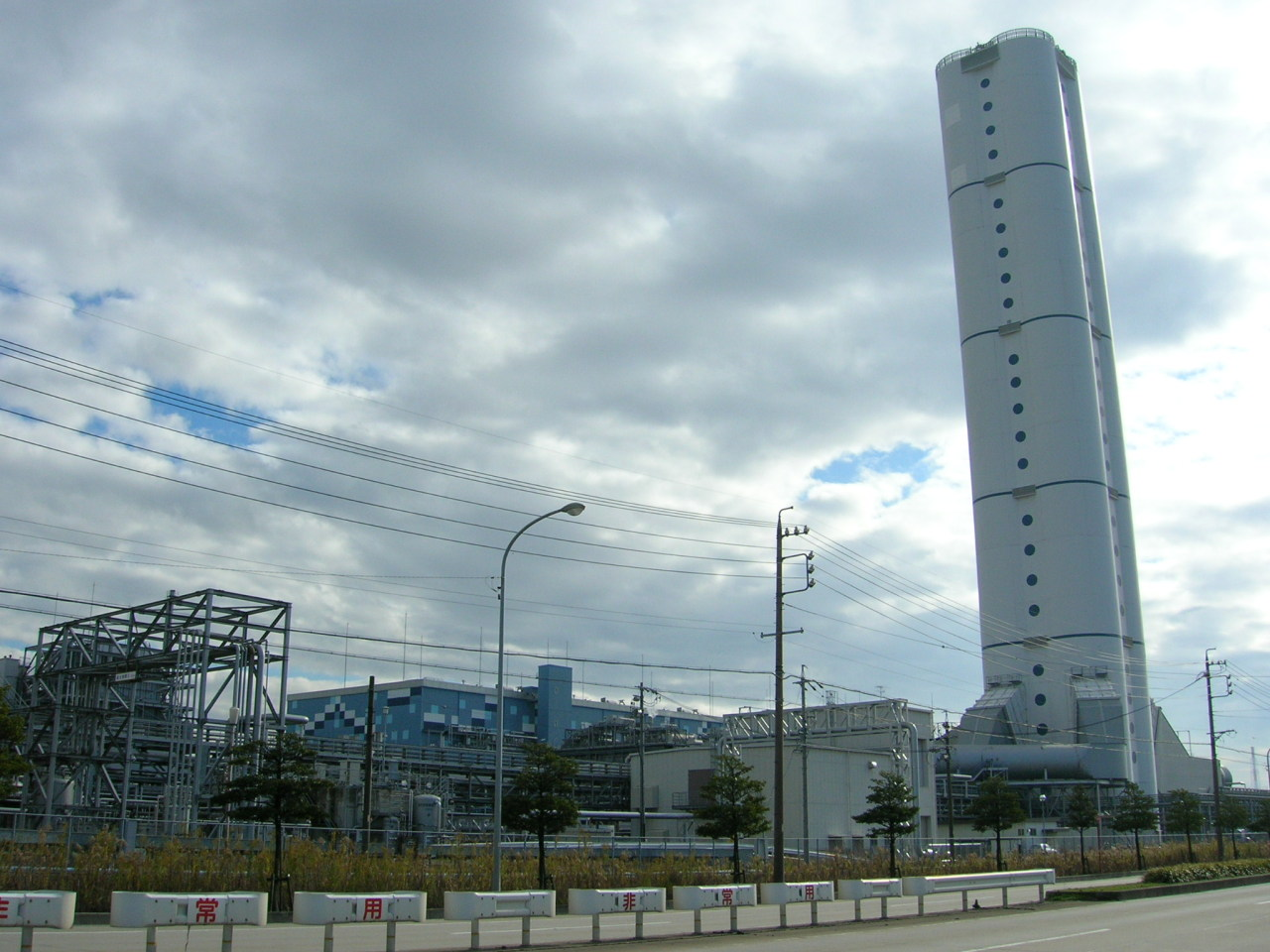
- Shin-Nagoya Thermal Power Station Unit 7
- Country: Japan
- Location: Minato-ku, Nagoya, Aichi Prefecture
- Coordinates: 35°3′50.56″N 136°52′36.97″E
- Status: Operational
- Commission date: 1959
- Owner: JERA
- Operator: JERA

Thermal power station
- Primary fuel: LNG
- Site area: 426,111 sq.m.

Power generation
- Units operational: 2
- Units decommissioned: 6
- Nameplate capacity: 3058 MW

External links
- Website: Official website

Shin-Nagoya Thermal Power Station (新名古屋火力発電所, Shin-Nagoya Karyoku Hatsudensho) is a thermal power station operated by JERA in the Minato Ward of the city of Nagoya, Aichi Prefecture, Japan. The facility is located at the northern end of Chita Peninsula.

== History ==
The Shin-Nagoya Thermal power Station is the only power plant located within the city limits of Nagoya, and provides much of the city's electricity for ordinary homes. Unit 1 started operation as a coal-fired power plant in 1959, and Units 2 through 6 were built by 1964, reaching a total output of 12,560 MW, making it the largest power plant in Asia at that time. All six units were converted from coal to heavy oil in 1972. Units 1 through 4 were abolished in 1992 as their equipment reach the end of is operational life, as were Units 5 and 6 in 2002. Unit 7 was completed in 1996 as an Advanced Combined Cycle system (ACC) using LNG as fuel with a 1300 deg C combustion temperature, driving six gas and six steam turbines. Unit 8 was built between 2005 and 2008 as a More Advanced Combined Cycle system (MACC) using LNG as fuel with a 1500 deg C combustion temperature, driving four gas turbines and four steam turbines.。

In April 2019, all thermal power plant operations of Chubu Electric Power were transferred to JERA, a joint venture between Chubu Electric and TEPCO Fuel & Power, Inc, a subsidiary of Tokyo Electric Power Company.

== Plant details ==
Unit	Fuel	Type	Capacity	On line	Status
1	Coal (to 1972); Heavy Oil	Steam turbine	156 MW	1959	Scrapped 1992
2	Coal (to 1972); Heavy Oil	Steam turbine	220 MW	1961	Scrapped 1992
3	Coal (to 1972); Heavy Oil	Steam turbine	220 MW	1962	Scrapped 1992
4	Coal (to 1972); Heavy Oil	Steam turbine	220 MW	1963	Scrapped 1992
5	Coal (to 1972); Heavy Oil	Steam turbine	220 MW	1963	Scrapped 1992
6	Coal (to 1972); Heavy Oil	Steam turbine	220 MW	1964	Scrapped 1992
7	Natural Gas	ACC	1458 MW	Dec 1998	operational
8	Natural Gas	MACC	1600 MW	2008	operational

== See also ==
- Energy in Japan
- List of power stations in Japan
