= Anegasaki Power Station =

Power station in Ichihara, Chiba, Japan

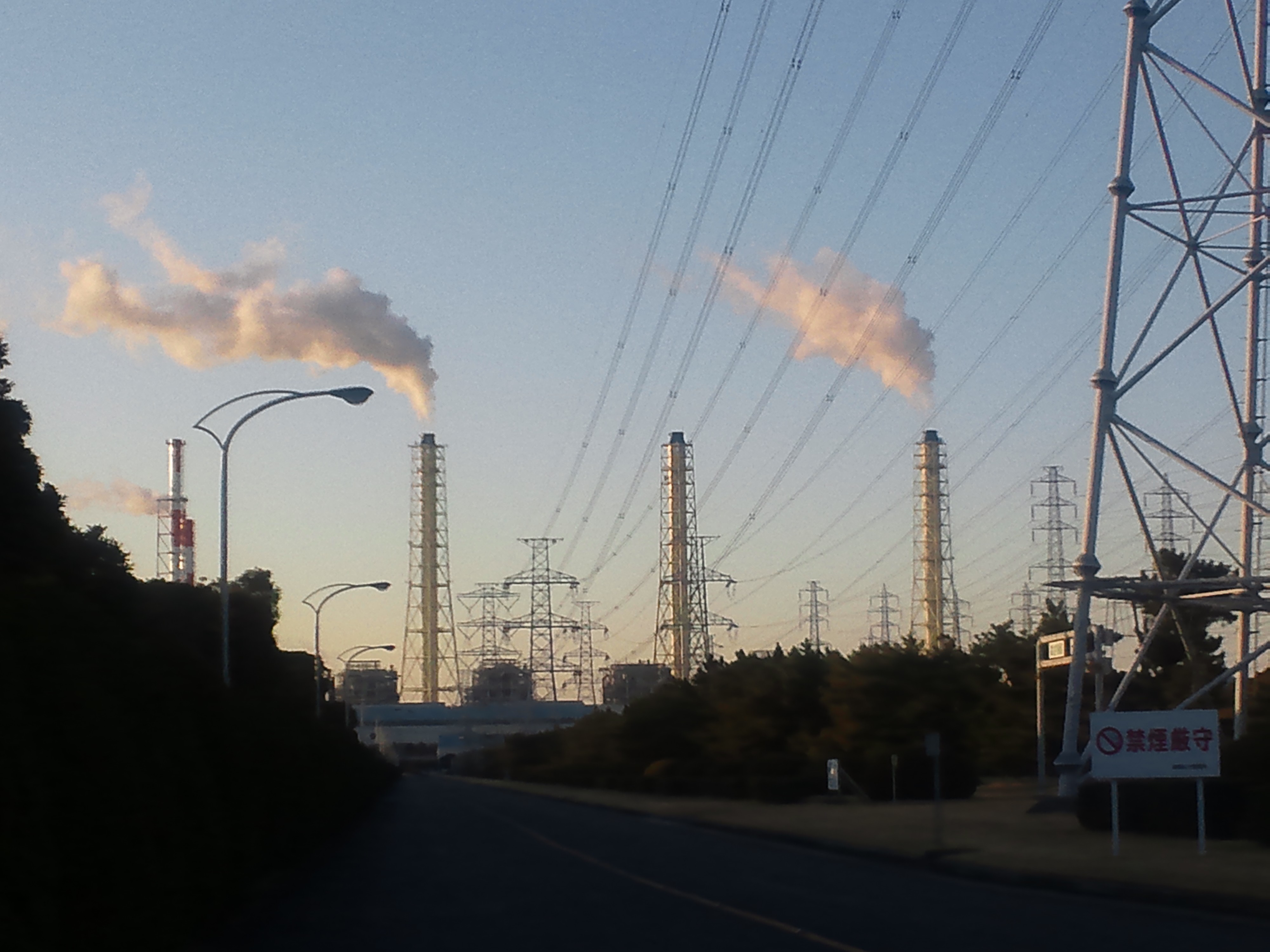
- Country: Japan
- Location: Ichihara, Chiba, Japan
- Coordinates: 35°29′06″N 140°01′00″E
- Status: Operational
- Owner: Tepco
- Operator: JERA

Thermal power station
- Primary fuel: Natural gas
- Tertiary fuel: LPG; Crude oil Fuel oil
- Turbine technology: Steam turbine

Power generation
- Units operational: 6 × 600MW
- Nameplate capacity: 3,600 MW

Anegasaki Power Station (姉崎火力発電所, Anegasaki karyokuhatsudensho) is a large power station in Ichihara, Chiba, Japan. The facility operates with an installed capacity of 3,600 MW. Power is generated by six turbines rated at 600 MW. The station utilizes six 600 MW units, which use the following types of fuel.

- Unit 1: Natural gas, fuel oil, crude oil
- Unit 2: Natural gas, fuel oil, crude oil
- Unit 3: Natural gas, fuel oil, crude oil, LPG
- Unit 4: Natural gas, fuel oil, crude oil, LPG
- Unit 5: Natural gas, LPG
- Unit 6: Natural gas, LPG

== See also ==
- List of largest power stations in the world
- List of power stations in Japan
