= Futtsu Power Station =

Gas-fired power station in Futtsu, Japan

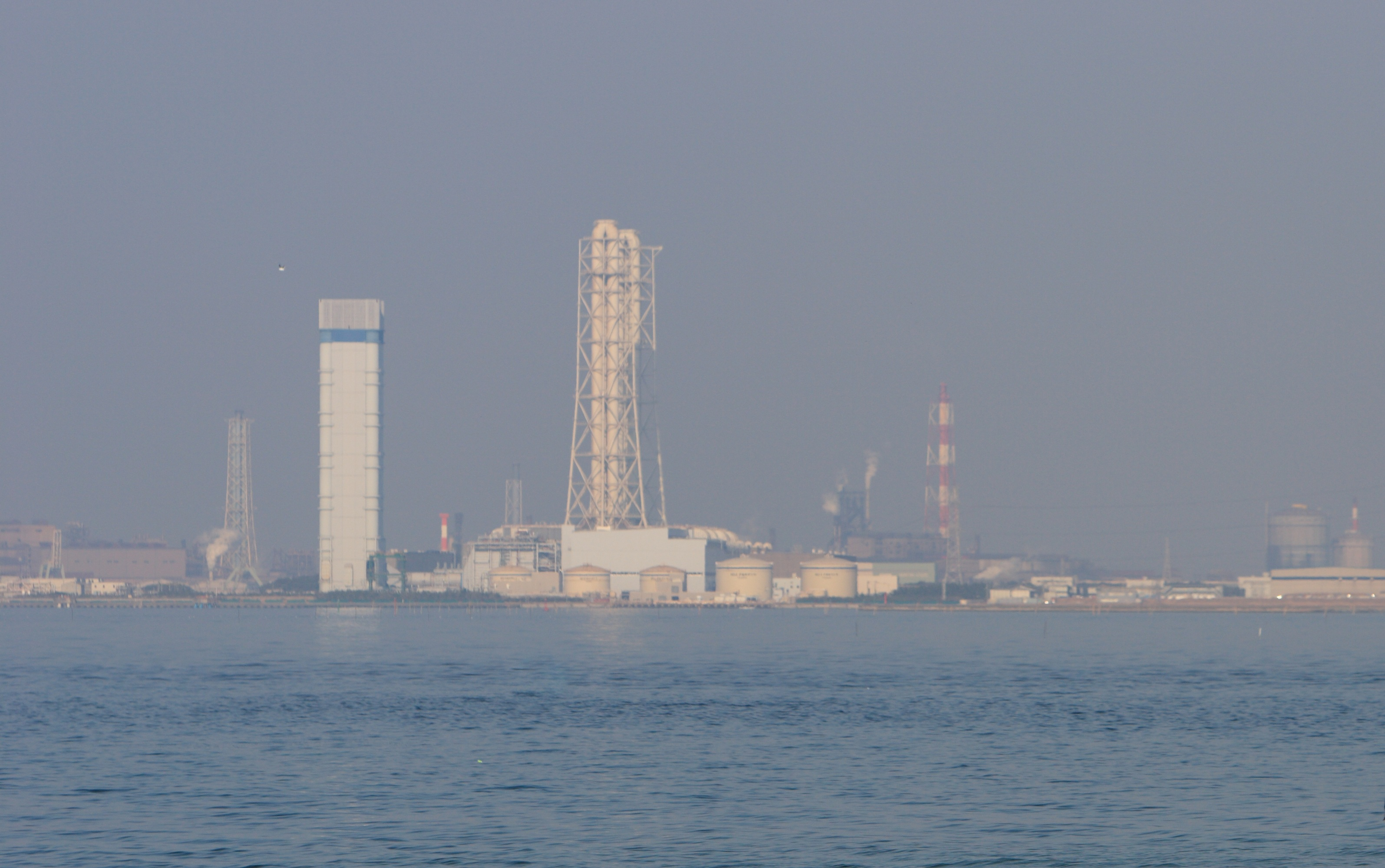
- Country: Japan
- Location: Futtsu, Chiba
- Coordinates: 35°20′35″N 139°50′02″E
- Status: Operational
- Owner: Tepco
- Operator: JERA

Thermal power station
- Primary fuel: Natural gas

Power generation
- Units operational: 2 × 1,520 MW; 2 × 1,000 MW
- Nameplate capacity: 5,040 MW

External links
- Commons: Related media on Commons

The Futtsu Power Station (富津火力発電所) is the fourth largest gas-fired power station in the world, located in Futtsu, Japan. The power station operates at 5,040 MW by utilizing four groups of units, with 14 combined cycle units, 4 advanced combined cycle units, and 3 more advanced combined cycle units (high temperature combined cycle). All four units run on natural gas. The facility is owned by Tepco.

== See also ==
- List of largest power stations in the world
- List of natural gas power stations
- List of power stations in Japan
