= Eurus Rokkasho Solar Park =

Power plant in Aomori Prefecture, Japan

- Country: Japan
- Location: Rokkasho; Aomori Prefecture; Japan
- Coordinates: 40.9277°N 141.3623°E
- Status: Operational
- Construction began: August 2013
- Commission date: 1 October 2015
- Owner: Eurus Energy
- Operator: Eurus Technical Service Corporation

Solar farm
- Type: Standard PV
- Collectors: 510,000
- Site area: 253 hectares

Power generation
- Nameplate capacity: 148 MW

Eurus Rokkasho Solar Park (ユーラス六ヶ所ソーラーパーク) is a solar power generating station in the Mutsu-Ogawara Industrial Park, Rokkasho, Aomori Prefecture, Japan. Comprising two solar fields about five kilometres apart from one another, the facility has a nameplate capacity of 148 MW, and a "grid capacity" of 115 MW. It was previously the largest operational solar plant in Japan, but has since been surpassed in size.

== History ==
Construction began in August 2013. The power plant was engineered and constructed by Shimizu Corporation. It was commissioned on 1 October 2015.

== Facilities ==
The station occupies 253 hectares of land on two different sites about five kilometres apart. The inland "Chitosedairakita Area" (40.8975°N 141.2810°E) generates about 55MW. The "Takahoko Area" (40.9277°N 141.3623°E), near the ocean, generates about 60MW. This amounts to a total of 115 MW contributed to the power grid. The power plant's solar panels have a nameplate capacity of 148 MW.

Altogether, the plant comprises approximately 510,000 solar panels. Electricity generated from both sites is carried to the Rokkasho transformer station of Tohoku Electric Power. The plant uses single-crystal silicon photovoltaic cells made by Mitsubishi Electric and SunPower.

There is also a visitor's centre.

== Ownership and operations ==
The plant is owned by Eurus Rokkasho Solar Park Corporation, a subsidiary of the commercial energy producer Eurus Energy. It is maintained and operated by Eurus Technical Service Corporation.

== See also ==
- List of power stations in Japan
- Solar power in Japan
