= Sodegaura Power Station =

Power station in Sodegaura, Japan

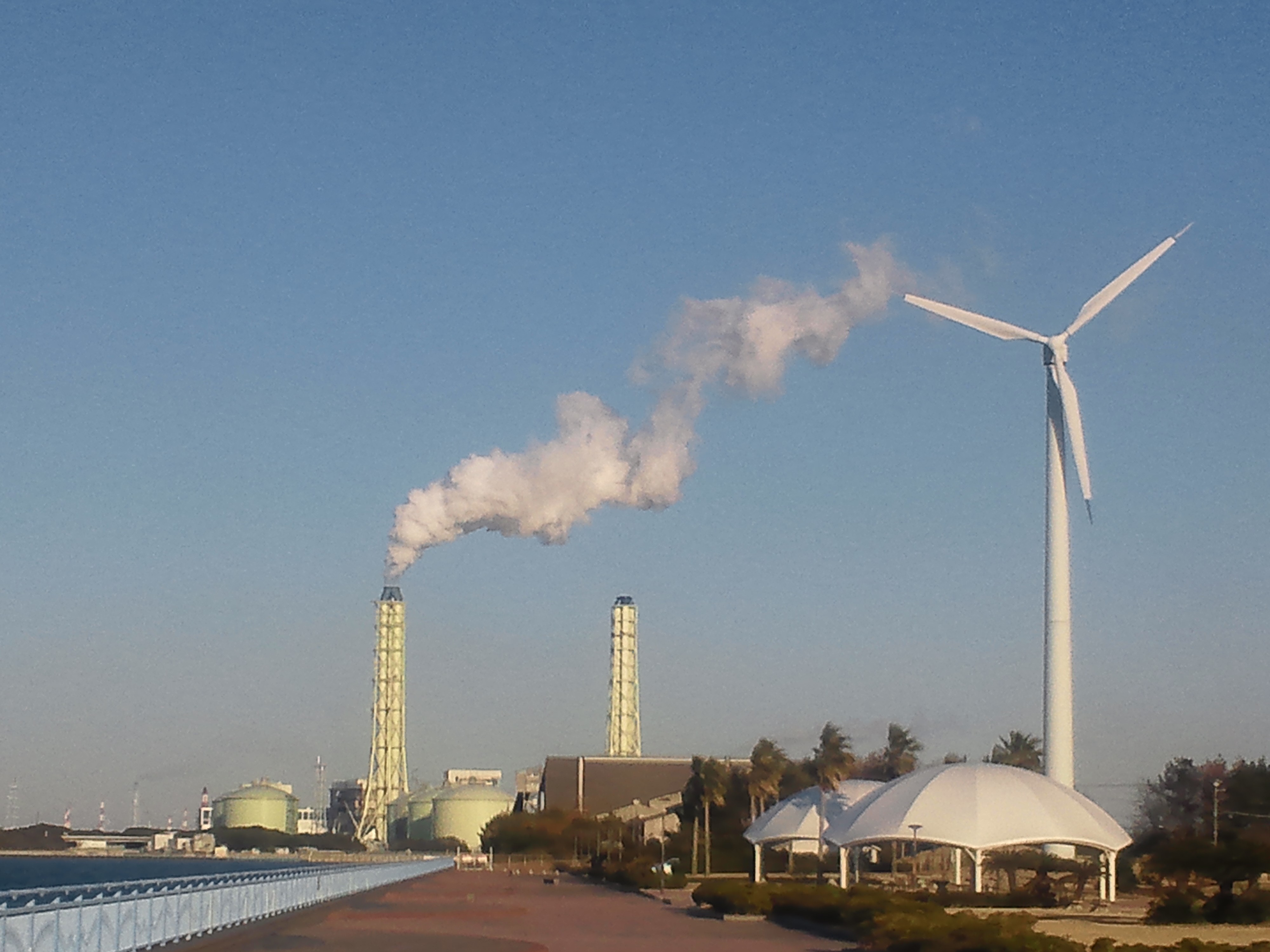
- Country: Japan
- Location: Sodegaura
- Coordinates: 35°27′45″N 139°58′37″E
- Status: Operational
- Owner: Tepco
- Operator: JERA

Thermal power station
- Primary fuel: Natural gas

Power generation
- Units operational: 1 × 600 MW; 3 × 1,000 MW
- Nameplate capacity: 3,600 MW

The Sodegaura Power Station (袖ケ浦火力発電所) is a large gas-fired power station in Sodegaura, Chiba Prefecture, Japan. The facility generates power by utilizing one 600 MW and three 1,000 MW units, thus operating at an installed capacity of 3,600 MW, making it one of the largest power stations of its kind. All units of this facility run on natural gas.

== See also ==
- List of largest power stations in the world
- List of power stations in Japan
