= Okuyoshino Pumped Storage Power Station =

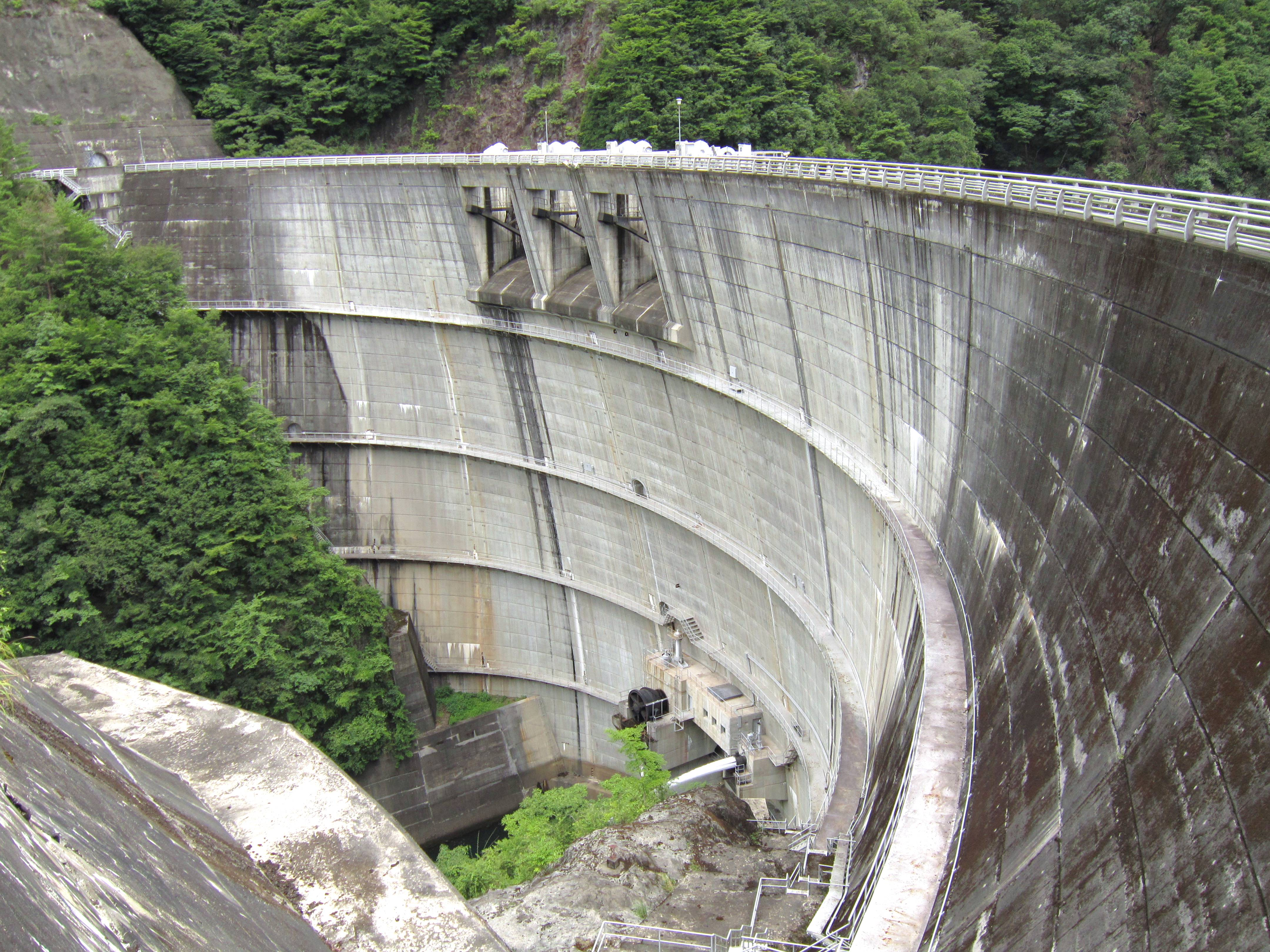
- The Asahi Dam which forms the lower reservoir
- Country: Japan
- Location: Totsukawa
- Coordinates: 34°7′4″N 135°49′16″E
- Status: Operational
- Construction began: 1971
- Opening date: 1980
- Owner(s): Kansai Electric Power Company (KEPCO)

Upper reservoir
- Creates: Seto Reservoir
- Total capacity: 1,685,000,000 m^{3} (1,366,000 acre⋅ft)

Lower reservoir
- Creates: Asahi Reservoir
- Total capacity: 1,692,000,000 m^{3} (1,372,000 acre⋅ft)

Power Station
- Hydraulic head: 505 m (1,657 ft)
- Pump-generators: 6 x 201 MW (270,000 hp) Francis pump-turbines
- Installed capacity: 1,206 MW (1,617,000 hp)

The Okuyoshino Pumped Storage Power Station (奥吉野発電所) is located 15 kilometres (9.3 mi) north of Totsukawa in Nara Prefecture, Japan. Using the pumped-storage hydroelectric method, the power plant has an installed capacity of 1,206 megawatts (1,617,000 hp). To accomplish power generation, the power station shifts water between two reservoirs, the lower Asahi Reservoir and the upper Seto Reservoir. Construction on both the Asahi and Seto Dams began in 1971 and was complete in 1978. The power station was commissioned in 1980. Due to heavy sediment and turbidity in the Seto Reservoir, caused by logging and landslides upstream, a sediment bypass tunnel was constructed between 1992 and 1998.

== Design and operation ==
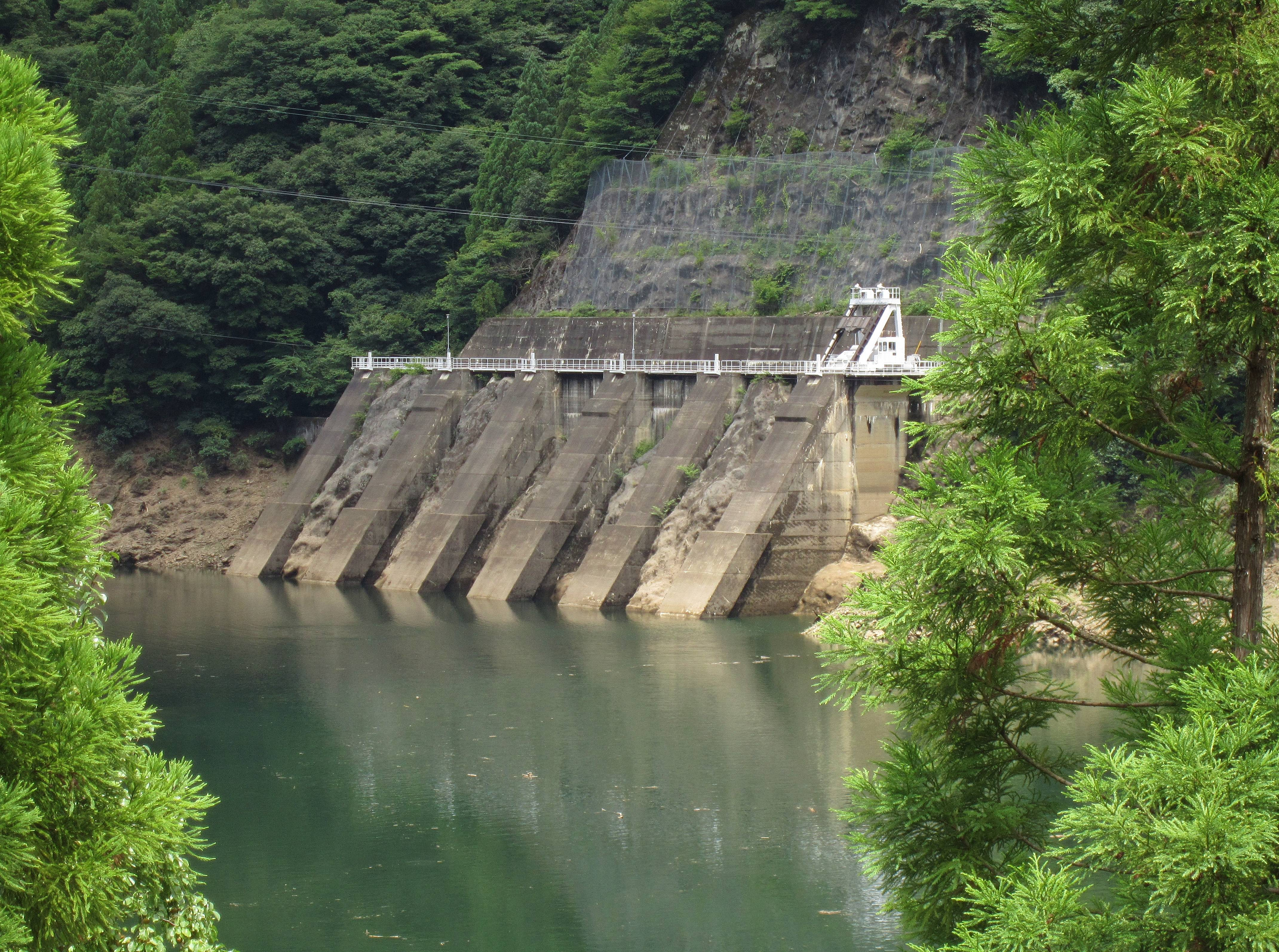
Intake and outflow structure for the power station, located on the northern edge of Asahi Reservoir

=== Asahi Dam ===
The lower reservoir is created by the Asahi Dam which is a 86.1 metres (282 ft) tall and 199.41 metres (654.2 ft) long arch dam on the Asahi River of the Shingu River system. Its catchment area covers an area of 39.2 square kilometres (15.1 sq mi) and the surface of the reservoir covers 52 hectares (130 acres). The lower reservoir's storage capacity is 1,685,000,000 cubic metres (1,366,000 acre⋅ft) of which 1,250,000,000 cubic metres (1,010,000 acre⋅ft) is active (or usable) for pumping up to the lower reservoir.

=== Seto Dam ===
Creating the upper reservoir in a valley above the lower is the Seto Dam. It is a 110.5-metre (363 ft) tall and 342.8-metre (1,125 ft) long rock-fill embankment dam with 3,740,000 cubic metres (4,890,000 cu yd) of fill. Its catchment area covers a much smaller area of 2.9 square kilometres (1.1 sq mi) and its surface covers 52 hectares (130 acres). The upper reservoir has a storage capacity of 1,692,000,000 cubic metres (1,372,000 acre⋅ft) of which 1,250,000,000 cubic metres (1,010,000 acre⋅ft) is useful for power generation down at the power station.

During periods of low demand when electricity is cheap, the power station pumps water from the lower reservoir to the upper. When energy demand is high, the water is released back down to the power station through the same tunnels to generate electricity. Additionally, the six 201 megawatts (270,000 hp) Francis pump-turbine-generators are reversible and serve to both pump water and generate electricity. The pumping and generation process is repeated as needed and although the power station consumes more electricity pumping than it does generating, pumping occurs when electricity is cheap and generating when it is expensive; making the power station economical. The difference in elevation between the two reservoirs affords a hydraulic head of 505 metres (1,657 ft).

=== Sediment bypass tunnel ===
To allow sediment to pass the lower Seto Reservoir, a bypass tunnel was constructed. The tunnel itself is hood-shaped and 2,350 metres (7,710 ft) long. It passes through rock on the north side of the reservoir. The intake for the tunnel is controlled by a 13.5 metres (44 ft) tall and 45 metres (148 ft) long weir located 2.5 metres (8 ft 2 in) upstream of the dam. The weir is used to divert sediment-laden river water into the tunnel or to let it flow into the reservoir. The tunnel can divert a maximum of 140 cubic metres per second (4,900 cu ft/s) of water and discharges downstream of the Seto Dam.

== See also ==
- List of pumped-storage hydroelectric power stations
- List of power stations in Japan
