= Omarugawa Pumped Storage Power Station =

Coordinates: 32.2478°N 131.3735°E

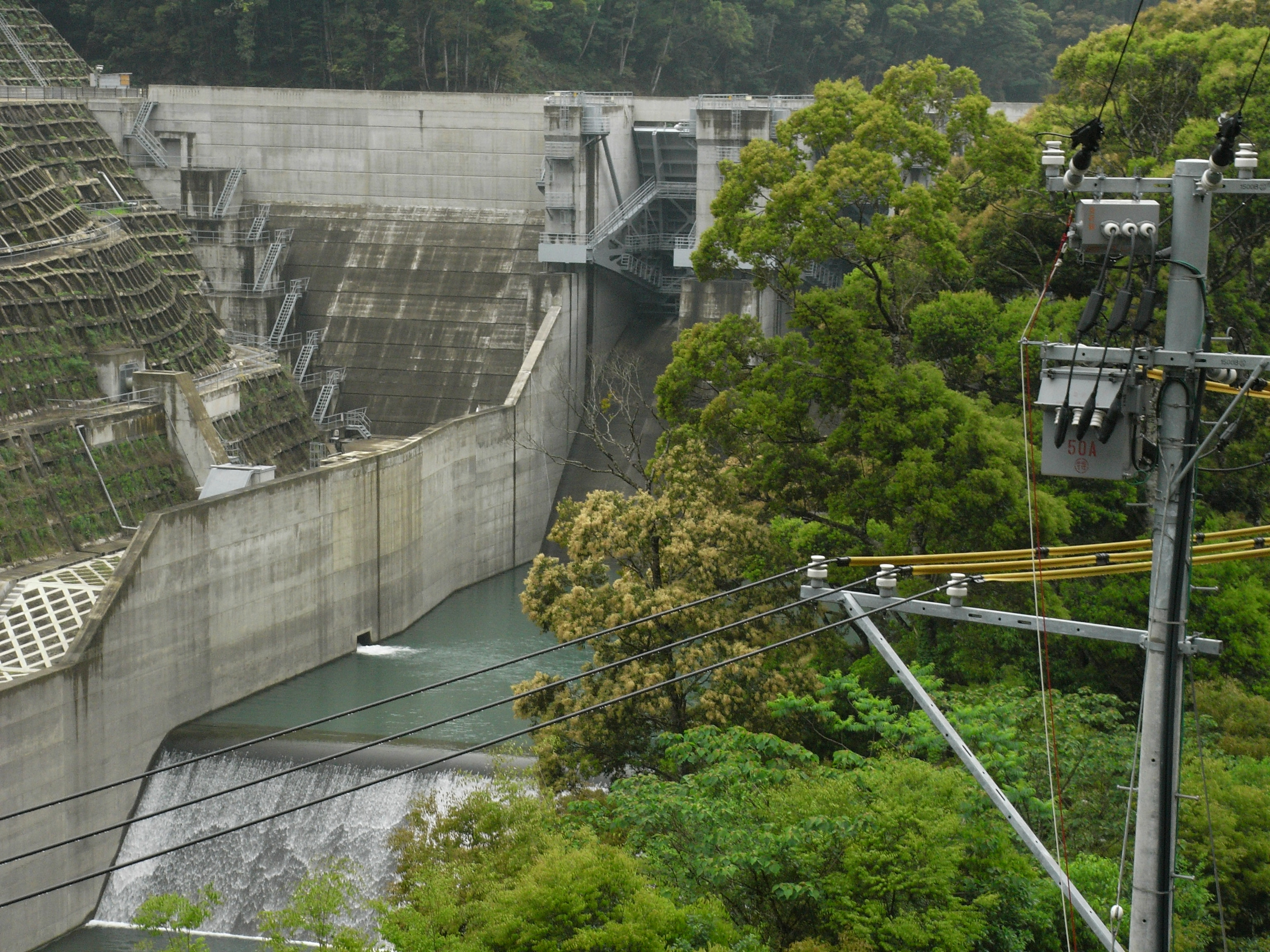
- Country: Japan
- Location: Kijo, Koyu District, Miyazaki Prefecture
- Status: Operational
- Construction began: 1997
- Opening date: 2007-2011
- Operator(s): Kyushu Electric Power Company

Upper reservoir
- Creates: Ishikawauchi upper reservoir
- Total capacity: 6,200,000 m^{3} (5,000 acre⋅ft)

Lower reservoir
- Creates: Ishikawauchi lower reservoir

Power Station
- Hydraulic head: 646 m (2,119 ft)
- Pump-generators: 4 x 300 MW reversible Francis turbines
- Installed capacity: 1,200 MW (1,600,000 hp)

The Omarugawa Pumped Storage Power Station (Japanese: 小丸川発電所, Hepburn: Omarugawa Hatsudensho) is a large pumped-storage hydroelectric power station in Kijo in the Koyu District of Miyazaki Prefecture, Japan. With a total installed capacity of 1,200 megawatts (1,600,000 hp), it is one of the largest pumped-storage power stations in Japan.

The facility is run by the Kyushu Electric Power Company. The power plant started operation in July 2007 and all four units were commissioned by July 2011. Like most pumped-storage facilities, the power station uses two reservoirs, releasing and pumping as the demand rises and falls. Oseuchi Dam and Kanasumi Dam form the upper artificial reservoir, while Ishikawauchi Dam on the Omaru river (Omarugawa) forms the lower reservoir. Ishikawauchi Dam is a 47.5 m concrete gravity dam, while Oseuchi and Kanasumi dams are rock-fill dams, 65.5 m and 42.5 m high, respectively. The natural influx on water on the upper reservoir is limited, therefore the plant can be considered almost pure pumped-storage. The entire upper pond was made waterproof with asphalt to avoid leakage in the surrounding permeable soil.

The two reservoirs are connected through underground penstocks. The power plant is located underground in the middle. The power station employs 4 pump-generators. Unit 1 and 4 were manufactured by Hitachi, while units 2 and 3 are from Mitsubishi. The maximum amount of water used by the plant is 222 cubic meters per second, for an effective storage capacity of 7 hours. All units are adjustable speed systems, allowing for a rapid variation of power levels during both pumping and generation.

A visitor center, Pino' Q Park, was opened by Kyushu Electric Power in July 2008. The center features miniature models of the power plant, videos and other media to explain the operation of the pumped-storage plant.

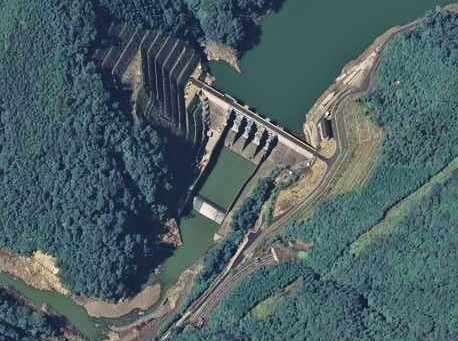
Ishikawauchi Dam

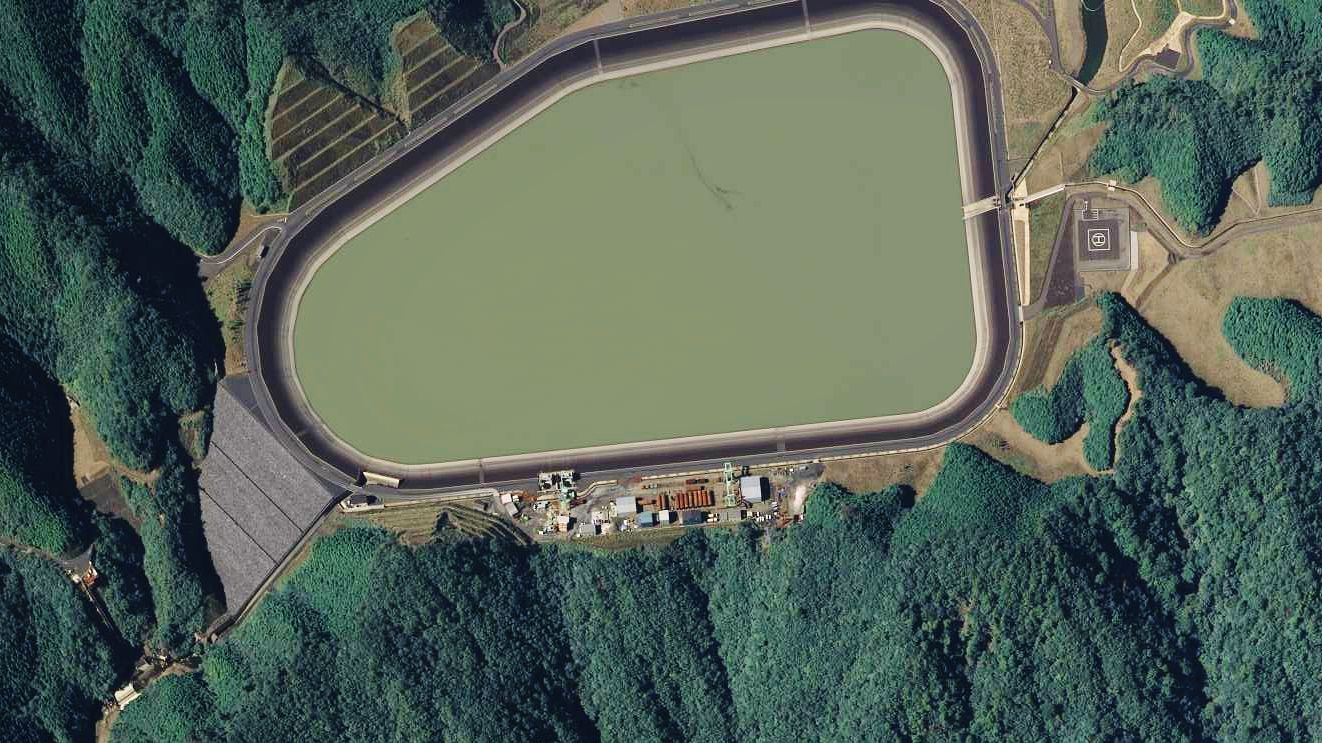
The upper reservoir

== See also ==
- List of power stations in Japan
- Hydroelectricity in Japan
- List of pumped-storage hydroelectric power stations
