= Setouchi Kirei Mega Solar Power Plant =

Solar power station in Okayama, Japan

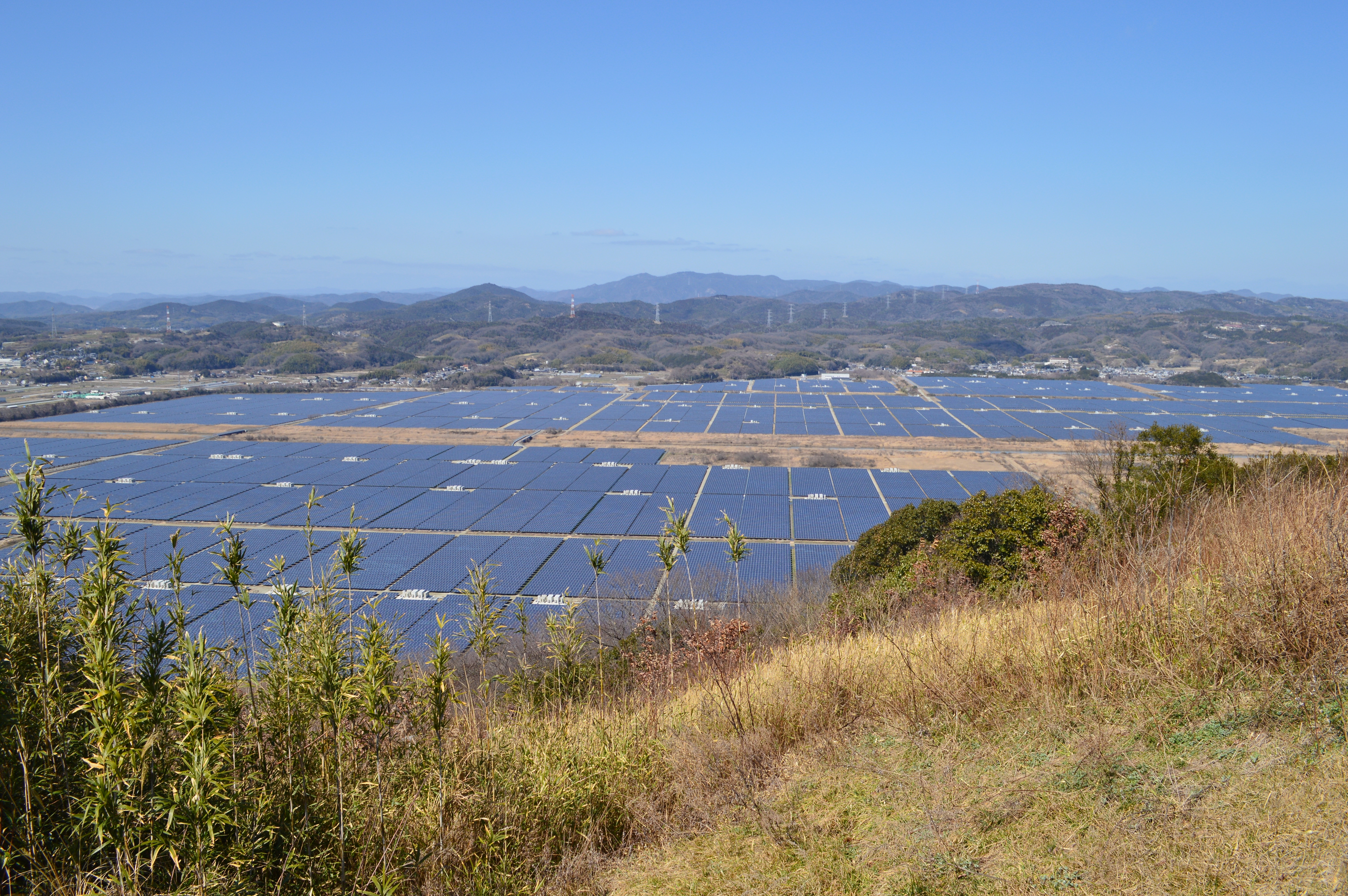
Setouchi Kirei Mega Solar Power Plant

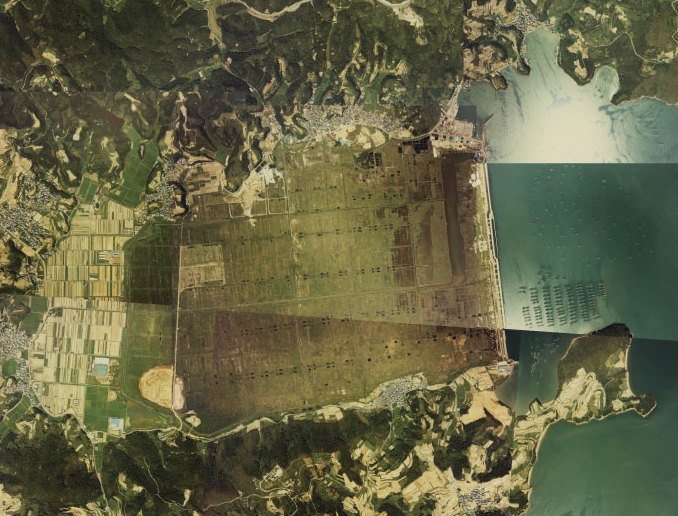
A 1981 aerial view of the power plant site, formerly used for salt production

Setouchi Kirei Mega Solar Power Plant (Japanese: 瀬戸内Kirei太陽光発電所, romanized: Setouchi Kirei Tayō Kōhatsuden-jo), located in Setouchi, Okayama, is the largest solar power station in Japan. It has a generating capacity of 235 MW.

== History ==
The plant occupies a large reclaimed site in Kinkai Bay that used to be used for the production of salt.

Construction of the plant began in November 2014. It began commercial operation on 1 October 2018. A completion ceremony was held on 9 November 2018.

== Details ==
The facility comprises about 900,000 solar panels occupying approximately 260 hectares. Electricity produced there is sold to Chugoku Electric Power Company.

== See also ==
- List of power stations in Japan
- Solar power in Japan
