= Namie-Odaka Nuclear Power Plant =

Unfinished nuclear power plant located in Fukushima Prefecture, Japan

- Country: Japan
- Coordinates: 37°30′48.2″N 141°02′03.1″E
- Status: Cancelled
- Owner: Tōhoku Electric Power Company

Nuclear power station
- Reactor type: ABWR

Power generation
- Units cancelled: 1 x 825 MW
- Nameplate capacity: 825 MW

External links
- Website: www.tohoku-epco.co.jp/genshi/hatudn/index.html

The Namie-Odaka Nuclear Power Plant (浪江・小高原子力発電所, Namie Odaka genshiryoku hatsudensho) was a planned nuclear power plant in Minamisōma and Namie in the Fukushima Prefecture, Japan. It was a project of the Tōhoku Electric Power Company. Preliminary ground work had been completed by the time of the 2011 Tōhoku earthquake and tsunami. The plans were canceled after urging from local lawmakers in the wake of the Fukushima Daiichi nuclear disaster and due to strong local opposition. On January 31, 2017, Tohoku Electric decided to donate the site of about 1.2 million square meters to Namie Town free of charge.

== Reactors on site ==
=== Unit 1 (not built) ===
- Type: ABWR
- Start of construction: 2017
- Begin of operation: 2021 (planned)
- Electric Output: 825 MW
- Fuel: UO_{2} fuel
