= JERA =

Thermal power company in Japan

株式会社 JERA
- Company type: Joint venture
- Industry: Electric utility
- Founded: Tokyo, Japan (April 30, 2015)
- Headquarters: Chuo, Tokyo, Tokyo, Japan
- Services: Electric generation, transmission, and distribution
- Total equity: ¥5 billion (2015)
- Owner: Tokyo Electric (50%); Chubu Electric (50%)
- Website: www.jera.co.jp

JERA (Japanese: 株式会社JERA, romanized: Kabushikigaisha JERA) is a 50-50 joint venture between TEPCO Fuel & Power, a wholly owned subsidiary of Tokyo Electric Power Company, and Chubu Electric Power, founded in April 2015. The company assumed ownership and operation of all of Tokyo Electric and Chubu Electric thermal power stations, giving it a total output of approximately 67 GW (including capacity under construction), which made it Japan's largest power generation company. The electricity generated is wholesaled to retail electric utilities such as TEPCO Energy Partner and Chubu Electric Power, and is not supplied directly to consumers. Fossil fuels comprised 97% of JERA’s global installed power generation capacity and nearly all domestic operations, while renewables represented 3% globally and 0.2% in Japan as of FY2023.

== Background ==
The concept of JERA was floated immediately after the Fukushima Daiichi nuclear disaster by a group of young managers within Tokyo Electric, who sought to separate the thermal power generation portion of the company from the nuclear sector (together with the legal and fiscal responsibility for the accident) to ensure Tokyo Electric's survival. The idea was vehemently opposed by Tokyo Electric's chairman; however, by 2012 Tokyo Electric was facing imminent bankruptcy over damage compensation claim and the costs of decommissioning the Fukushima nuclear plants, as well as high costs for fossil fuel to make up the power generation shortfall from its 17 idled nuclear reactors. In addition, many of its thermal power plants were obsolete, and with Tokyo Electric's plummeting credit rating, it was deemed unlikely and the necessary funding could be secured for revamping or construction.

From March 2014, Tokyo Electric began to solicit partners for a strategic alliance. Meanwhile, Nagoya-based Chubu Electric was eager to expand into the Kanto region and had been receiving many enquiries from Kanto-based users unhappy with Tokyo Electric's increasing rates. However, efforts to enter the Kanto region and to compete against Tokyo Electric were hampered by the Japanese government's unwritten regulations creating regional electric generation monopolies. Chubu Electric initially attempted to circumvent these regulations by building a new 650 MW coal-fired power generation facility on the premises of TEPCO's Hitachi Naka Thermal Power Station, with power generated by this plant to be sold by Tokyo Electric on its behalf. This led to further discussions in September 2014 for a comprehensive alliance on thermal power generation, and JERA was launched in April 2015.

In November 2024, JERA announced its plan to restart coal and biomass co-firing at its Taketoyo thermal power station in central Japan around the beginning of April 2026. Jera will conduct coal-only operations during winter and summer starting around January 2025 to ensure a stable electric supply.
