= List of dams in Gifu Prefecture =

The following is a list of dams in Gifu Prefecture, Japan.

== List ==
Name	Location	Opened	Height (metres)	Image
Agigawa Dam		1990	101.5	
Akigami Dam		1953	74	
Araizawa Tameike Dam		1952	17	
Asahi Dam		1953	87	
Asaida Dam		1942	21.1	
Atagi Dam		1987	71.4	
Fukaya Dam		1973	27.3	
Fuwa-hokubu Bosai Dam		1985	42.5	
Hachiya Dam		1978	30	
Hakusui Dam		1963	18	
Hananoko Tameike Dam		1959	20.7	
Hananoko Tameike Fukutei Dam		1959	15	
Hatogaya Dam		1956	63.2	
Hichiso Dam				
Higashiueda Dam		1954	18	
Hirao No.1 Tameike Dam		1916	19.9	
Hirao No.2 Tameike Dam		1916	25	
Hiyoshi Bosai Dam		1976	21	
Hosobidani Dam		1926	22.4	
Iino Tameike Dam		1959	23	
Ijira Tameike Dam		1966	18	
Imawatari Dam		1939	34.3	
Iwamura Dam		1997	35.8	
Iwaya Dam		1976	127.5	
Januke Tameike Dam		1949	18.2	
Jintoku Bosai Dam		1957	24	
Jorinji Bosai Dam		1964	23	
Kamiasō Dam		1926	13.2	
Kamigatake Dam		1935	20	
Kamiiida Choseichi Dam		1975	16.1	
Kamiosu Dam		1995	98	
Kanedaira Bosai Dam		1987	38.5	
Kaneyama Dam		1943	36.3	
Kaore Dam		1995	107.5	
Kaoreanbu Dam		1995	40	
Kasagi Dam		1936	40.8	
Kashimo Bosai Dam		1975	35.6	
Kawabe Dam			27	
Kobuchi Dam		1951	18.4	
Kuguno Bosai Dam		1974	28	
Kuguno Dam			26.7	
Kuze Dam			34	
Maesawa Dam		1980	38	
Manada Tameike Dam		1953	17	
Maruyama Dam		1955	98.2	
Matsuno Dam		1961	26.7	
Mazegawa Dam		1976	44.5	
Miboro Dam		1961	131	
Minoriga-ike Dam		1915	15	
Miyagawa Bosai Dam		1971	29	
Mukunomi Bosai Dam		1968	26.9	
Nagura Dam				
Nakanoho Dam		2005	41.7	
Narude Dam		Nov 1951	53.2	
Nenoue-ko Dam		1964	15	
Nishidaira Dam			31.5	
Nishimura Dam			19.5	
Nyukawa Dam		2012	69.5	
Ochiai Dam		1926	33.3	
Ofunato Dam				
Ohbora Bosai Dam		1952	16.8	
Ogahora Dam		1998	42.5	
Okurodani Dam		1971	34	
Oshirakawa Dam		1963	95	
Ohtani-ike Dam		1914	18.7	
Ōi Dam		1924	53.4	
Origawa Dam		2003	114	
Oshirakawa Dam		1963	95	
Ozawa Tameike Dam		1965	32	
Sakagami Dam		1953	23.5	
Sakaigawa Dam		1993	115	
Sakashimagawa Bosai Dam		1963	19.7	
Shimohara Dam		1938	23	
Shimokotori Dam			119	
Shin Tameike Dam		1918	15	
Shin'inotani Dam		1963	56	
Shinmaruyama Dam			118.4	
Sugoroku Dam		1953	19	
Takahashi Dam		1919	18.5	
Takane No.1 Dam		1969	133	
Takane No.2 Dam		1968	69	
Takeori Bosai Dam		1958	17.2	
Taniyama Tameike Dam		1953	18	
Tazawa Bosai Dam		1993	29.5	
Tokuyama Dam		2008	161	
Tsubawara Dam		Jan 1954	68.2	
Tsunokawa Dam		1955	21.5	
Ubagahora Tameike Dam		1964	20	
Uchigatani Dam		2023	84.2	
Ushiroyama Tameike Dam		1951	19.9	
Utsubo Dam		1953	25.5	
Yahagi Dam		1970	100	
Yamada Bosai Dam		1988	32.3	
Yokoyama Dam		1964	80.8	

== See also ==
- Media related to Dams in Gifu prefecture at Wikimedia Commons
