= Takane =

Takane may refer to:

== Places ==
- Takane, Yamanashi, a town in Yamanashi Prefecture, Japan
- Takane, Gifu, a town in Gifu, Japan
- Takane Dam and Takane No.2 Dam, dams in Gifu Prefecture, Japan

== People ==
- Fubuki Takane (born 1965), Japanese actress
- Martha Takane, Mexican mathematician
- Takane Lui, Japanese VTuber
- Yūga Takane, Japanese voice actor and singer

== Characters ==
- Hibiki Takane, fictional character in video game The Last Blade 2
- Himura Takane, a character in the anime series Shinobi no Ittoki
- Ryuuji Takane, a character in the manga series Ring ni Kakero
- Tsubomi Takane, a character in the anime and manga series Mob Psycho 100
- Takane D. Goodman, a character in the manga and anime series Negima! Magister Negi Magi
- Takane Enomoto, a character in the mixed-media series Kagerou Project
- Takane Hoshikawa, a character in the television drama series 5→9 From Five to Nine
- Takane Ikushima, a character in the yaoi novel series Fujimi Orchestra
- Takane Katsu, a character in the anime series Burst Angel
- Takane Serikawa, a character in the manga series Ani ni Aisaresugite Komattemasu
- Takane Shijō, a character in the game series The Idolmaster
- Takane Shimuzu, a character in the survival drama film K2
- Takane Yamashiro, character from Unconnected Marketeers in the Touhou Project series

== Media ==
- Takane and Hana, Japanese shōjo manga series
- Takane no Hana, Japanese manga series
- Takane no Ringo, single by NMB48

== Other ==
- 9041 Takane, asteroid, named after the town in Yamanashi
