= Iwamura Dam =

Iwamura Dam may refer to:

- Iwamura Dam (Hokkaido)
- Iwamura Dam (Gifu)
