= Tokuyama Dam =

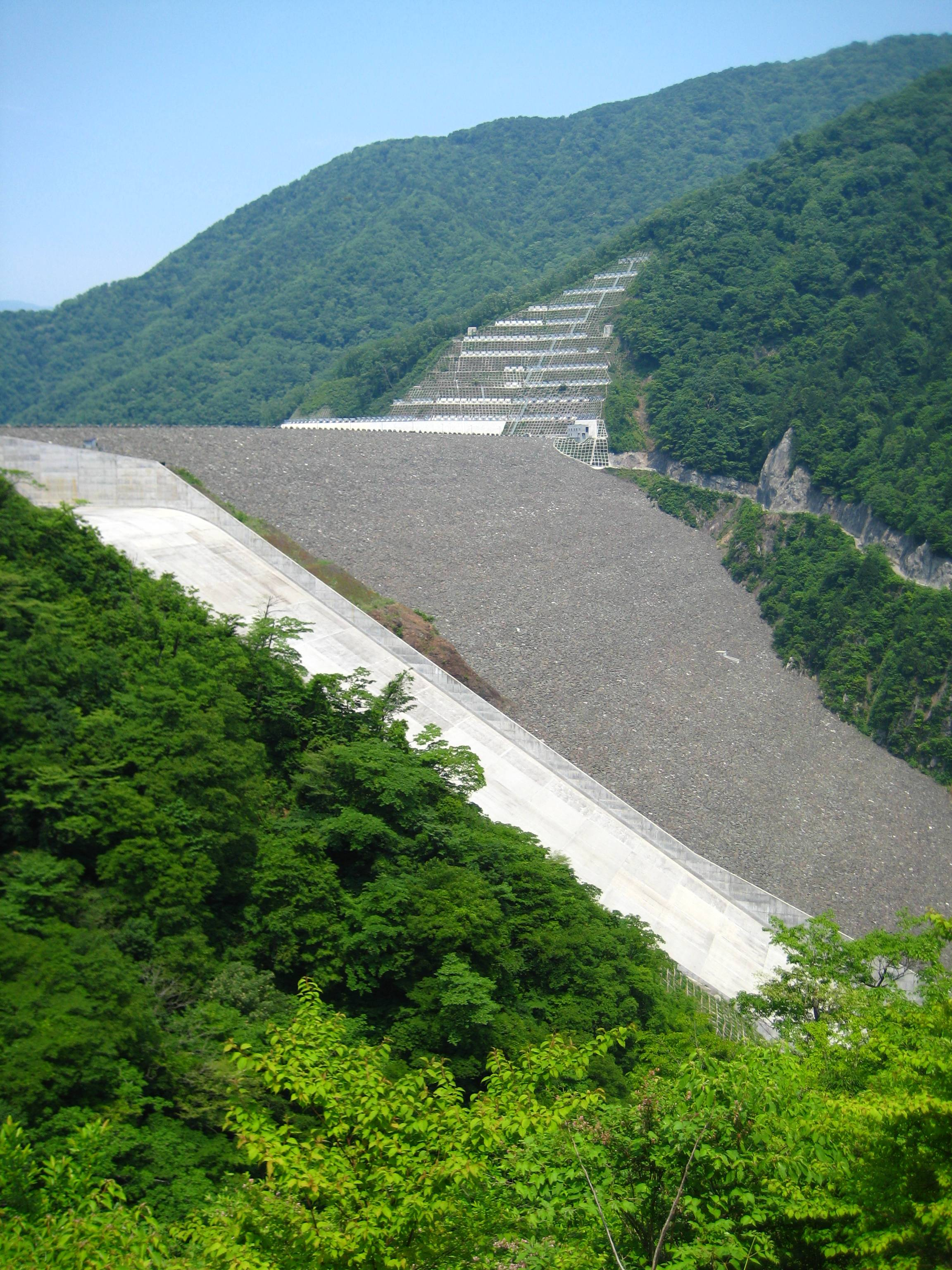
- Tokuyama Dam

- Location within Japan
- Location: Ibigawa, Ibi District, Gifu Prefecture, Japan
- Coordinates: 35°39′55″N 136°30′08″E
- Construction began: 2000
- Opening date: 2008
- Construction cost: $360 million USD
- Owner: Japan Water Agency

Dam and spillways
- Type of dam: Embankment, rock-fill
- Impounds: Ibi River
- Height: 161 m (528 ft)
- Length: 427.1 m (1,401 ft)
- Dam volume: 13,700,000 m^{3} (480,000,000 ft^{3})
- Spillway type: Service, gate-controlled

Reservoir
- Creates: Tokuyama Reservoir
- Total capacity: 660,000,000 m^{3} (540,000 acre⋅ft)
- Catchment area: 254.5 km^{2} (98.3 sq mi)
- Surface area: 13 km^{2} (5.0 sq mi)

Power Station
- Coordinates: 35°38′3.18″N 136°28′35.10″E
- Operator: Chubu Electric
- Commission date: 2014-2015
- Type: Conventional
- Turbines: 1 x 23 MW, 1 x 130 MW Francis-type
- Installed capacity: 153 MW

The Tokuyama Dam (徳山ダム, Tokuyama damu) is an embankment dam near Ibigawa, Ibi District, Gifu Prefecture in Japan. The dam was completed in 2008 and will support a 153 MW hydroelectric power station that is expected to be fully operational in 2015. Unit 1 at 23 MW was commissioned in May 2014. The dam was originally intended to withhold the upper reservoir of a 400 MW pumped-storage power station until a design change in 2004. The dam is also intended for flood control and water supply. It is the largest dam by structural volume in Japan and withholds the country's largest reservoir by volume as well.

== History ==
In December 1957, Electric Power Development Company (J-Power) selected the Ibi River for study at the 23rd Electric Power Development Coordinating Meeting. By May 1976, the Ministry of Construction released their bulletin "Policy on Tokuyama Dam Construction Project". In December 1982, the project was incorporated into the Electric Power Development Basic Plan. It was approved by the government in 1998. The original project was a pumped-storage hydroelectric scheme which consisted of the Tokuyama Dam as the upper reservoir, the Sugihara Dam as the lower and the 400 MW Sugihara Power Plant.

The dam is named after the village that was flooded by the construction of the dam.

Construction on the dam started in May 2000 but by May 2004 J-Power and Chubu Electric announced they had changed the design of the project due to the concerns and protests of locals and groups. Instead of the pumped-storage hydroelectric scheme, only the Tokuyama Dam was to be constructed with a 153-MW conventional power station. Subsequently, the Sugihara Dam and Sugihara Power Plant were scrapped from the project. During construction, the 503 m (1,650 ft) long Tokunoyama Hattoku Bridge was constructed upstream. With improved techniques and equipment, fill for the dam was laid at a pace of 6,200,000 m^{3} (220,000,000 ft^{3}) per year, enabling the dam to be constructed in 26 months. Sediment from the Yokoyama Dam's reservoir was used as fill as well. In September 2006 initial filling of the reservoir behind the Tokuyama Dam began and by June 2008, the dam was complete. Filling was complete in September. In October of the same year, J-Power passed oversight of the power station construction to Chubu. The first generator, Unit 1, was commissioned on 15 May 2014. Unit 2 should be commissioned by June 2015.

== Design ==
The Tokuyama Dam is a 427.1 m (1,401 ft) long and 161 m (528 ft) high rock-fill embankment dam with a clay core. The total structural volume of the dam is 13,700,000 m^{3} (480,000,000 ft^{3}). The dam creates a reservoir with a 660,000,000 m^{3} (2.3×10^{10} ft^{3}) capacity, surface area of 13 km^{2} (5.0 sq mi) and catchment area of 254.5 km^{2} (98.3 sq mi). The dam will support two Francis turbine-generators, one with a 130 MW capacity which will be located in an underground power station downstream. The second is an operational 23 MW generator and is located at the base of the dam. The installed capacity of both will be 153 MW. The power station will process a maximum of 100 m^{3}/s (3,500 cu ft/s) for power production.
