= Iwamura Dam (Gifu) =

Dam in Gifu Prefecture, Japan

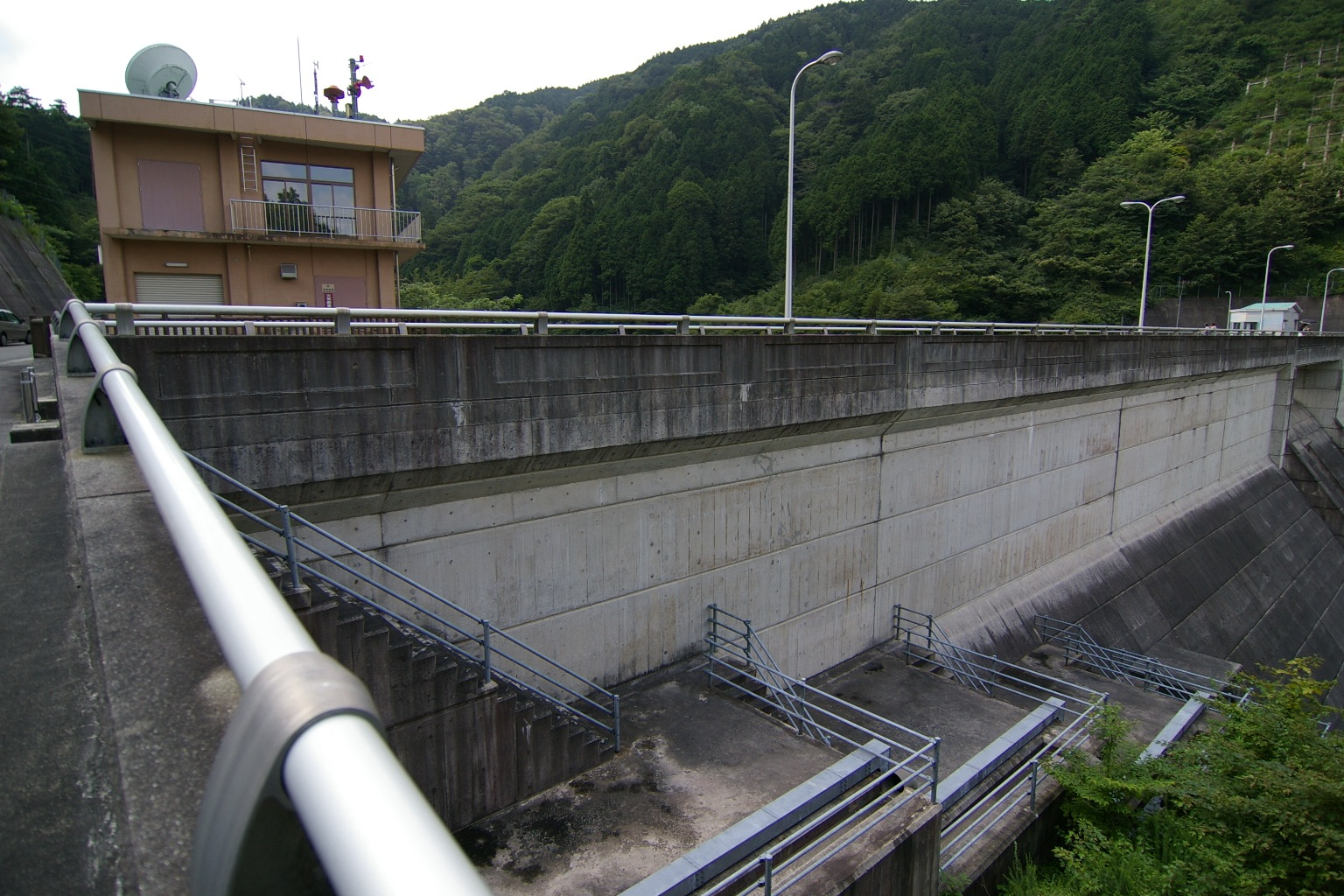

- Location within Japan
- Interactive map of Iwamura Dam
- Location: Gifu Prefecture, Japan
- Coordinates: 35°21′46″N 137°28′27″E
- Construction began: 1986
- Opening date: 1997

Dam and spillways
- Height: 35.8 m (117 ft)
- Length: 144 m (472 ft)

Reservoir
- Total capacity: 180 thousand cubic meters
- Catchment area: 1.7 sq. km
- Surface area: 2 hectares

Iwamura Dam is a gravity dam located in Gifu Prefecture in Japan. The dam is used for flood control and water supply. The catchment area of the dam is 1.7 km^{2}. The dam impounds about 2 ha of land when full and can store 180 thousand cubic meters of water. The construction of the dam was started on 1986 and completed in 1997.
