= Shinmaruyama Dam =

Dam in Gifu Prefecture, Japan

- Location within Japan
- Location: Gifu Prefecture, Japan
- Coordinates: 35°28′07″N 137°10′19″E
- Construction began: 1980

Dam and spillways
- Height: 118.4 m (388 ft)
- Length: 340.6 m (1,117 ft)

Reservoir
- Total capacity: 131,350,000 m^{3} (4.639×10^{9} cu ft)
- Catchment area: 2,409 km^{2} (930 sq mi)
- Surface area: 368 hectares (910 acres)

Shinmaruyama Dam is a gravity dam located in Gifu Prefecture in Japan. The dam is used for flood control and power production. The catchment area of the dam is 2409 km^{2}. The dam impounds about 368 ha of land when full and can store 131350 thousand cubic meters of water. The construction of the dam was started on 1980.
