= Januke Tameike Dam =

Dam in Gifu Prefecture, Japan

Januke Tameike
- Location within Japan
- Interactive map of Januke Tameike
- Location: Gifu Prefecture, Japan
- Coordinates: 35°23′10″N 137°18′06″E
- Opening date: 1949

Dam and spillways
- Height: 18.2 m (60 ft)
- Length: 44 m (144 ft)

Reservoir
- Total capacity: 80 thousand cubic meters
- Catchment area: sq. km
- Surface area: 2 hectares

Januke Tameike is a gravity dam located in Gifu Prefecture in Japan. The dam is used for irrigation. The catchment area of the dam is km^{2}. The dam impounds about 2 ha of land when full and can store 80 thousand cubic meters of water. The construction of the dam was completed in 1949.
