= Shin'inotani Dam =

Dam in Gifu Prefecture, Japan

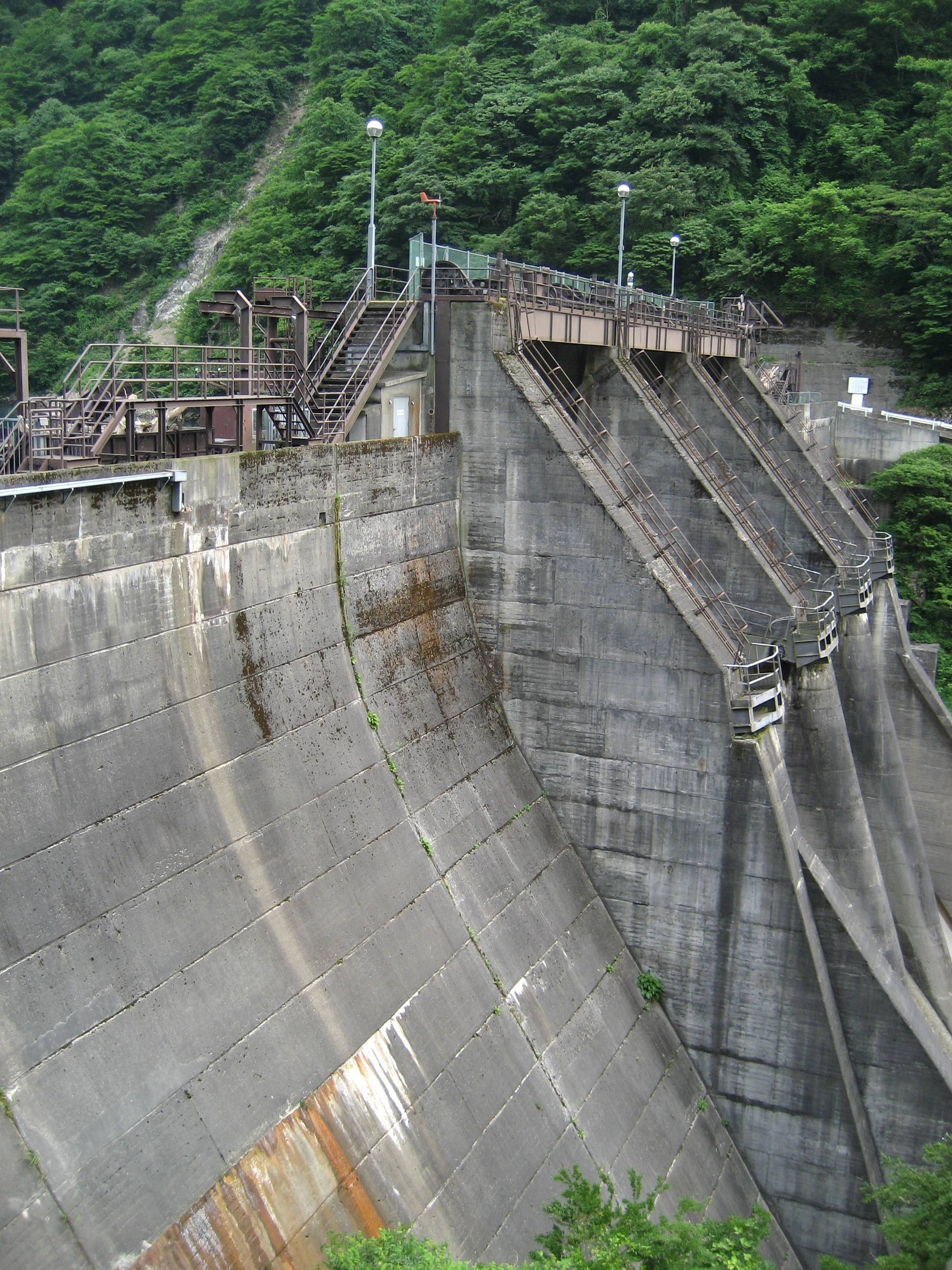
- Interactive map of Shin'inotani Dam
- Official name: 新猪谷ダム
- Location: Hida, Gifu, Japan.
- Coordinates: 36°25′43″N 137°16′46″E
- Construction began: 1961
- Opening date: 1963

Dam and spillways
- Impounds: Takahara River
- Height: 56 meters
- Length: 154 meters

Reservoir
- Total capacity: 1,608,000 m^{3}
- Catchment area: 762 km^{2}
- Surface area: 28.0 ha

Power Station
- Installed capacity: 56.9 MW

The Shin'inotani Dam (新猪谷ダム, Shin'inotani Damu) is a dam in the city of Hida, Gifu Prefecture, Japan located on the Takahara River, part of the Jinzū River system. The dam is a concrete gravity dam with a height of 56 meters, and is operated by the Hokuriku Electric Power Company. The reservoir created is used by hydroelectric power generation for a total of 56,900 kW. The dam was completed in 1963.
