= Nagura Dam =

Dam in Gifu Prefecture, Japan

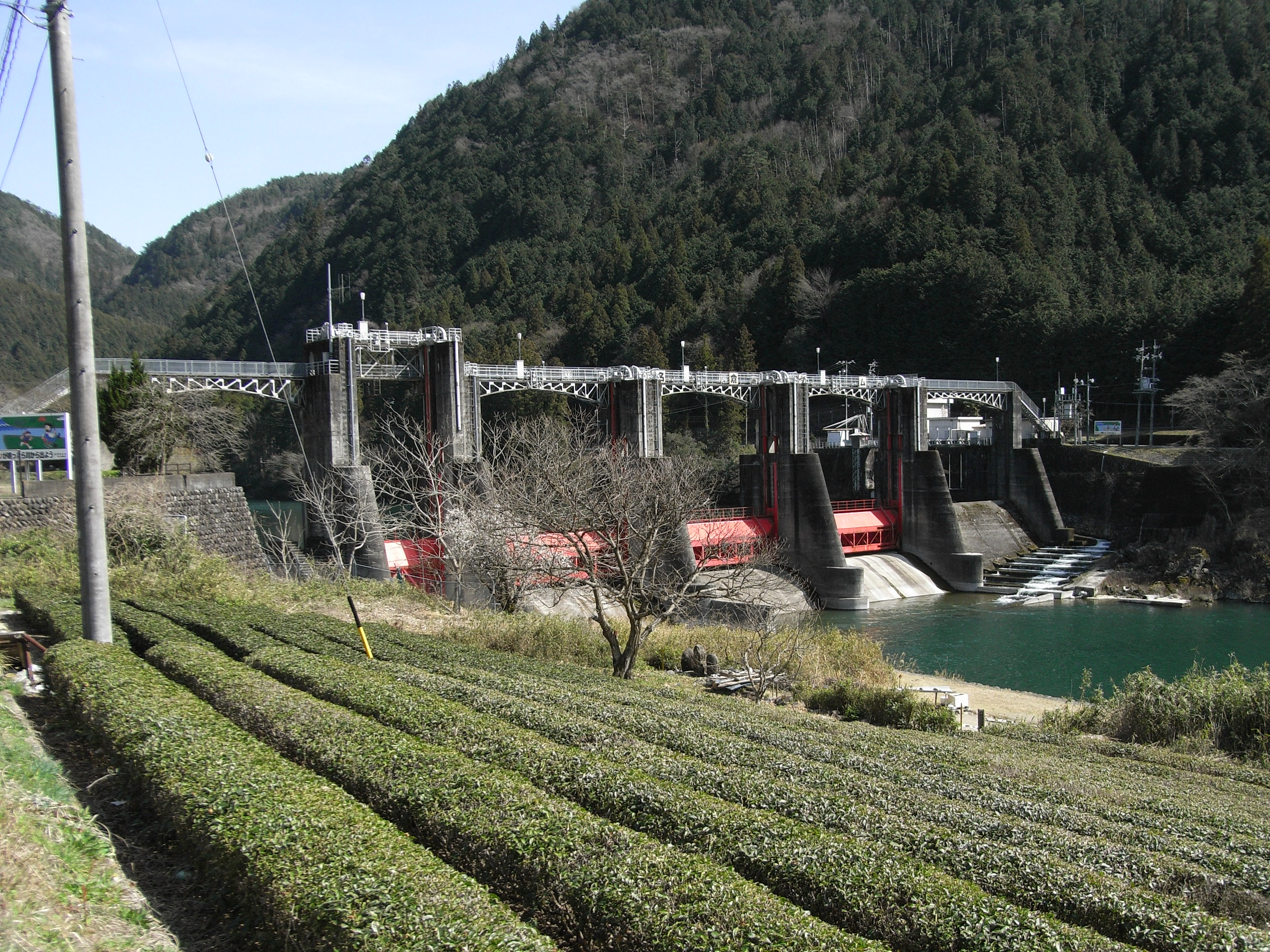
- Interactive map of Nagura Dam
- Location: Gifu Prefecture, Japan.

Dam and spillways
- Impounds: Hida River

Nagura Dam (名倉ダム, Nagura damu) is a dam in the Gifu Prefecture of Japan.
