= Jorinji Bosai Dam =

Dam in Gifu Prefecture, Japan

- Location within Japan
- Interactive map of Jorinji Bosai Dam
- Location: Gifu Prefecture, Japan
- Coordinates: 35°23′02″N 137°11′51″E
- Opening date: 1964

Dam and spillways
- Height: 23 m (75 ft)
- Length: 84.3 m (277 ft)

Reservoir
- Total capacity: 295 thousand cubic meters
- Catchment area: 2 sq. km
- Surface area: 5 hectares

Jorinji Bosai Dam is an earthfill dam located in Gifu Prefecture in Japan. The dam is used for flood control. The catchment area of the dam is 2 km^{2}. The dam impounds about 5 ha of land when full and can store 295 thousand cubic meters of water. The construction of the dam was completed in 1964.
