= Ubagahora Tameike Dam =

Dam in Gifu Prefecture, Japan

- Location within Japan
- Location: Gifu Prefecture, Japan
- Coordinates: 35°22′02″N 137°27′18″E
- Opening date: 1964

Dam and spillways
- Height: 20 m (66 ft)
- Length: 141 m (463 ft)

Reservoir
- Total capacity: 187,000 m^{3} (6,600,000 cu ft)
- Catchment area: 1.8 km^{2} (0.69 sq mi)
- Surface area: 3 hectares (7.4 acres)

Ubagahora Tameike Dam is an earthfill dam located in Gifu Prefecture in Japan. The dam is used for irrigation. The catchment area of the dam is 1.8 km^{2}. The dam impounds about 3 ha of land when full and can store 187 thousand cubic meters of water. The construction of the dam was completed in 1964.
