= Hirao No.2 Tameike Dam =

Dam in Gifu Prefecture, Japan

Hirao No.2 Tameike
- Location within Japan
- Interactive map of Hirao No.2 Tameike
- Location: Gifu Prefecture, Japan
- Coordinates: 35°23′39″N 136°32′26″E
- Opening date: 1916

Dam and spillways
- Height: 25 m (82 ft)
- Length: 107.9 m (354 ft)

Reservoir
- Total capacity: 359 thousand cubic meters
- Catchment area: 0.1 sq. km
- Surface area: 3 hectares

Hirao No.2 Tameike is an earthfill dam located in Gifu Prefecture in Japan. The dam is used for irrigation. The catchment area of the dam is 0.1 km^{2}. The dam impounds about 3 ha of land when full and can store 359 thousand cubic meters of water. The construction of the dam was completed in 1916.
