= Hakusui Dam (Gifu) =

Dam in Gifu Prefecture, Japan

- Location within Japan
- Interactive map of Hakusui Dam
- Location: Gifu Prefecture, Japan
- Coordinates: 36°8′39″N 136°49′21″E
- Opening date: 1963

Dam and spillways
- Height: 18 m (59 ft)
- Length: 81.1 m (266 ft)

Reservoir
- Total capacity: 29290 thousand cubic meters
- Catchment area: 11.5 sq. km
- Surface area: 1 hectares

Hakusui Dam is a gravity concrete and fill dam (compound dam) located in Gifu Prefecture in Japan. The dam is used for power production. The catchment area of the dam is 11.5 km^{2}. The dam impounds about 1 ha of land when full and can store 29290 thousand cubic meters of water. The construction of the dam was completed in 1963.
