= Shin Tameike Dam =

Dam in Gifu Prefecture, Japan

- Location within Japan
- Location: Gifu Prefecture, Japan
- Coordinates: 35°29′39″N 137°27′47″E
- Opening date: 1918

Dam and spillways
- Height: 15 m (49 ft)
- Length: 96 m (315 ft)

Reservoir
- Total capacity: 400,000 m^{3} (14,000,000 cu ft)
- Catchment area: 1.3 km^{2} (0.50 sq mi)
- Surface area: 6 hectares (15 acres)

Shin Tameike Dam is an earthfill dam located in Gifu Prefecture in Japan. The dam is used for irrigation. The catchment area of the dam is 1.3 km^{2}. The dam impounds about 6 ha of land when full and can store 400 thousand cubic meters of water. The construction of the dam was completed in 1918.
