= Uchigatani Dam =

Dam in Gifu Prefecture, Japan

- Location within Japan
- Location: Gifu Prefecture, Japan
- Coordinates: 35°46′46″N 136°51′44″E
- Construction began: 1979
- Opening date: 2023

Dam and spillways
- Height: 84.2 m (276 ft)
- Length: 261.5 m (858 ft)

Reservoir
- Total capacity: 11,500,000 m^{3} (410,000,000 cu ft)
- Catchment area: 39.9 km^{2} (15.4 sq mi)
- Surface area: 46 hectares (110 acres)

Uchigatani Dam is a gravity dam located in Gifu Prefecture in Japan. The dam is used for flood control. The catchment area of the dam is 39.9 km^{2}. The dam impounds about 46 ha of land when full and can store 11500 thousand cubic meters of water. The construction of the dam was started on 1979 and completed in 2023.
