= Asaida Dam =

Dam in Gifu Prefecture, Japan

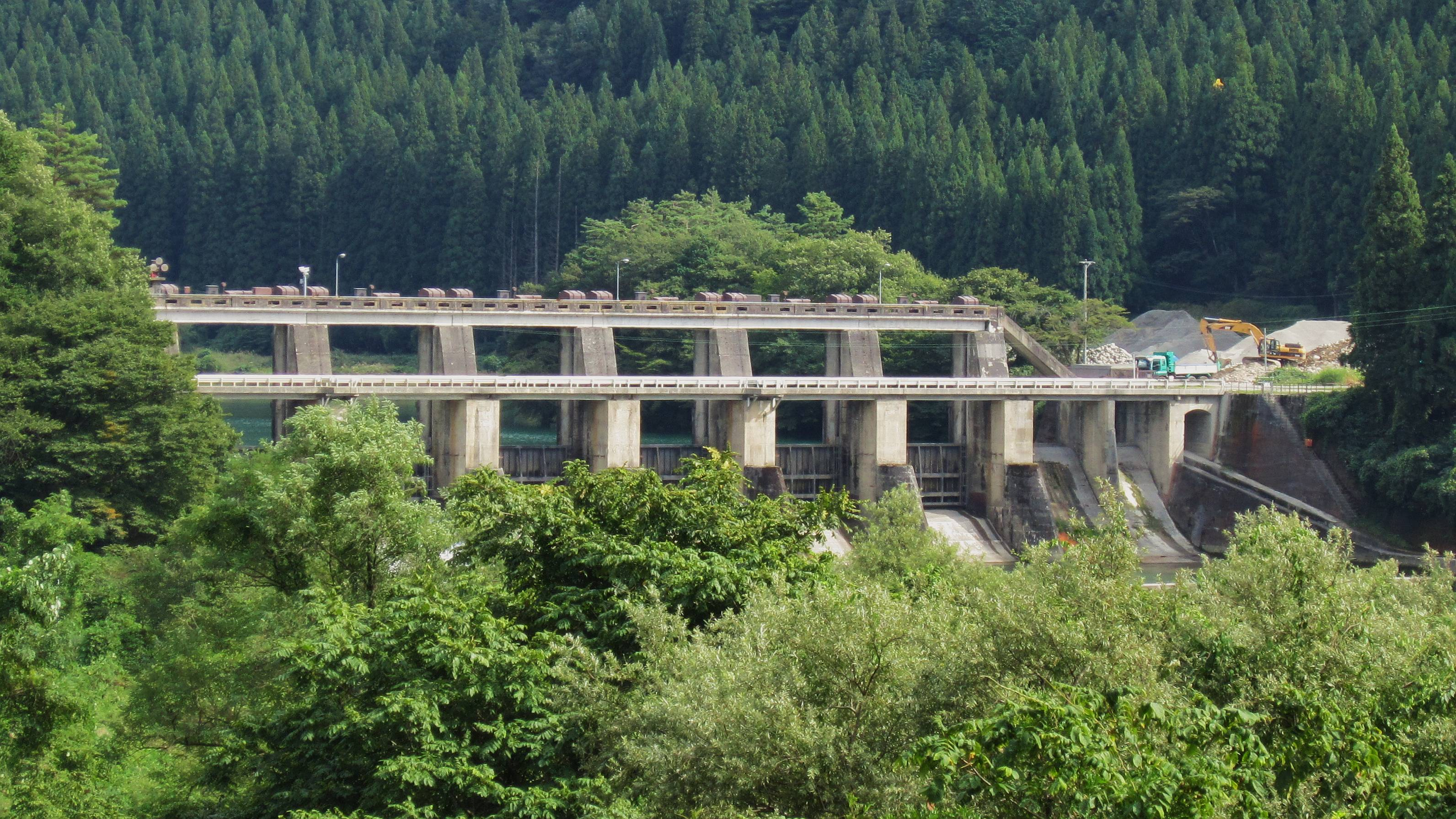

- Location within Japan
- Interactive map of Asaida Dam
- Location: Gifu Prefecture, Japan
- Coordinates: 36°17′50″N 137°21′07″E
- Construction began: 1939
- Opening date: 1942

Dam and spillways
- Height: 21.1 m (69 ft)
- Length: 135.4 m (444 ft)

Reservoir
- Total capacity: 340 thousand cubic meters
- Catchment area: 507 sq. km
- Surface area: 10 hectares

Asaida Dam (浅井田ダム) is a gravity dam located in Gifu Prefecture in Japan. The dam is used for power production. The catchment area of the dam is 507 km^{2}. The dam impounds about 10 ha of land when full and can store 340 thousand cubic meters of water. The construction of the dam was started on 1939 and completed in 1942.
