= Kamigatake Dam =

Dam in Gifu Prefecture, Japan

- Location within Japan
- Location: Gifu Prefecture, Japan
- Coordinates: 35°38′46″N 136°20′54″E
- Construction began: 1934
- Opening date: 1935

Dam and spillways
- Height: 20 m (66 ft)
- Length: 52 m (171 ft)

Reservoir
- Total capacity: 215 thousand cubic meters
- Catchment area: 34 sq. km
- Surface area: 5 hectares

Kamigatake Dam is a gravity dam located in Gifu Prefecture in Japan. The dam is used for power production. The catchment area of the dam is 34 km^{2}. The dam impounds about five ha of land when full and can store 215 thousand cubic meters of water. The construction of the dam was started on 1934 and completed in 1935.
