= Iino Tameike Dam =

Dam in Gifu Prefecture, Japan

- Location within Japan
- Interactive map of Iino Tameike Dam
- Location: Gifu Prefecture, Japan
- Coordinates: 35°24′41″N 137°28′26″E
- Opening date: 1959

Dam and spillways
- Height: 23 m (75 ft)
- Length: 84.7 m (278 ft)

Reservoir
- Total capacity: 120 thousand cubic meters
- Catchment area: 7.3 sq. km
- Surface area: 2 hectares

Iino Tameike Dam is an earthfill dam located in Gifu Prefecture in Japan. The dam is used for irrigation. The catchment area of the dam is 7.3 km^{2}. The dam impounds about 2 ha of land when full and can store 120 thousand cubic meters of water. The construction of the dam was completed in 1959.
