= Takeori Bosai Dam =

Dam in Gifu Prefecture, Japan

- Location within Japan
- Location: Gifu Prefecture, Japan
- Coordinates: 35°26′28″N 137°20′38″E
- Construction began: 1956
- Opening date: 1958

Dam and spillways
- Height: 17.2 m (56 ft)
- Length: 110 m (360 ft)

Reservoir
- Total capacity: 245,000 m^{3} (8,700,000 cu ft)
- Catchment area: 1.6 km^{2} (0.62 sq mi)
- Surface area: hectares

Takeori Bosai Dam is an earthfill dam located in Gifu Prefecture in Japan. The dam is used for flood control. The catchment area of the dam is 1.6 km^{2}. The dam impounds about ha of land when full and can store 245 thousand cubic meters of water. The construction of the dam was started on 1956 and completed in 1958.
