= Hirao No.1 Tameike Dam =

Dam in Gifu Prefecture, Japan

- Location within Japan
- Interactive map of Hirao No.1 Tameike Dam
- Location: Gifu Prefecture, Japan
- Coordinates: 35°23′46″N 136°32′26″E
- Opening date: 1916

Dam and spillways
- Height: 19.9 m (65 ft)
- Length: 65 m (213 ft)

Reservoir
- Total capacity: 160 thousand cubic meters
- Catchment area: 76 sq. km
- Surface area: 2 hectares

Hirao No.1 Tameike Dam is an earthfill dam located in Gifu Prefecture in Japan. The dam is used for irrigation. The catchment area of the dam is 76 km^{2}. The dam impounds about 2 ha of land when full and can store 160 thousand cubic meters of water. The construction of the dam was started on and completed in 1916.
