= Taniyama Tameike Dam =

Dam in Gifu Prefecture, Japan

- Location within Japan
- Location: Gifu Prefecture, Japan
- Coordinates: 35°26′12″N 137°7′59″E
- Construction began: 1950
- Opening date: 1953

Dam and spillways
- Height: 18 m (59 ft)
- Length: 62 m (203 ft)

Reservoir
- Total capacity: 268,000 m^{3} (9,500,000 cu ft)
- Catchment area: 2.2 km^{2} (0.85 sq mi)
- Surface area: 4 hectares (9.9 acres)

Taniyama Tameike Dam is a gravity dam located in Gifu Prefecture in Japan. The dam is used for flood control and irrigation. The catchment area of the dam is 2.2 km^{2}. The dam impounds about 4 ha of land when full and can store 268 thousand cubic meters of water. The construction of the dam was started on 1950 and completed in 1953.
