= Miyagawa Bosai Dam =

Dam in Gifu Prefecture, Japan

- Location within Japan
- Location: Gifu Prefecture, Japan
- Coordinates: 36°1′56″N 137°8′31″E
- Construction began: 1964
- Opening date: 1971

Dam and spillways
- Height: 29 m (95 ft)
- Length: 150.7 m (494 ft)

Reservoir
- Total capacity: 1628 thousand cubic meters
- Catchment area: 8.6 sq. km
- Surface area: 20 hectares

Miyagawa Bosai Dam is an earthfill dam located in Gifu Prefecture in Japan. The dam is used for flood control. The catchment area of the dam is 8.6 km^{2}. The dam impounds about 20 ha of land when full and can store 1628 thousand cubic meters of water. The construction of the dam was started on 1964 and completed in 1971.
