= Mukunomi Bosai Dam =

Dam in Gifu Prefecture, Japan

- Location within Japan
- Location: Gifu Prefecture, Japan
- Coordinates: 35°22′26″N 137°21′04″E
- Construction began: 1965
- Opening date: 1968

Dam and spillways
- Height: 26.9 m (88 ft)
- Length: 107.5 m (353 ft)

Reservoir
- Total capacity: 440 thousand cubic meters
- Catchment area: 3.7 sq. km
- Surface area: 4 hectares

Mukunomi Bosai Dam is an earthfill dam located in Gifu Prefecture in Japan. The dam is used for flood control. The catchment area of the dam is 3.7 km^{2}. The dam impounds about 4 ha of land when full and can store 440 thousand cubic meters of water. The construction of the dam was started on 1965 and completed in 1968.
