= Fuwa-hokubu Bosai Dam =

Dam in Gifu Prefecture, Japan

- Location within Japan
- Interactive map of Fuwa-hokubu Bosai Dam
- Location: Gifu Prefecture, Japan
- Coordinates: 35°23′51″N 136°29′22″E
- Construction began: 1973
- Opening date: 1985

Dam and spillways
- Height: 42.5 m (139 ft)
- Length: 142 m (466 ft)

Reservoir
- Total capacity: 1128 thousand cubic meters
- Catchment area: 5.7 sq. km
- Surface area: 9 hectares

Fuwa-hokubu Bosai Dam is an earthfill dam located in Gifu Prefecture in Japan. The dam is used for flood control. The catchment area of the dam is 5.7 km^{2}. The dam impounds about 9 ha of land when full and can store 1128 thousand cubic meters of water. The construction of the dam was started on 1973 and completed in 1985.
