= Manada Tameike Dam =

Dam in Gifu Prefecture, Japan

- Location within Japan
- Location: Gifu Prefecture, Japan
- Coordinates: 35°26′25″N 137°7′18″E
- Opening date: 1953

Dam and spillways
- Height: 17 m (56 ft)
- Length: 98 m (322 ft)

Reservoir
- Total capacity: 285 thousand cubic meters
- Catchment area: 1.4 sq. km
- Surface area: 6 hectares

Manada Tameike Dam is an earthfill dam located in Gifu Prefecture in Japan. The dam is used for flood control and irrigation. The catchment area of the dam is 1.4 km^{2}. The dam impounds about 6 ha of land when full and can store 285 thousand cubic meters of water. The construction of the dam was completed in 1953.
