= Nenoue-ko Dam =

Dam in Gifu Prefecture, Japan

- Location within Japan
- Location: Gifu Prefecture, Japan
- Coordinates: 35°26′39″N 137°29′55″E
- Construction began: 1957
- Opening date: 1964

Dam and spillways
- Height: 15 m (49 ft)
- Length: 166 m (545 ft)

Reservoir
- Total capacity: 332 thousand cubic meters
- Catchment area: 0.2 sq. km
- Surface area: hectares

Nenoue-ko Dam is an earthfill dam located in Gifu Prefecture in Japan. The dam is used for irrigation. The catchment area of the dam is 0.2 km^{2}. The dam impounds about ha of land when full and can store 332 thousand cubic meters of water. The construction of the dam was started on 1957 and completed in 1964.
