= Takahashi Dam =

Dam in Gifu Prefecture, Japan

- Location within Japan
- Location: Gifu Prefecture, Japan
- Coordinates: 35°28′15″N 136°29′03″E
- Construction began: 1916
- Opening date: 1919

Dam and spillways
- Height: 18.5 m (61 ft)
- Length: 67.5 m (221 ft)

Reservoir
- Total capacity: 39,000 m^{3} (1,400,000 cu ft)
- Catchment area: 10.6 km^{2} (4.1 sq mi)
- Surface area: 1 hectare (2.5 acres)

Takahashi Dam is a gravity dam located in Gifu Prefecture in Japan. The dam is used for power production. The catchment area of the dam is 10.6 km^{2}. The dam impounds about 1 ha of land when full and can store 39 thousand cubic meters of water. The construction of the dam was started on 1916 and completed in 1919.
