= Kashimo Bosai Dam =

Dam in Gifu Prefecture, Japan

- Location within Japan
- Interactive map of Kashimo Bosai Dam
- Location: Gifu Prefecture, Japan
- Coordinates: 35°45′33″N 137°20′38″E
- Construction began: 1969
- Opening date: 1975

Dam and spillways
- Height: 35.6 m (117 ft)
- Length: 119.8 m (393 ft)

Reservoir
- Total capacity: 733 thousand cubic meters
- Catchment area: 16 sq. km
- Surface area: 7 hectares

Kashimo Bosai Dam is a gravity dam located in Gifu Prefecture in Japan. The dam is used for flood control. The catchment area of the dam is 16 km^{2}. The dam impounds about 7 ha of land when full and can store 733 thousand cubic meters of water. The construction of the dam was started on 1969 and completed in 1975.
