= Sakagami Dam =

Dam in Gifu Prefecture, Japan

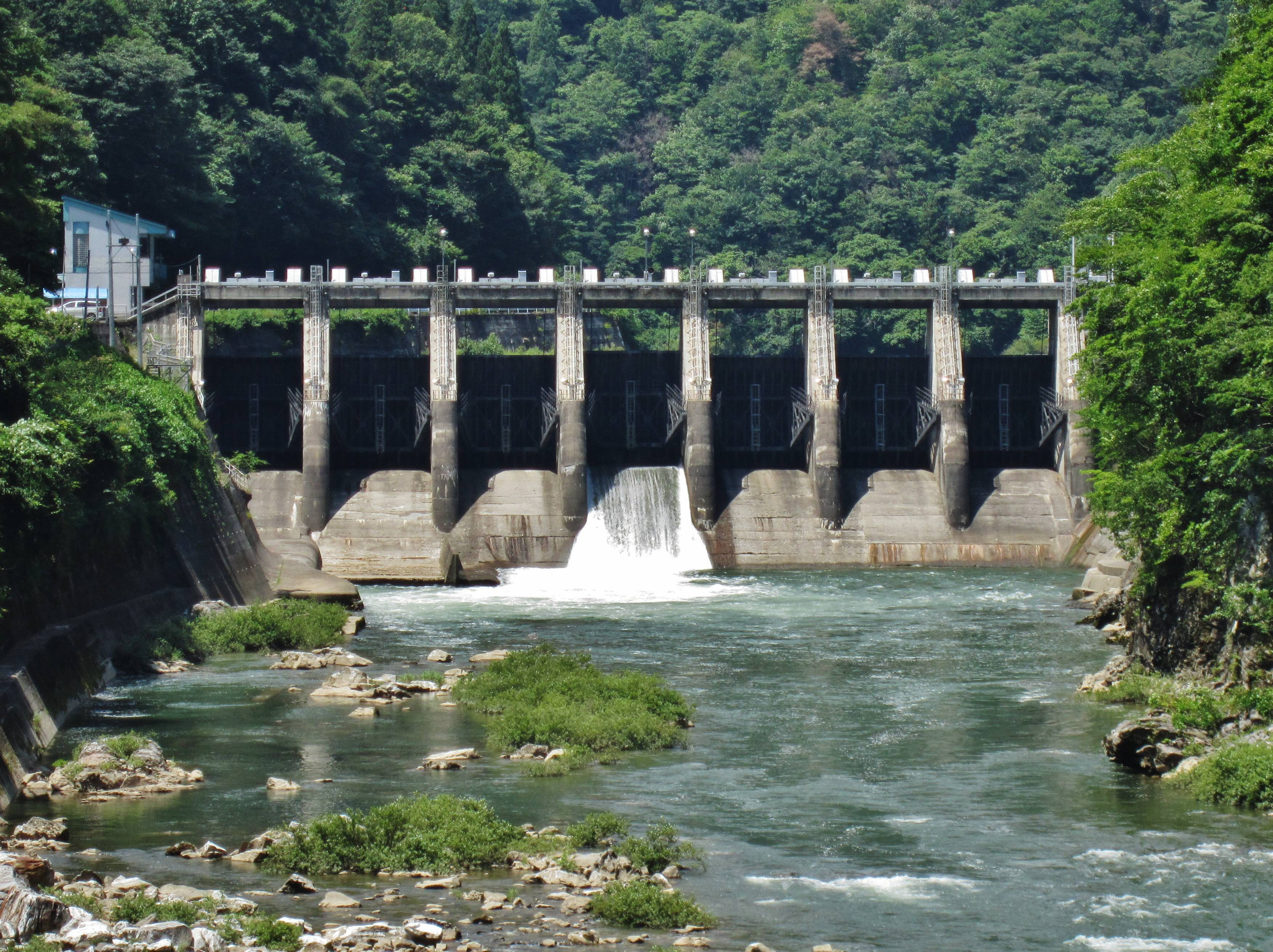

- Location within Japan
- Location: Gifu Prefecture, Japan
- Coordinates: 36°18′50″N 137°7′22″E
- Construction began: 1952
- Opening date: 1953

Dam and spillways
- Height: 23.5 m (77 ft)
- Length: 100 m (330 ft)

Reservoir
- Total capacity: 1,839,000 m^{3} (64,900,000 cu ft)
- Catchment area: 1,022.9 km^{2} (394.9 sq mi)
- Surface area: 32 hectares (79 acres)

Sakagami Dam is a gravity dam located in Gifu Prefecture in Japan. The dam is used for power production. The catchment area of the dam is 1022.9 km^{2}. The dam impounds about 32 ha of land when full and can store 1839 thousand cubic meters of water. The construction of the dam started in 1952 and was completed in 1953.
