= Kamiiida Choseichi Dam =

Dam in Gifu Prefecture, Japan

Kamiiida Choseichi
- Location within Japan
- Interactive map of Kamiiida Choseichi
- Location: Gifu Prefecture, Japan
- Coordinates: 35°29′00″N 137°5′05″E
- Construction began: 1965
- Opening date: 1975

Dam and spillways
- Height: 16.1 m (53 ft)
- Length: 78.1 m (256 ft)

Reservoir
- Total capacity: 70 thousand cubic meters
- Catchment area: 0.1 sq. km
- Surface area: 2 hectares

Kamiiida Choseichi is an earthfill dam located in Gifu Prefecture in Japan. The dam is used for irrigation and water supply. The catchment area of the dam is 0.1 km^{2}. The dam impounds about 2 ha of land when full and can store 70 thousand cubic meters of water. The construction of the dam was started on 1965 and completed in 1975.
