= Hachiya Dam =

Dam in Gifu Prefecture, Japan

- Location within Japan
- Interactive map of Hachiya Dam
- Location: Gifu Prefecture, Japan
- Coordinates: 35°28′36″N 137°1′37″E
- Construction began: 1975
- Opening date: 1978

Dam and spillways
- Height: 30 m (98 ft)
- Length: 144.5 m (474 ft)

Reservoir
- Total capacity: 631 thousand cubic meters
- Catchment area: 20 sq. km
- Surface area: 7 hectares

Hachiya Dam is an earthfill dam located in Gifu Prefecture in Japan. The dam is used for irrigation. The catchment area of the dam is 20 km^{2}. The dam impounds about 7 ha of land when full and can store 631 thousand cubic meters of water. The construction of the dam was started on 1975 and completed in 1978.
