= Sakashimagawa Bosai Dam =

Dam in Gifu Prefecture, Japan

- Location within Japan
- Location: Gifu Prefecture, Japan
- Coordinates: 35°25′03″N 137°17′20″E
- Construction began: 1960
- Opening date: 1963

Dam and spillways
- Height: 19.7 m (65 ft)
- Length: 100 m (330 ft)

Reservoir
- Total capacity: 698,000 m^{3} (24,600,000 cu ft)
- Catchment area: 4 km^{2} (1.5 sq mi)
- Surface area: 11 hectares (27 acres)

Sakashimagawa Bosai Dam is an earthfill dam located in Gifu Prefecture in Japan. The dam is used for flood control. The catchment area of the dam is 4 km^{2}. The dam impounds about 11 ha of land when full and can store 698 thousand cubic meters of water. The construction of the dam was started on 1960 and completed in 1963.
