= Ohbora Bosai Dam =

Dam in Gifu Prefecture, Japan

- Location within Japan
- Location: Gifu Prefecture, Japan
- Coordinates: 35°24′41″N 137°9′31″E
- Construction began: 1947
- Opening date: 1952

Dam and spillways
- Height: 16.8 m (55 ft)
- Length: 88.6 m (291 ft)

Reservoir
- Total capacity: 43,000 m^{3} (1,500,000 cu ft)
- Catchment area: 0.4 km^{2} (0.15 sq mi)
- Surface area: 1 hectare (2.5 acres)

Ohbora Bosai Dam is a gravity dam located in Gifu Prefecture in Japan. The dam is used for flood control and irrigation. The catchment area of the dam is 0.4 km^{2}. The dam impounds about 1 ha of land when full and can store 43 thousand cubic meters of water. The construction of the dam was started on 1947 and completed in 1952.
