= Origawa Dam =

Dam in Gifu Prefecture, Japan

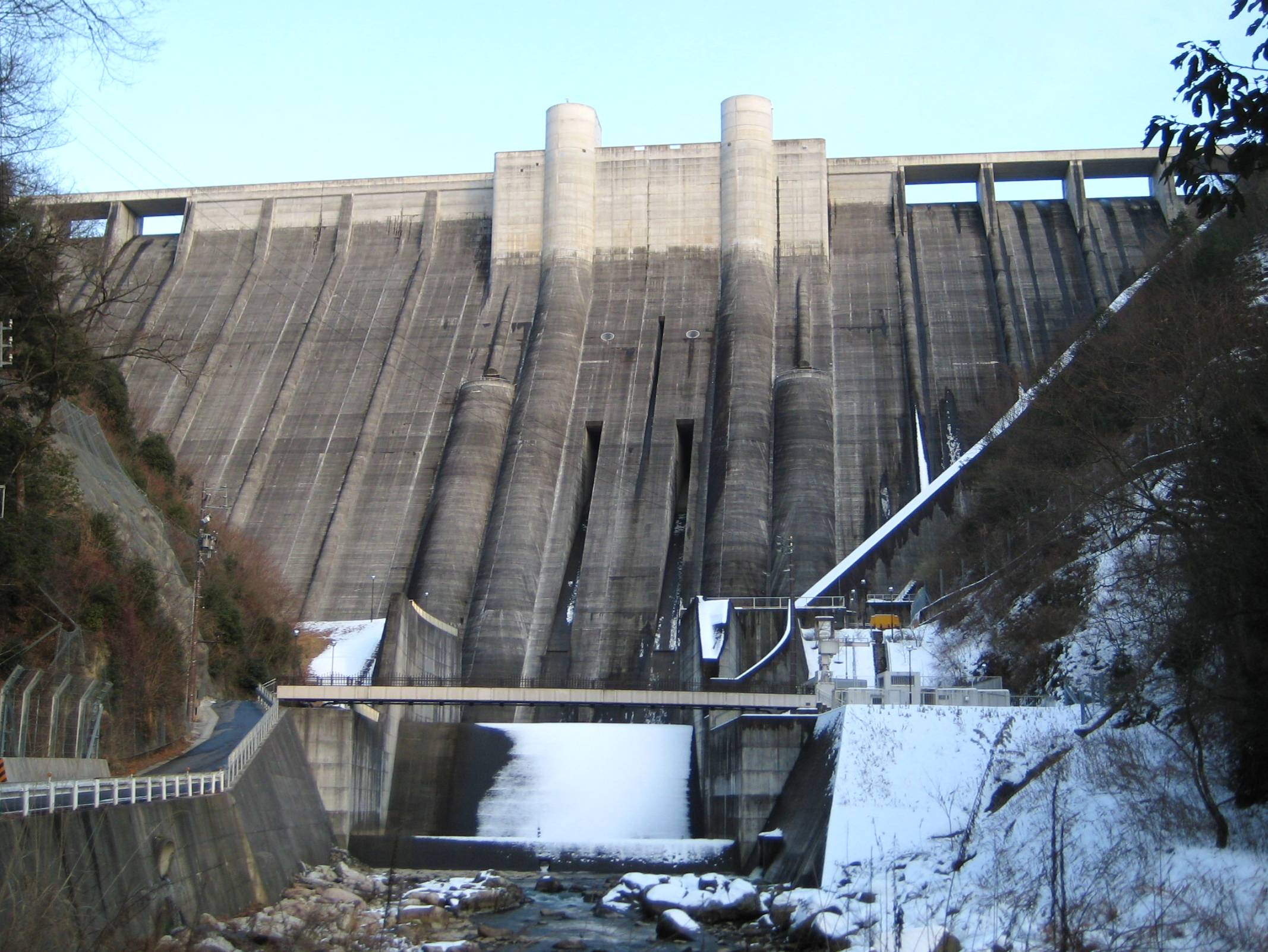

- Location within Japan
- Location: Gifu Prefecture, Japan
- Coordinates: 35°19′42″N 137°18′10″E
- Construction began: 1979
- Opening date: 2003

Dam and spillways
- Height: 114 m (374 ft)
- Length: 331.3 m (1,087 ft)

Reservoir
- Total capacity: 15,100,000 m^{3} (530,000,000 cu ft)
- Catchment area: 55 km^{2} (21 sq mi)
- Surface area: 111 hectares (270 acres)

Origawa Dam is a gravity dam located in Gifu Prefecture in Japan. The dam is used for flood control and power production. The catchment area of the dam is 55 km^{2}. The dam impounds about 111 ha of land when full and can store 15100 thousand cubic meters of water. The construction of the dam was started on 1979 and completed in 2003.
