= Kanedaira Bosai Dam =

Dam in Gifu Prefecture, Japan

- Location within Japan
- Interactive map of Kanedaira Bosai Dam
- Location: Gifu Prefecture, Japan
- Coordinates: 35°20′34″N 137°25′42″E
- Construction began: 1975
- Opening date: 1987

Dam and spillways
- Height: 38.5 m (126 ft)
- Length: 130 m (430 ft)

Reservoir
- Total capacity: 412 thousand cubic meters
- Catchment area: 2.2 sq. km
- Surface area: 4 hectares

Kanedaira Bosai Dam is an earthfill dam located in Gifu Prefecture in Japan. The dam is used for flood control. The catchment area of the dam is 2.2 km^{2}. The dam impounds about 4 ha of land when full and can store 412 thousand cubic meters of water. The construction of the dam was started on 1975 and completed in 1987.
