= Maesawa Dam =

Dam in Gifu Prefecture, Japan

- Location within Japan
- Location: Gifu Prefecture, Japan
- Coordinates: 35°26′04″N 137°11′37″E
- Construction began: 1971
- Opening date: 1980

Dam and spillways
- Height: 38 m (125 ft)
- Length: 171 m (561 ft)

Reservoir
- Total capacity: 2025 thousand cubic meters
- Catchment area: 4.8 sq. km
- Surface area: 19 hectares

Maesawa Dam is an earthfill dam located in Gifu Prefecture in Japan. The dam is used for irrigation. The catchment area of the dam is 4.8 km^{2}. The dam impounds about 19 ha of land when full and can store 2025 thousand cubic meters of water. The construction of the dam was started on 1971 and completed in 1980.
