= Ochiai Dam (Gifu) =

Dam in Gifu Prefecture, Japan

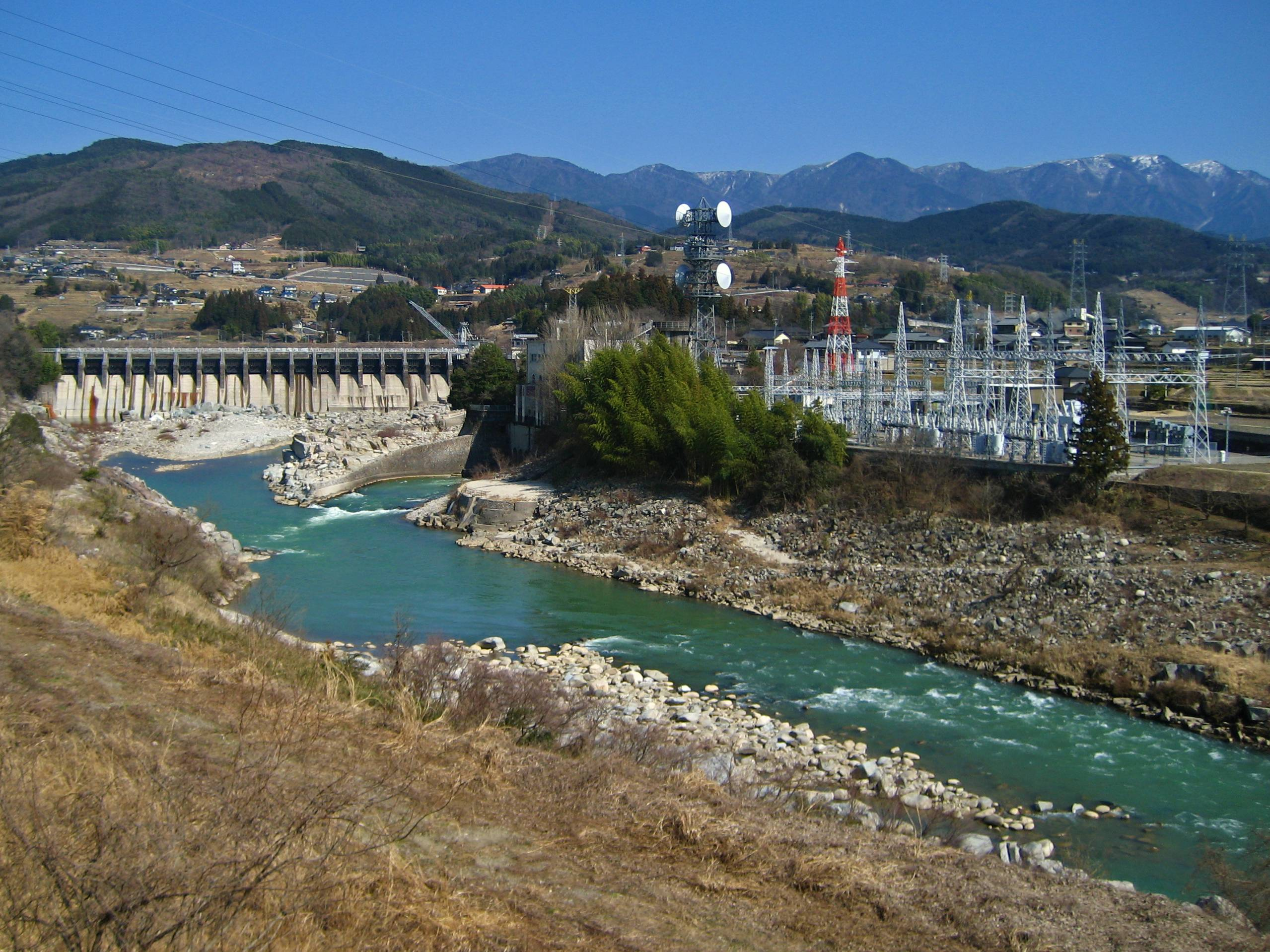

- Location within Japan
- Location: Gifu Prefecture, Japan
- Coordinates: 35°31′17″N 137°31′31″E
- Construction began: 1925
- Opening date: 1926

Dam and spillways
- Height: 33.3 m (109 ft)
- Length: 215.1 m (706 ft)

Reservoir
- Total capacity: 3,872,000 m^{3} (136,700,000 cu ft)
- Catchment area: 1,747 km^{2} (675 sq mi)
- Surface area: 45 hectares (110 acres)

Ochiai Dam is a gravity dam located in Gifu Prefecture in Japan. The dam is used for power production. The catchment area of the dam is 1747 km^{2}. The dam impounds about 45 ha of land when full and can store 3872 thousand cubic meters of water. The construction of the dam was started on 1925 and completed in 1926.
