= Ozawa Tameike Dam =

Dam in Gifu Prefecture, Japan

- Location within Japan
- Location: Gifu Prefecture, Japan
- Coordinates: 35°24′30″N 137°25′11″E
- Opening date: 1965

Dam and spillways
- Height: 32 m (105 ft)
- Length: 141 m (463 ft)

Reservoir
- Total capacity: 946,000 m^{3} (33,400,000 cu ft)
- Catchment area: 7.1 km^{2} (2.7 sq mi)
- Surface area: 11 hectares (27 acres)

Ozawa Tameike Dam is an earthfill dam located in Gifu Prefecture in Japan. The dam is used for irrigation. The catchment area of the dam is 7.1 km^{2}. The dam impounds about 11 ha of land when full and can store 946 thousand cubic meters of water. The construction of the dam was started on and completed in 1965.
