= Higashiueda Dam =

Dam in Gifu Prefecture, Japan

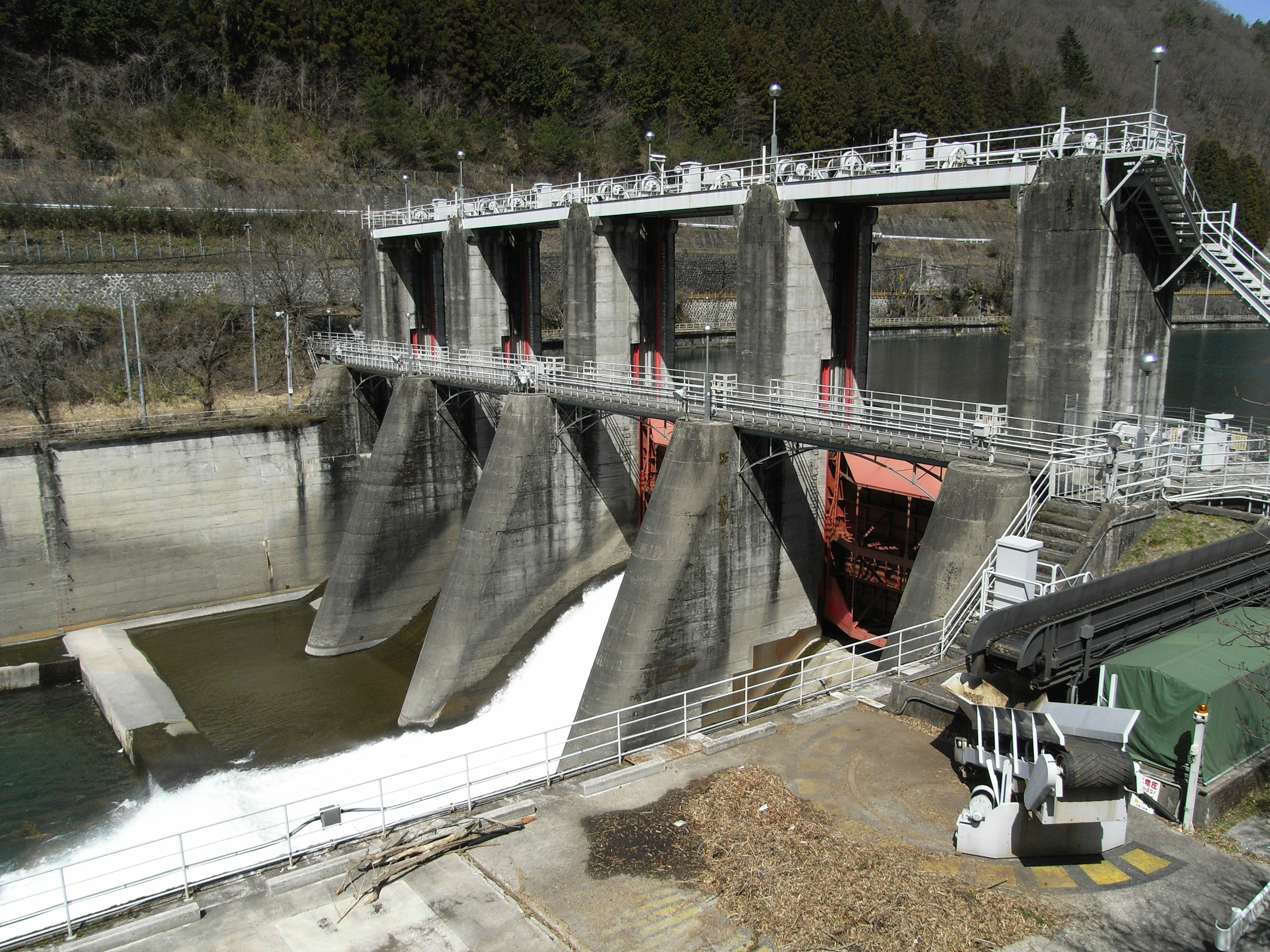

- Location within Japan
- Interactive map of Higashiueda Dam
- Location: Gifu Prefecture, Japan
- Coordinates: 35°56′31″N 137°15′04″E
- Construction began: 1952
- Opening date: 1954

Dam and spillways
- Height: 18 m (59 ft)
- Length: 104 m (341 ft)

Reservoir
- Total capacity: 1065 thousand cubic meters
- Catchment area: 770 sq. km
- Surface area: 21 hectares

Higashiueda Dam is a gravity dam located in Gifu Prefecture in Japan. The dam is used for power production. The catchment area of the dam is 770 km^{2}. The dam impounds about 21 ha of land when full and can store 1065 thousand cubic meters of water. The construction of the dam was started on 1952 and completed in 1954.
