= Tazawa Bosai Dam =

Dam in Gifu Prefecture, Japan

- Location within Japan
- Location: Gifu Prefecture, Japan
- Coordinates: 35°19′53″N 137°24′08″E
- Construction began: 1975
- Opening date: 1993

Dam and spillways
- Height: 29.5 m (97 ft)
- Length: 109 m (358 ft)

Reservoir
- Total capacity: 248,000 m^{3} (8,800,000 cu ft)
- Catchment area: 1.4 km^{2} (0.54 sq mi)
- Surface area: 3 hectares (7.4 acres)

Tazawa Bosai Dam is an earthfill dam located in Gifu Prefecture in Japan. The dam is used for flood control. The catchment area of the dam is 1.4 km^{2}. The dam impounds about 3 ha of land when full and can store 248 thousand cubic meters of water. The construction of the dam was started on 1975 and completed in 1993.
