= Kuguno Bosai Dam =

Dam in Gifu Prefecture, Japan

- Location within Japan
- Location: Gifu Prefecture, Japan
- Coordinates: 36°1′39″N 137°12′52″E
- Construction began: 1965
- Opening date: 1974

Dam and spillways
- Height: 28 m (92 ft)
- Length: 338 m (1,109 ft)

Reservoir
- Total capacity: 1462 thousand cubic meters
- Catchment area: 4.9 sq. km
- Surface area: 16 hectares

Kuguno Bosai Dam is an earthfill dam located in Gifu Prefecture in Japan. The dam is used for flood control. The catchment area of the dam is 4.9 km^{2}. The dam impounds about 16 ha of land when full and can store 1462 thousand cubic meters of water. The construction of the dam was started on 1965 and completed in 1974.
