= Nakanoho Dam =

Dam in Gifu Prefecture, Japan

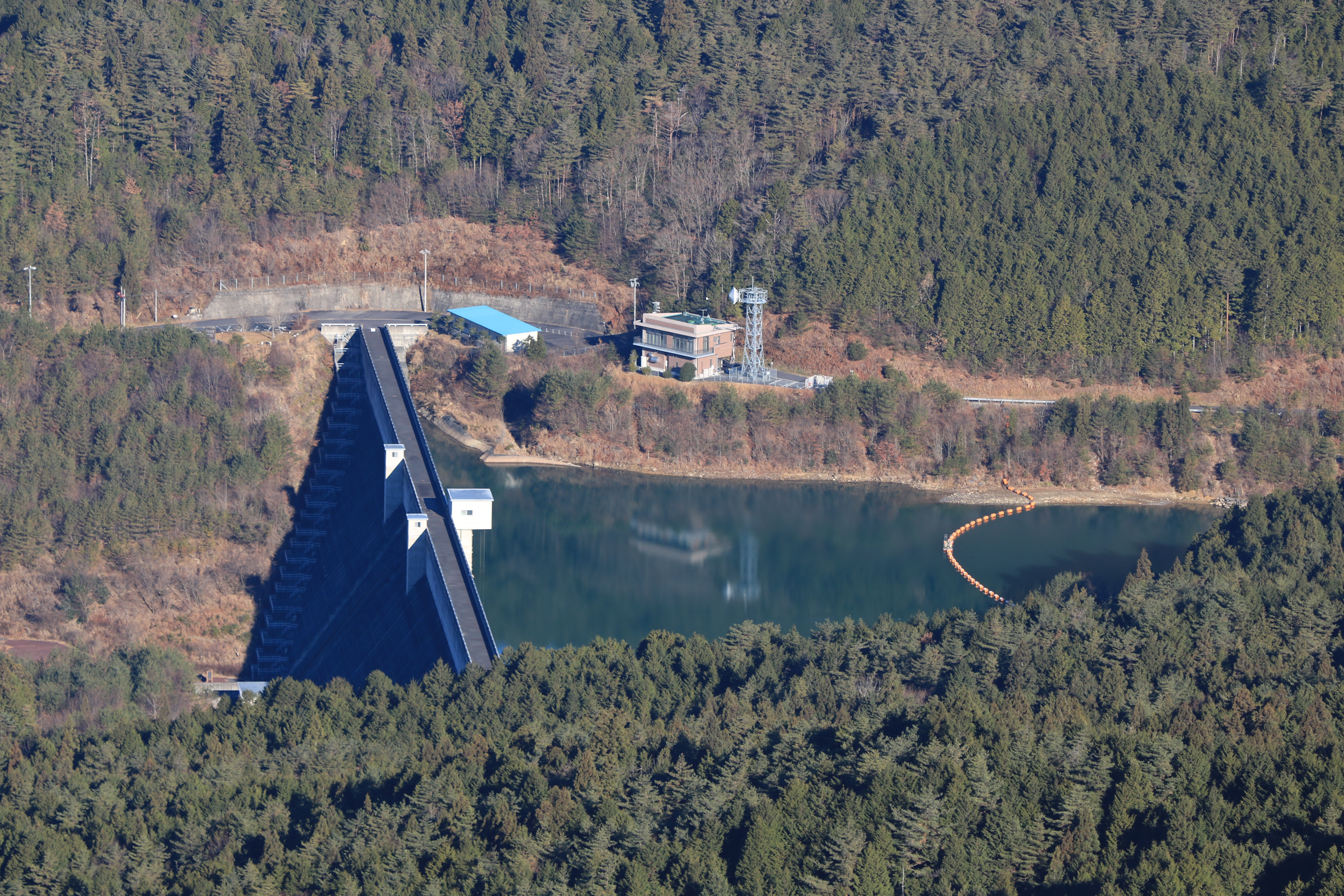

- Location within Japan
- Location: Gifu Prefecture, Japan
- Coordinates: 35°31′47″N 137°20′29″E
- Construction began: 1990
- Opening date: 2005

Dam and spillways
- Height: 41.7 m (137 ft)
- Length: 390 m (1,280 ft)

Reservoir
- Total capacity: 411 thousand cubic meters
- Catchment area: 1.6 sq. km
- Surface area: 5 hectares

Nakanoho Dam is a gravity dam located in Gifu Prefecture in Japan. The dam is used for flood control and water supply. The catchment area of the dam is 1.6 km^{2}. The dam impounds about 5 ha of land when full and can store 411,000 cubic meters of water. Construction on the dam began in 1990 and was completed in 2005.
