= Utsubo Dam =

Dam in Gifu Prefecture, Japan

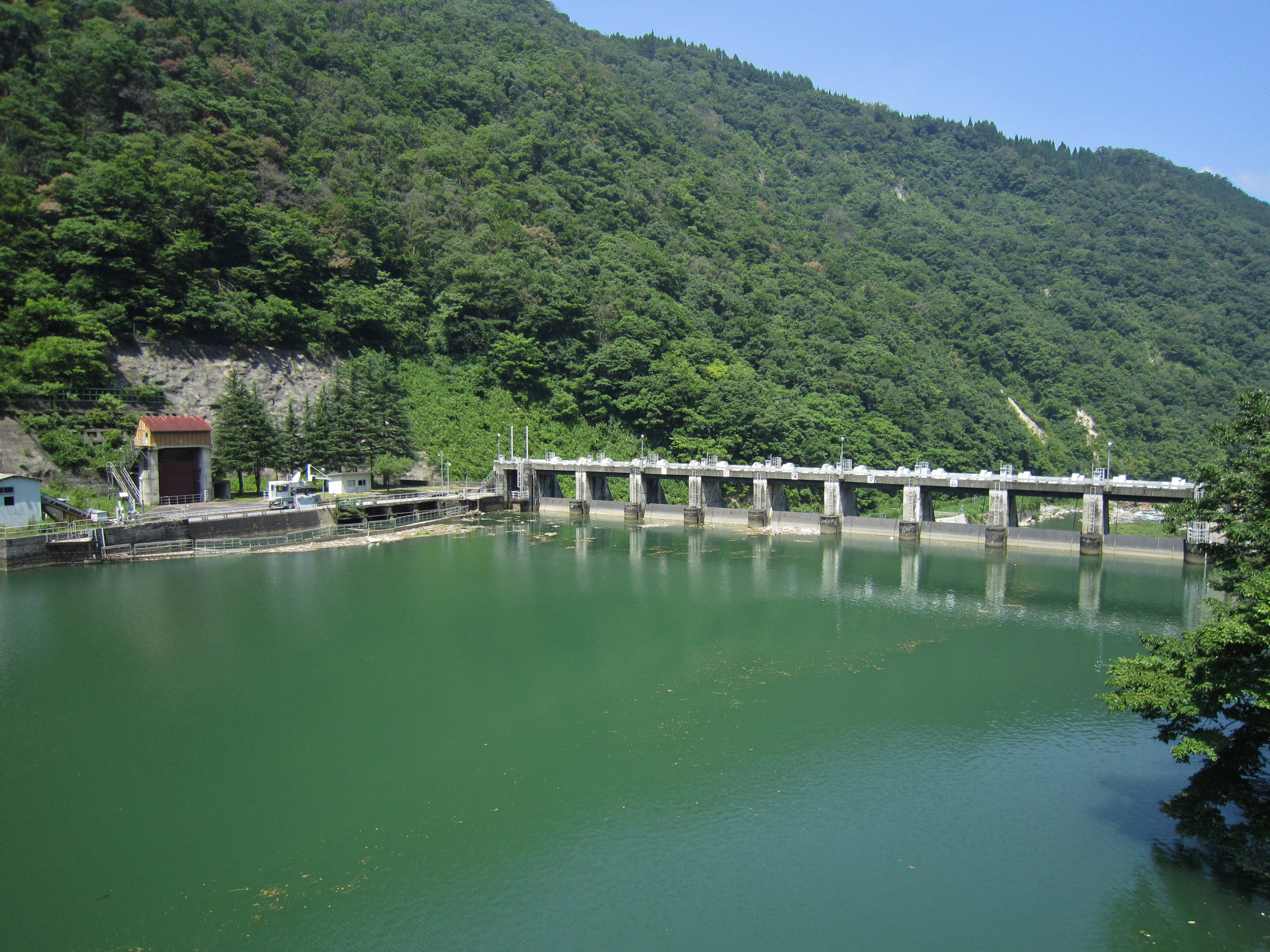

- Location within Japan
- Location: Gifu Prefecture, Japan
- Coordinates: 36°20′22″N 137°9′59″E
- Construction began: 1952
- Opening date: 1953

Dam and spillways
- Height: 25.5 m (84 ft)
- Length: 155.7 m (511 ft)

Reservoir
- Total capacity: 4,524,000 m^{3} (159,800,000 cu ft)
- Catchment area: 1,052.5 km^{2} (406.4 sq mi)
- Surface area: 53 hectares (130 acres)

Utsubo Dam is a gravity dam located in Gifu Prefecture in Japan. The dam is used for power production. The catchment area of the dam is 1052.5 km^{2}. The dam impounds about 53 ha of land when full and can store 4524 thousand cubic meters of water. The construction of the dam was started on 1952 and completed in 1953.
