= Kaore Dam =

Dam in Gifu Prefecture, Japan

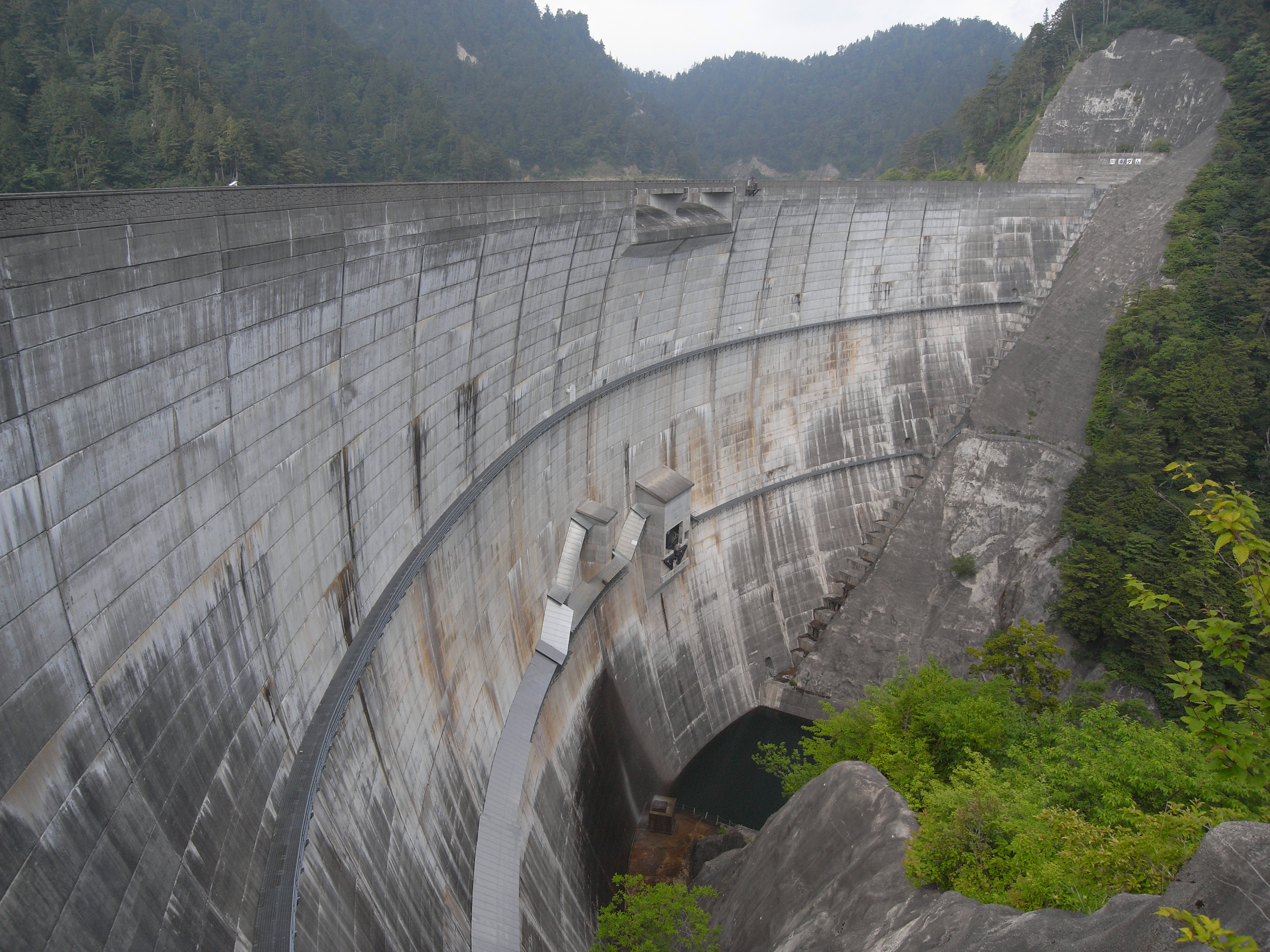

- Location within Japan
- Interactive map of Kaore Dam
- Location: Gifu Prefecture, Japan
- Coordinates: 35°44′09″N 136°41′29″E
- Construction began: 1976
- Opening date: 1995

Dam and spillways
- Height: 107.5 m (353 ft)
- Length: 341.2 m (1,119 ft)

Reservoir
- Total capacity: 17200 thousand cubic meters
- Catchment area: 2.5 sq. km
- Surface area: 39 hectares

Kaore Dam is an arch dam located in Gifu Prefecture in Japan. The dam is used for power production. The catchment area of the dam is 2.5 km^{2}. The dam impounds about 39 ha of land when full and can store 17200 thousand cubic meters of water. The construction of the dam was started on 1976 and completed in 1995.
