= Imawatari Dam =

Dam in Gifu Prefecture, Japan

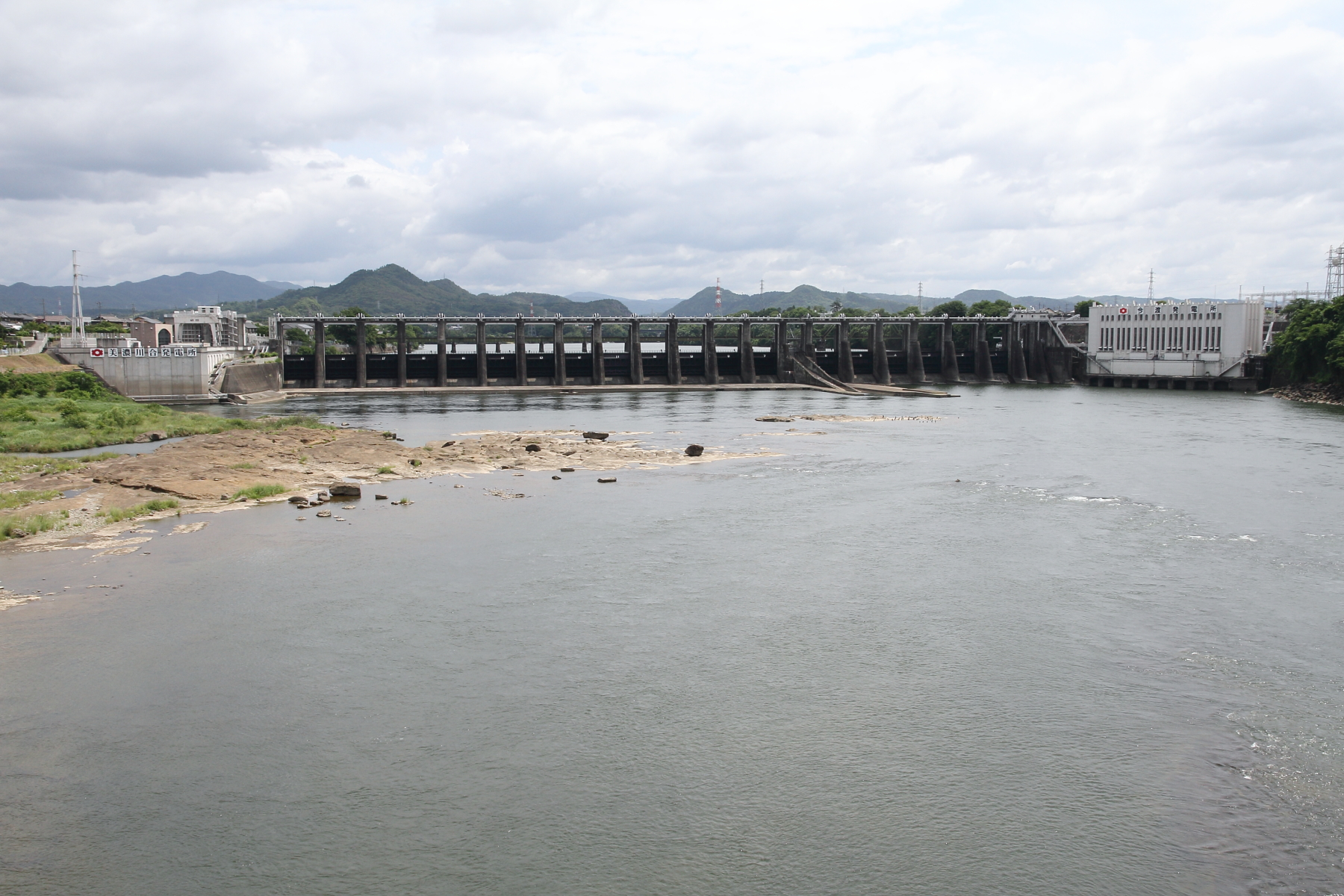

- Location within Japan
- Interactive map of Imawatari Dam
- Location: Gifu Prefecture, Japan
- Coordinates: 35°26′29″N 137°2′43″E
- Construction began: 1936
- Opening date: 1939

Dam and spillways
- Height: 34.3 m (113 ft)
- Length: 308 m (1,010 ft)

Reservoir
- Total capacity: 9470 thousand cubic meters
- Catchment area: 4632.3 sq. km
- Surface area: 141 hectares

Imawatari Dam is a gravity dam located in Gifu Prefecture in Japan. The dam is used for power production. The catchment area of the dam is 4632.3 km^{2}. The dam impounds about 141 ha of land when full and can store 9470 thousand cubic meters of water. The construction of the dam was started on 1936 and completed in 1939.
