= Fukaya Dam =

Dam in Gifu Prefecture, Japan

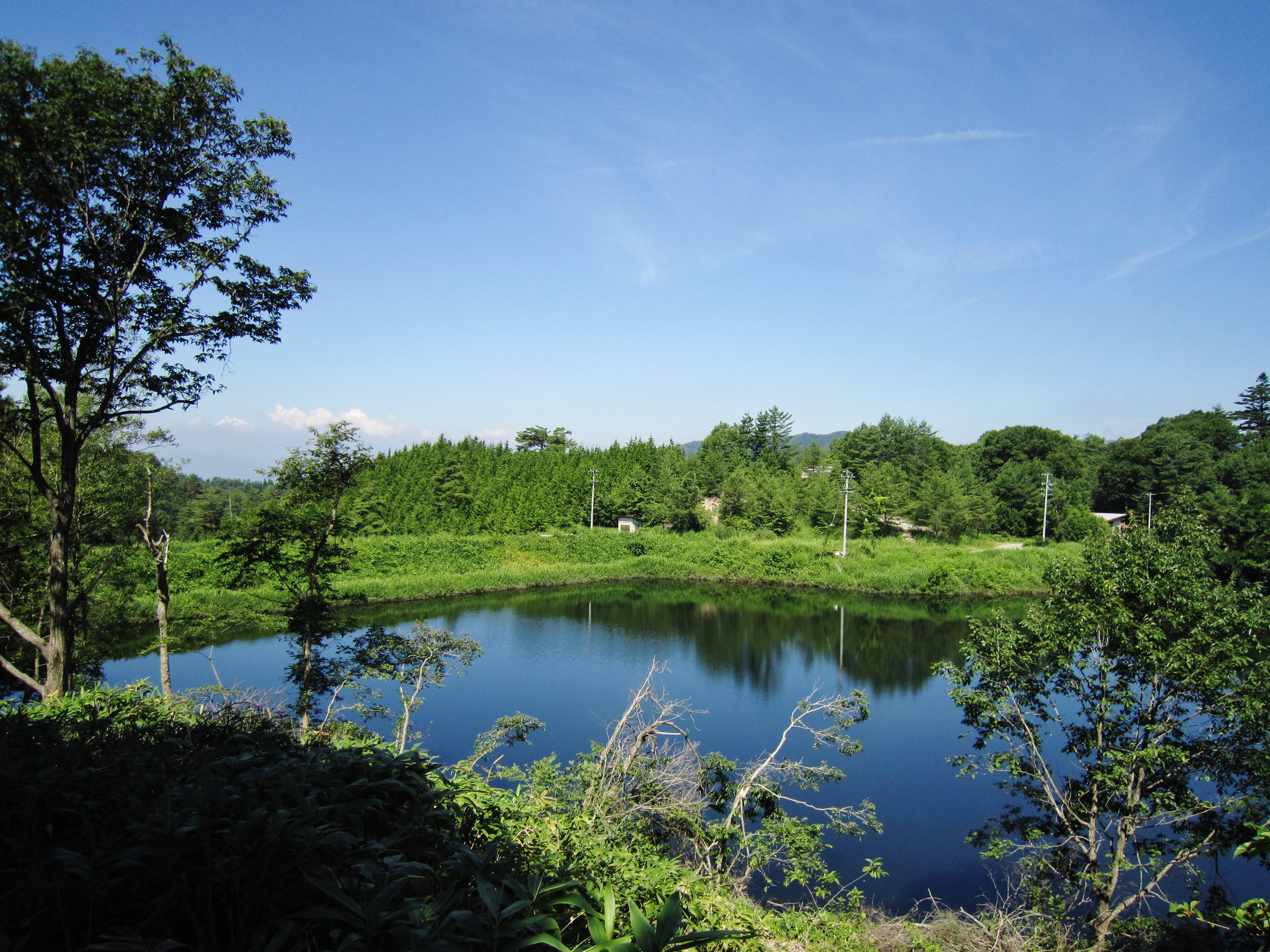

- Location within Japan
- Interactive map of Fukaya Dam
- Location: Gifu Prefecture, Japan
- Coordinates: 36°10′46″N 137°20′46″E
- Opening date: 1973

Dam and spillways
- Height: 27.3 m (90 ft)
- Length: 103 m (338 ft)

Reservoir
- Total capacity: 300 thousand cubic meters
- Catchment area: 0.9 sq. km
- Surface area: 5 hectares

Fukaya Dam is a rockfill dam located in Gifu Prefecture in Japan. The dam is used for irrigation. The catchment area of the dam is 0.9 km^{2}. The dam impounds about 5 ha of land when full and can store 300 thousand cubic meters of water. The construction of the dam was started on and completed in 1973.
