= Atagi Dam =

Dam in Gifu Prefecture, Japan

- Location within Japan
- Interactive map of Atagi Dam
- Location: Gifu Prefecture, Japan
- Coordinates: 35°54′14″N 136°54′11″E
- Construction began: 1973
- Opening date: 1987

Dam and spillways
- Height: 71.4 m (234 ft)
- Length: 200 m (660 ft)

Reservoir
- Total capacity: 2550 thousand cubic meters
- Catchment area: 16 sq. km
- Surface area: 14 hectares

Atagi Dam is a gravity dam located in Gifu Prefecture in Japan. The dam is used for flood control. The catchment area of the dam is 16 km^{2}. The dam impounds about 14 ha of land when full and can store 2550 thousand cubic meters of water. The construction of the dam was started on 1973 and completed in 1987.
