= Nyukawa Dam =

Dam in Gifu Prefecture, Japan

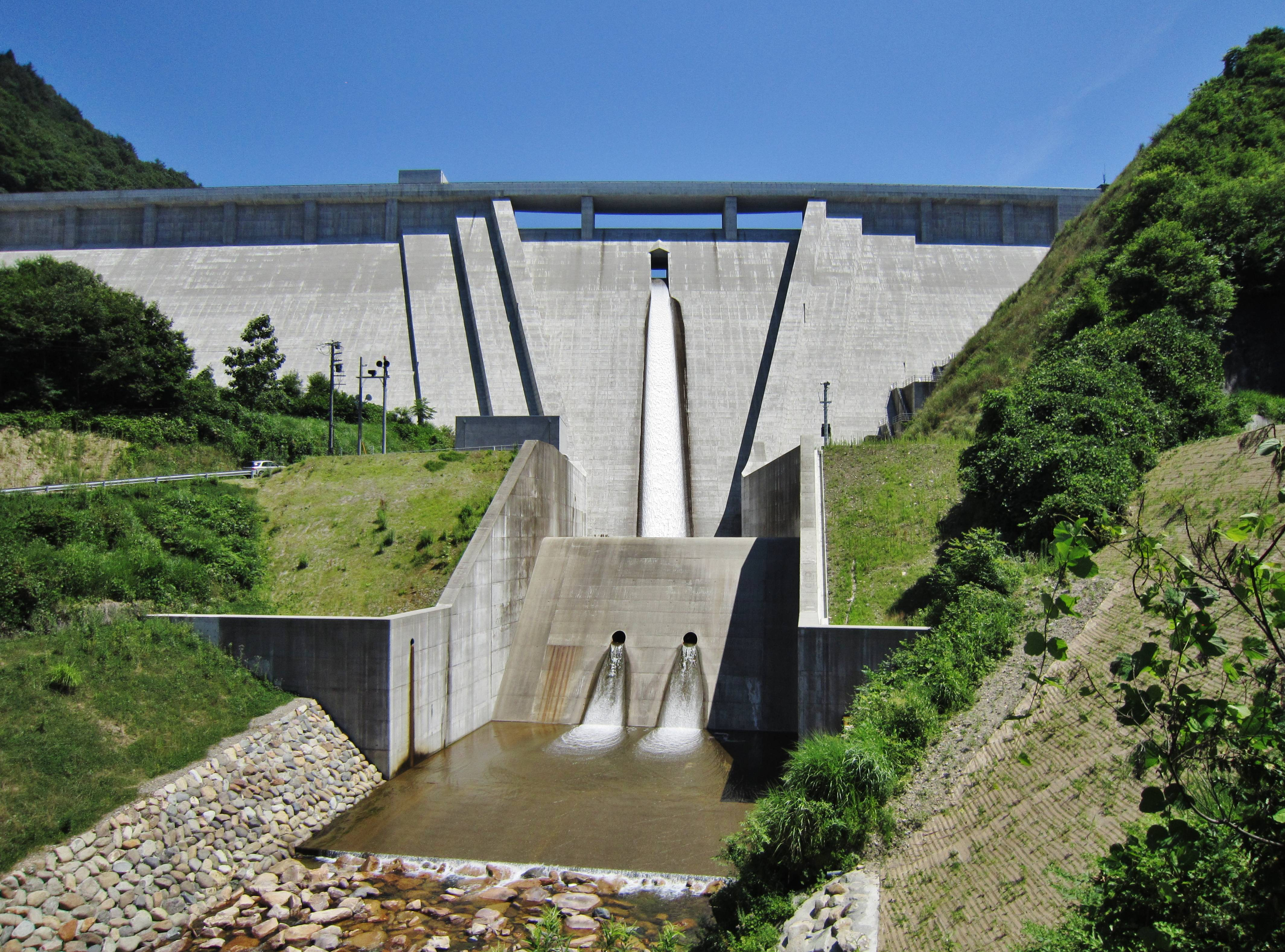

- Location within Japan
- Location: Gifu Prefecture, Japan
- Coordinates: 36°13′01″N 137°22′16″E
- Construction began: 1975
- Opening date: 2012

Dam and spillways
- Height: 69.5 m (228 ft)
- Length: 227 m (745 ft)

Reservoir
- Total capacity: 6,200,000 m^{3} (220,000,000 cu ft)
- Catchment area: 23 km^{2} (8.9 sq mi)
- Surface area: 32 hectares (79 acres)

Nyukawa Dam is a gravity dam located in Gifu Prefecture in Japan. The dam is used for flood control, water supply and power production. The catchment area of the dam is 23 km^{2}. The dam impounds about 32 ha of land when full and can store 6200 thousand cubic meters of water. The construction of the dam was started on 1975 and completed in 2012.
