= Hosobidani Dam =

Coordinates: 35°32′34″N 137°08′14″E

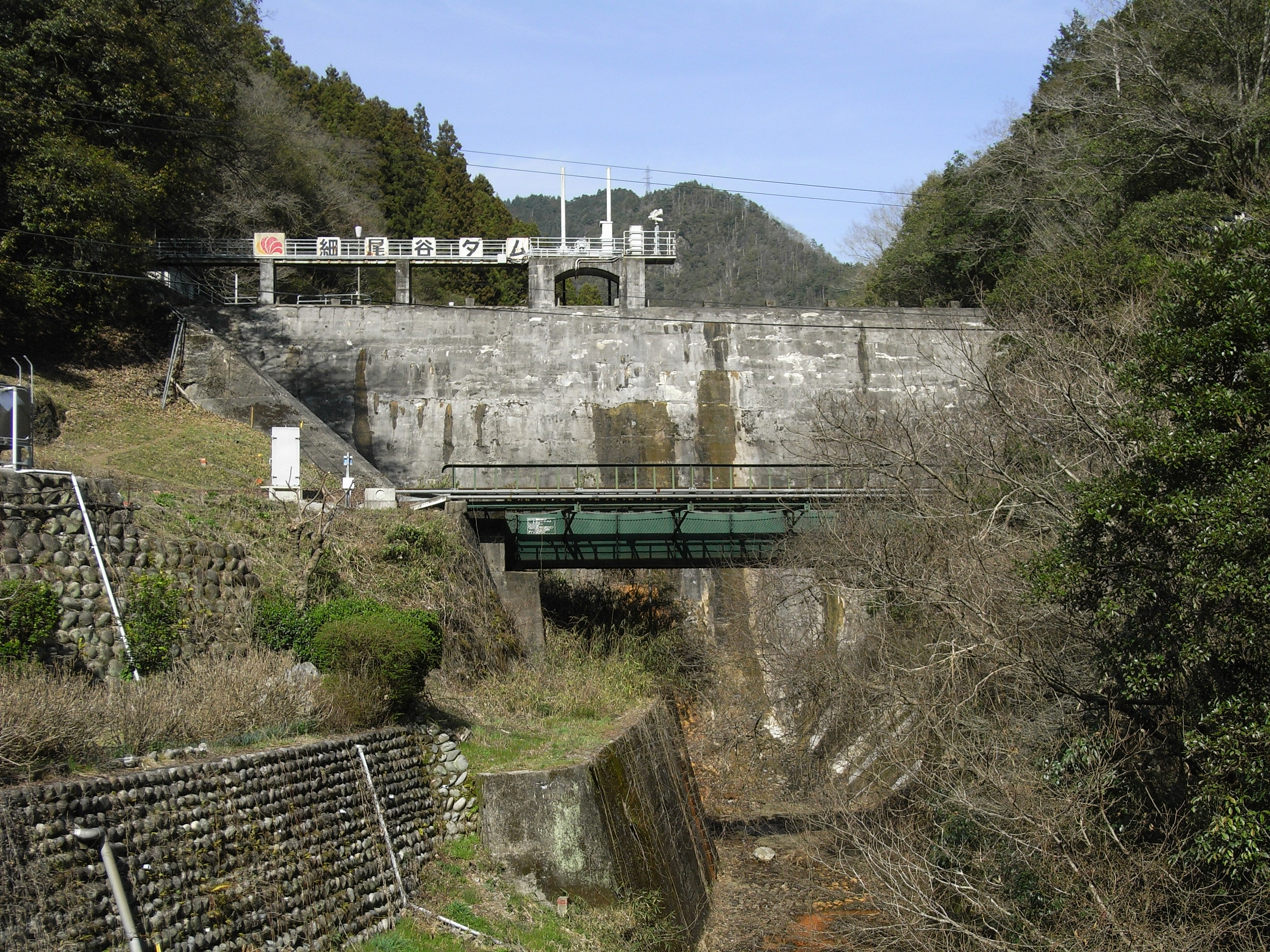
- Official name: 細尾谷ダム
- Location: Hichisō, Gifu, Japan
- Construction began: 1924
- Opening date: 1926

Dam and spillways
- Impounds: Hida River
- Height: 22.4 m
- Length: 59.1 m

Reservoir
- Creates: Hosobedani Chōsei Reservoir
- Total capacity: 71,000 m^{3}
- Catchment area: 2,020.8 km^{2}
- Surface area: 1 ha

The Hosobidani Dam (細尾谷ダム) is a dam in Hichisō, Gifu Prefecture, Japan, completed in 1926.
