= Jintoku Bosai Dam =

Dam in Gifu Prefecture, Japan

- Location within Japan
- Interactive map of Jintoku Bosai Dam
- Location: Gifu Prefecture, Japan
- Coordinates: 35°23′53″N 137°19′13″E
- Opening date: 1957

Dam and spillways
- Height: 24 m (79 ft)
- Length: 123.6 m (406 ft)

Reservoir
- Total capacity: 295 thousand cubic meters
- Catchment area: 1.9 sq. km
- Surface area: 3 hectares

Jintoku Bosai Dam is an earthfill dam located in Gifu Prefecture in Japan. The dam is used for flood control. The catchment area of the dam is 1.9 km^{2}. The dam impounds about 3 ha of land when full and can store 295 thousand cubic meters of water. The construction of the dam was completed in 1957.
