= Kuze Dam =

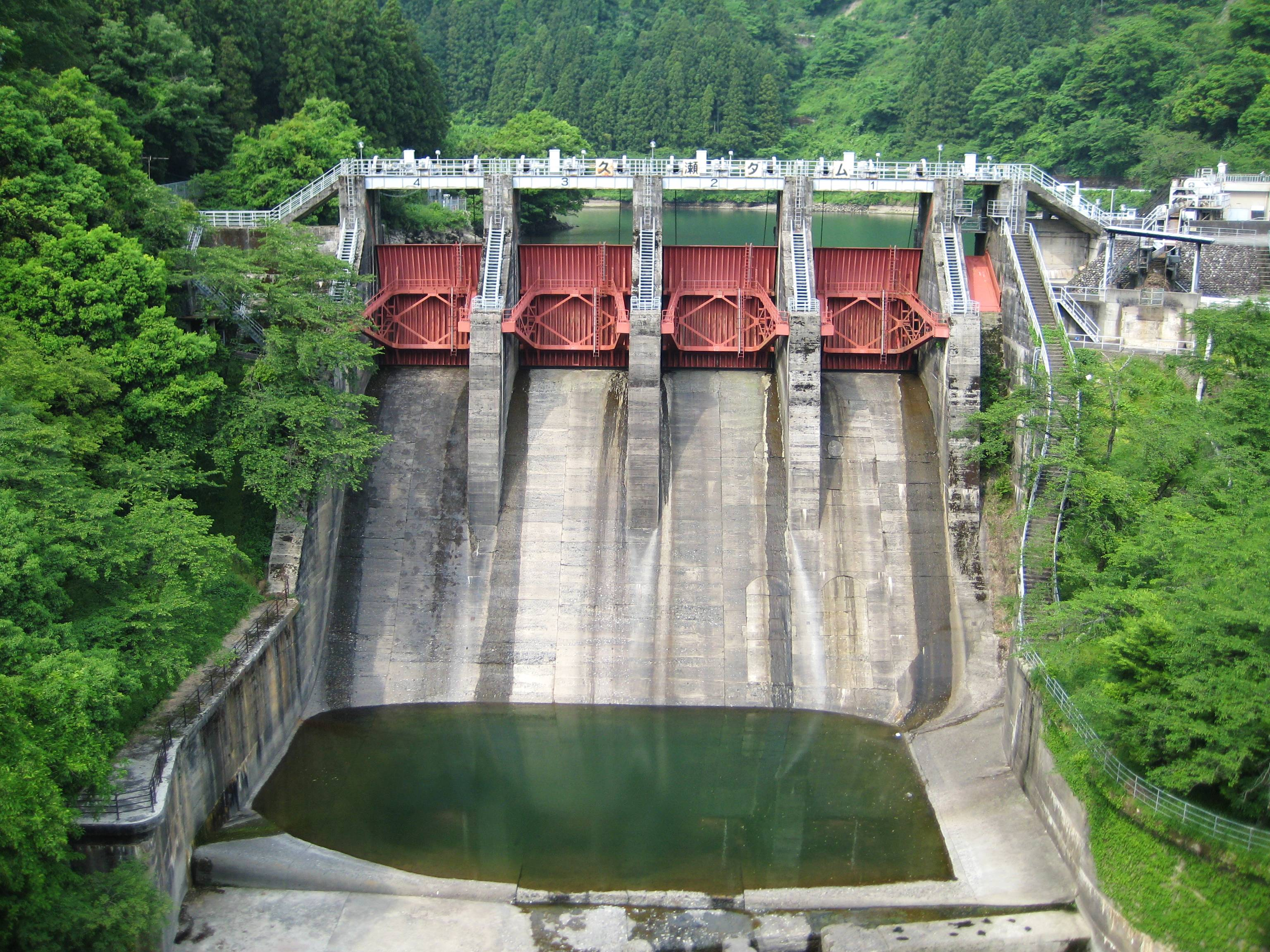
- Location: Ibigawa, Gifu, Japan
- Coordinates: 35°33′42″N 136°30′7″E

Kuze Dam (久瀬ダム, Kuze damu) is a dam in Ibigawa, Gifu Prefecture, Japan, completed in 1953.

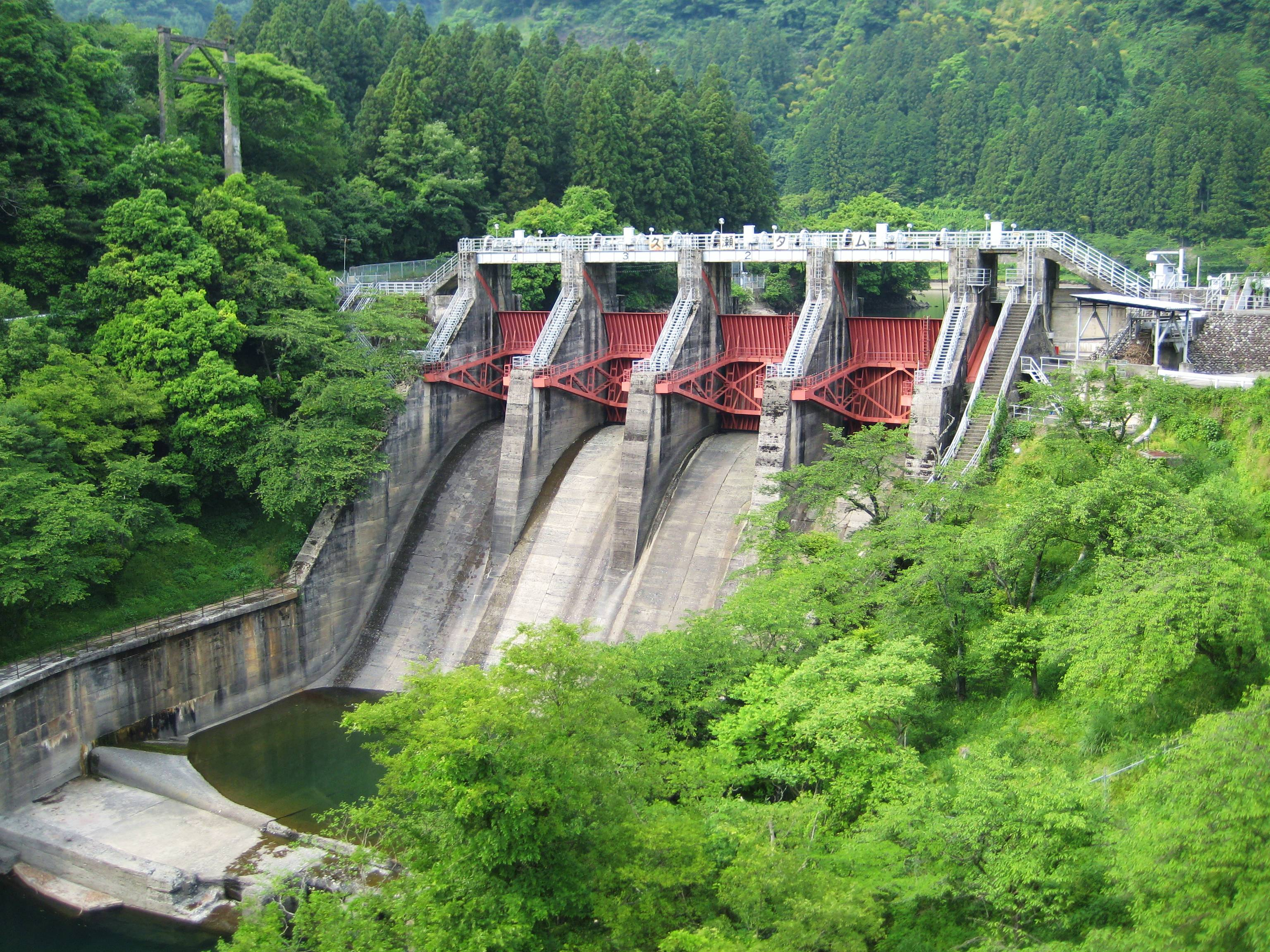
