= Ohgahora Dam =

Dam in Gifu Prefecture, Japan

- Location within Japan
- Location: Gifu Prefecture, Japan
- Coordinates: 35°54′31″N 137°14′37″E
- Construction began: 1988
- Opening date: 1998

Dam and spillways
- Height: 42.5 m (139 ft)
- Length: 238 m (781 ft)

Reservoir
- Total capacity: 450,000 m^{3} (16,000,000 cu ft)
- Catchment area: 4.4 km^{2} (1.7 sq mi)
- Surface area: 4 hectares (9.9 acres)

Ohgahora Dam is a gravity dam located in Gifu Prefecture in Japan. The dam is used for flood control and water supply. The catchment area of the dam is 4.4 km^{2}. The dam impounds about 4 ha of land when full and can store 450 thousand cubic meters of water. The construction of the dam was started on 1988 and completed in 1998.
