= Tsunokawa Dam =

Dam in Gifu Prefecture, Japan

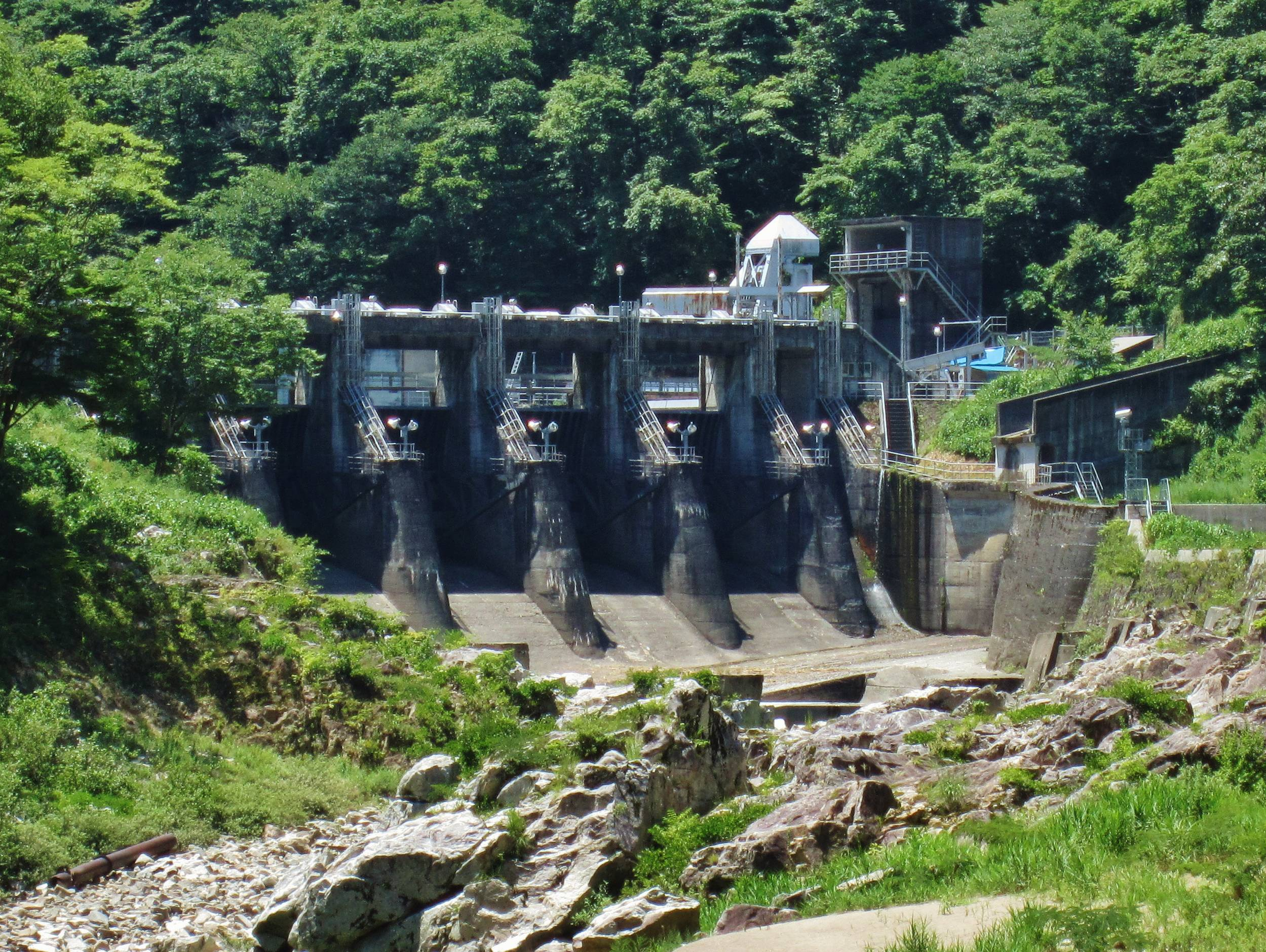

- Location within Japan
- Location: Gifu Prefecture, Japan
- Coordinates: 36°16′47″N 137°7′33″E
- Construction began: 1952
- Opening date: 1955

Dam and spillways
- Height: 21.5 m (71 ft)
- Length: 221.7 m (727 ft)

Reservoir
- Total capacity: 879,000 m^{3} (31,000,000 cu ft)
- Catchment area: 724.5 km^{2} (279.7 sq mi)
- Surface area: 15 hectares (37 acres)

Tsunokawa Dam is a gravity dam located in Gifu Prefecture in Japan. The dam is used for power production. The catchment area of the dam is 724.5 km^{2}. The dam impounds about 15 ha of land when full and can store 879 thousand cubic meters of water. The construction of the dam was started on 1952 and completed in 1955.
