= Yamada Bosai Dam =

Dam in Gifu Prefecture, Japan

- Location within Japan
- Location: Gifu Prefecture, Japan
- Coordinates: 36°17′07″N 137°15′11″E
- Construction began: 1972
- Opening date: 1988

Dam and spillways
- Height: 32.3 m (106 ft)
- Length: 140 m (460 ft)

Reservoir
- Total capacity: 1,246,000 m^{3} (44,000,000 cu ft)
- Catchment area: 14.3 km^{2} (5.5 sq mi)
- Surface area: 13 hectares (32 acres)

Yamada Bosai Dam is an earthfill dam located in Gifu Prefecture in Japan. The dam is used for flood control. The catchment area of the dam is 14.3 km^{2}. The dam impounds about 13 ha of land when full and can store 1246 thousand cubic meters of water. The construction of the dam was started on 1972 and completed in 1988.
