= Hananoko Tameike Dam =

Dam in Gifu Prefecture, Japan

- Location within Japan
- Interactive map of Hananoko Tameike Dam
- Location: Gifu Prefecture, Japan
- Coordinates: 35°35′15″N 137°29′43″E
- Opening date: 1959

Dam and spillways
- Height: 20.7 m (68 ft)
- Length: 293 m (961 ft)

Reservoir
- Total capacity: 1025 thousand cubic meters
- Catchment area: 3.3 sq. km
- Surface area: 16 hectares

Hananoko Tameike Dam is an earthfill dam located in Gifu Prefecture in Japan. The dam is used for irrigation. The catchment area of the dam is 3.3 km^{2}. The dam impounds about 16 ha of land when full and can store 1025 thousand cubic meters of water. The construction of the dam was started on and completed in 1959.
