= Iwamura Dam (Hokkaido) =

Dam in Hokkaido Prefecture, Japan

- Location within Japan
- Interactive map of Iwamura Dam
- Location: Hokkaido Prefecture, Japan
- Coordinates: 43°47′09″N 141°50′16″E
- Construction began: 1968
- Opening date: 1973

Dam and spillways
- Height: 17 m (56 ft)
- Length: 146.5 m (481 ft)

Reservoir
- Total capacity: 224 thousand cubic meters
- Catchment area: 1.2 sq. km
- Surface area: 7 hectares

Iwamura Dam (Japanese: 岩村ダム) is an earthfill dam located in Hokkaido Prefecture in Japan. The dam is used for irrigation. The catchment area of the dam is 1.2 km^{2}. The dam impounds about 7 ha of land when full and can store 224 thousand cubic meters of water. The construction of the dam was started on 1968 and completed in 1973.
