= Minoriga-ike Dam =

Dam in Gifu Prefecture, Japan

- Location within Japan
- Location: Gifu Prefecture, Japan
- Coordinates: 35°20′10″N 137°5′15″E
- Opening date: 1915

Dam and spillways
- Height: 15 m (49 ft)
- Length: 238 m (781 ft)

Reservoir
- Total capacity: 35 thousand cubic meters
- Catchment area: 0.5 sq. km
- Surface area: 4 hectares

Minoriga-ike Dam is an earthfill dam located in Gifu Prefecture in Japan. The dam is used for irrigation. The catchment area of the dam is 0.5 km^{2}. The dam impounds about 4 ha of land when full and can store 35 thousand cubic meters of water. The construction of the dam was completed in 1915.
