= Araizawa Tameike Dam =

Dam in Gifu Prefecture, Japan

- Location within Japan
- Interactive map of Araizawa Tameike Dam
- Location: Gifu Prefecture, Japan
- Coordinates: 35°26′57″N 137°27′27″E
- Opening date: 1952

Dam and spillways
- Height: 17 m (56 ft)
- Length: 93 m (305 ft)

Reservoir
- Total capacity: 60 thousand cubic meters
- Catchment area: 0.3 sq. km
- Surface area: 1 hectares

Araizawa Tameike Dam is an earthfill dam located in Gifu Prefecture in Japan. The dam is used for irrigation. The catchment area of the dam is 0.3 km^{2}. The dam impounds about 1 ha of land when full and can store 60 thousand cubic meters of water. The construction of the dam was completed in 1952.
