= Hiyoshi Bosai Dam =

Dam in Gifu Prefecture, Japan

- Location within Japan
- Interactive map of Hiyoshi Bosai Dam
- Location: Gifu Prefecture, Japan
- Coordinates: 35°25′17″N 137°15′41″E
- Construction began: 1972
- Opening date: 1976

Dam and spillways
- Height: 21 m (69 ft)
- Length: 160 m (520 ft)

Reservoir
- Total capacity: 317 thousand cubic meters
- Catchment area: 2.3 sq. km
- Surface area: 5 hectares

Hiyoshi Bosai Dam is an earthfill dam located in Gifu Prefecture in Japan. The dam is used for flood control. The catchment area of the dam is 2.3 km^{2}. The dam impounds about 5 ha of land when full and can store 317 thousand cubic meters of water. The construction of the dam was started on 1972 and completed in 1976.
