= Ushiroyama Tameike Dam =

Dam in Gifu Prefecture, Japan

- Location within Japan
- Location: Gifu Prefecture, Japan
- Coordinates: 35°32′34″N 137°28′12″E
- Opening date: 1951

Dam and spillways
- Height: 19.9 m (65 ft)
- Length: 261 m (856 ft)

Reservoir
- Total capacity: 410,000 m^{3} (14,000,000 cu ft)
- Catchment area: 2.1 km^{2} (0.81 sq mi)
- Surface area: 6 hectares (15 acres)

Ushiroyama Tameike Dam is an earthfill dam located in Gifu Prefecture in Japan. The dam is used for irrigation. The catchment area of the dam is 2.1 km^{2}. The dam impounds about 6 ha of land when full and can store 410 thousand cubic meters of water. The construction of the dam was started on and completed in 1951.
