= Hananoko Tameike Fukutei Dam =

Dam in Gifu Prefecture, Japan

- Location within Japan
- Interactive map of Hananoko Tameike Fukutei Dam
- Location: Gifu Prefecture, Japan
- Coordinates: 35°35′12″N 137°30′06″E
- Opening date: 1959

Dam and spillways
- Height: 15 m (49 ft)
- Length: 189 m (620 ft)

Reservoir
- Total capacity: 1025 thousand cubic meters
- Catchment area: 3.3 sq. km
- Surface area: 16 hectares

Hananoko Tameike Fukutei Dam is an earthfill dam located in Gifu Prefecture in Japan. The dam is used for irrigation. The catchment area of the dam is 3.3 km^{2}. The dam impounds about 16 ha of land when full and can store 1025 thousand cubic meters of water. The construction of the dam was completed in 1959.
