= Kaneyama Dam =

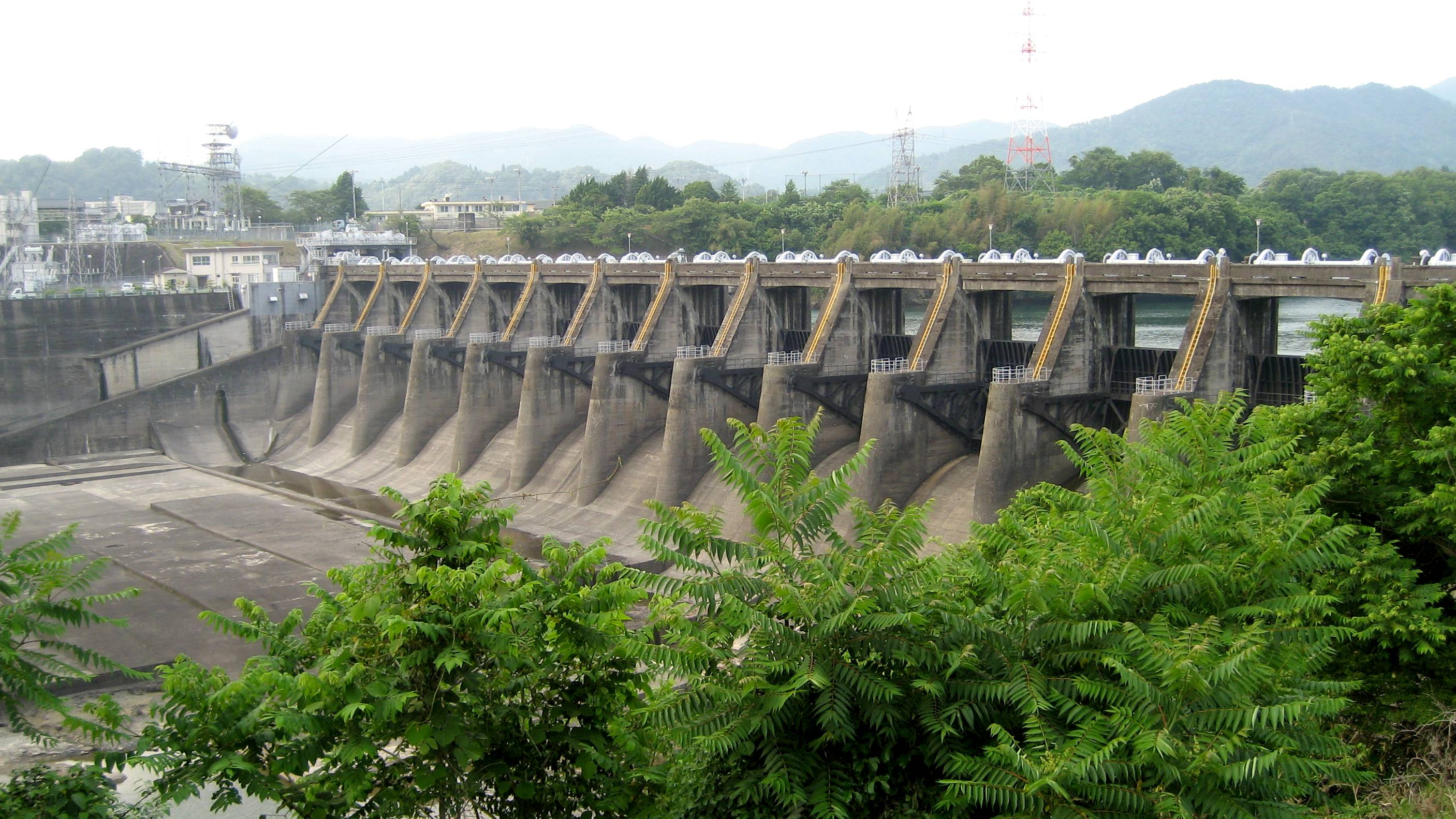
- Interactive map of Kaneyama Dam
- Location: Gifu Prefecture, Japan
- Coordinates: 35°27′53.8″N 137°06′12.5″E
- Construction began: 1939
- Opening date: 1943

Dam and spillways
- Impounds: Kiso River
- Height: 36.3 m
- Length: 205.7 m

Reservoir
- Total capacity: 9,392,000 m^{3}
- Catchment area: 2,452.0 km^{2}
- Surface area: 102 hectares

Kaneyama Dam (兼山ダム, Kaneyama damu) is a dam near Kani, in the Gifu Prefecture of Japan.
