= Ijira Tameike Dam =

Dam in Gifu Prefecture, Japan

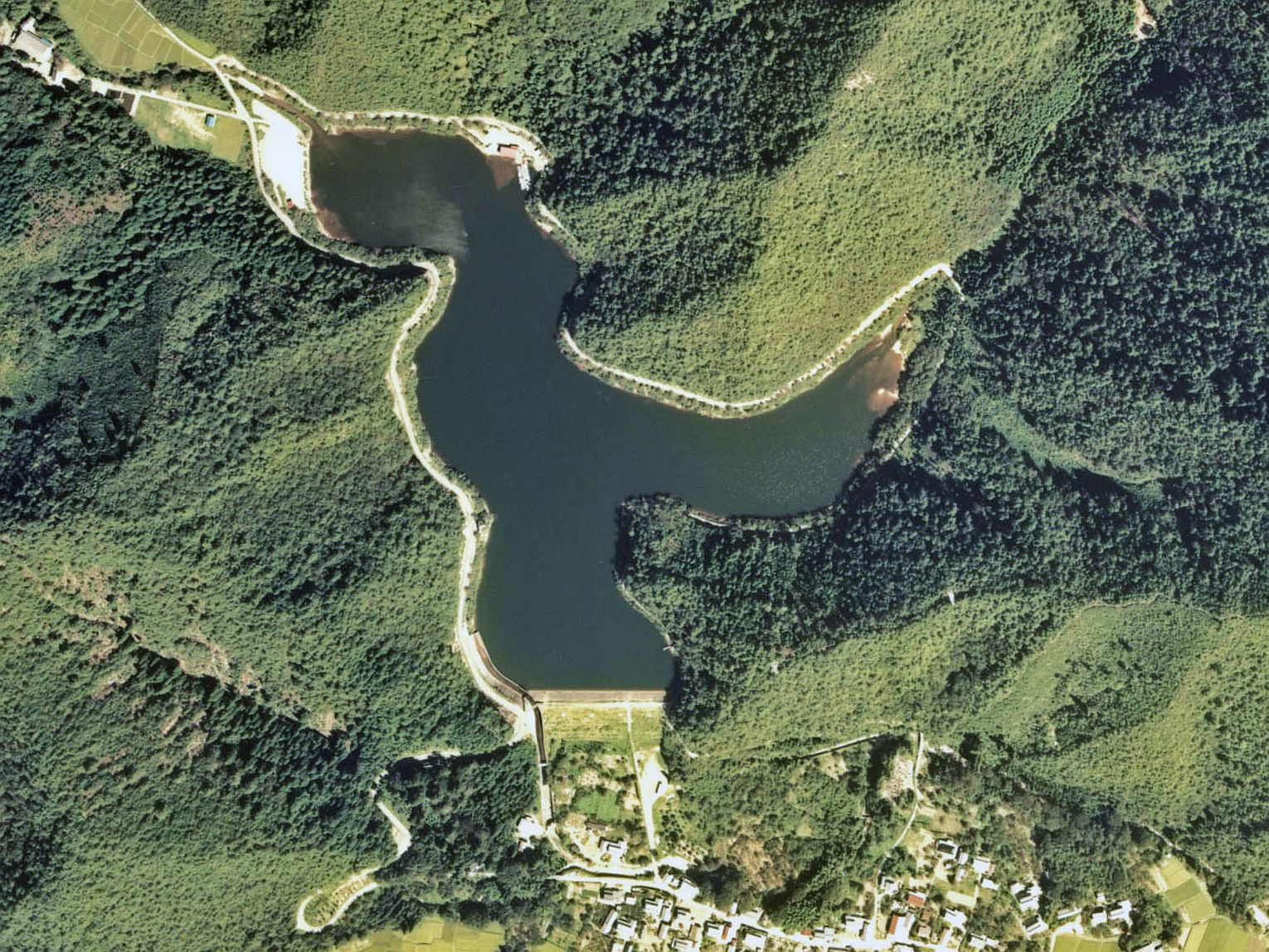

- Location within Japan
- Interactive map of Ijira Tameike Dam
- Location: Gifu Prefecture, Japan
- Coordinates: 35°33′45″N 136°42′11″E
- Construction began: 1958
- Opening date: 1966

Dam and spillways
- Height: 18 m (59 ft)
- Length: 126 m (413 ft)

Reservoir
- Total capacity: 540 thousand cubic meters
- Catchment area: 5.4 sq. km
- Surface area: 10 hectares

Ijira Tameike Dam is an earthfill dam located in Gifu Prefecture in Japan. The dam is used for irrigation. The catchment area of the dam is 5.4 km^{2}. The dam impounds about 10 ha of land when full and can store 540 thousand cubic meters of water. The construction of the dam was started on 1958 and completed in 1966.
