= Ohtani-ike Dam (Gifu) =

Dam in Gifu Prefecture, Japan

Ohtani-ike
- Location within Japan
- Location: Gifu Prefecture, Japan
- Coordinates: 35°21′26″N 136°30′49″E
- Opening date: 1914

Dam and spillways
- Height: 18.7 m (61 ft)
- Length: 82 m (269 ft)

Reservoir
- Total capacity: 161,000 m^{3} (5,700,000 cu ft)
- Catchment area: 1.2 km^{2} (0.46 sq mi)
- Surface area: 4 hectares (9.9 acres)

Ohtani-ike is an earthfill dam located in Gifu Prefecture in Japan. The dam is used for irrigation. The catchment area of the dam is 1.2 km^{2}. The dam impounds about 4 ha of land when full and can store 161 thousand cubic meters of water. The construction of the dam was completed in 1914.
