= Takane No.2 Dam =

Dam in Gifu Prefecture, Japan

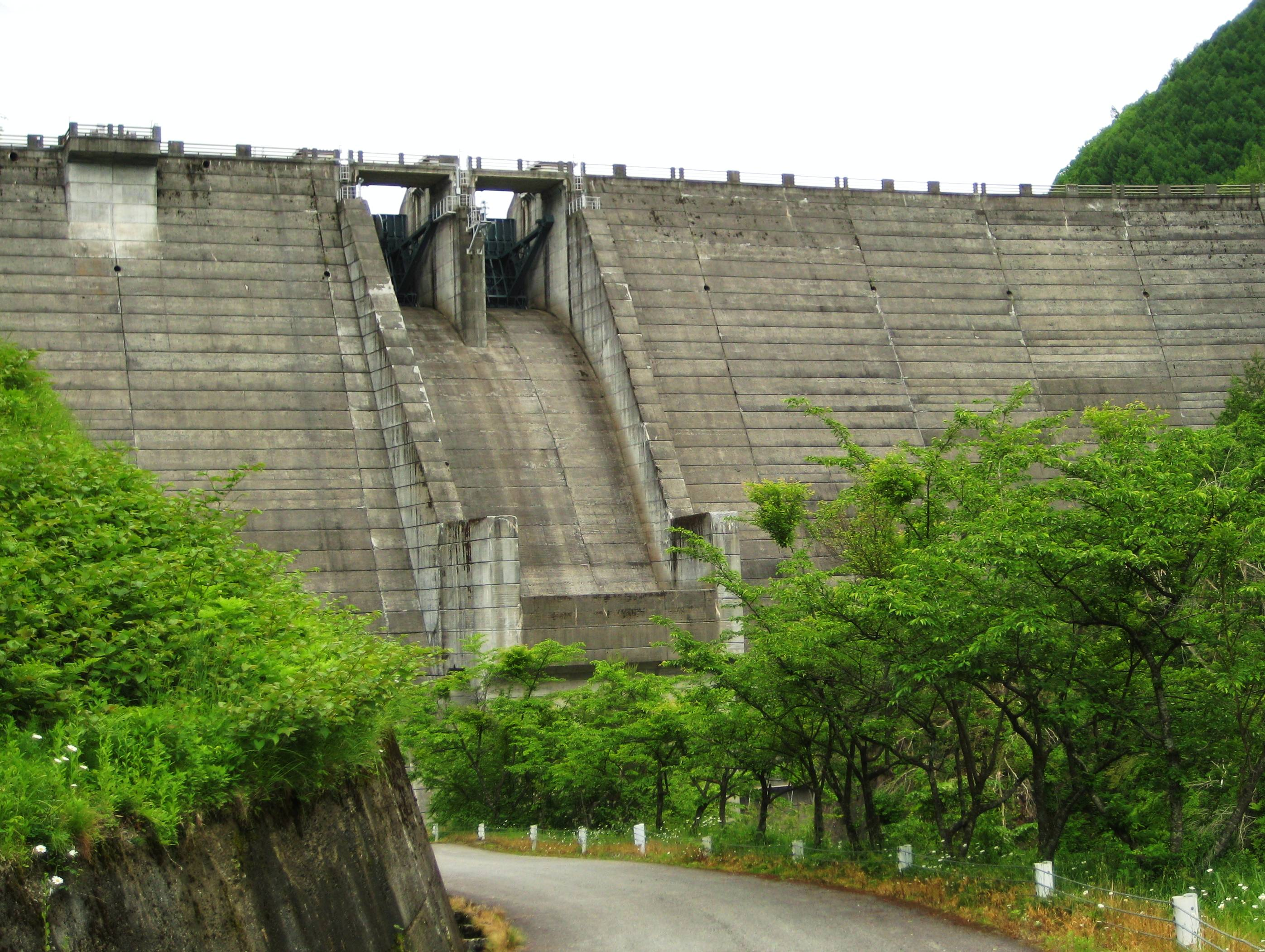

- Location within Japan
- Location: Gifu Prefecture, Japan
- Coordinates: 36°1′46″N 137°27′47″E
- Construction began: 1963
- Opening date: 1968

Dam and spillways
- Height: 69 m (226 ft)
- Length: 232 m (761 ft)

Reservoir
- Total capacity: 11,927,000 m^{3} (421,200,000 cu ft)
- Catchment area: 173 km^{2} (67 sq mi)
- Surface area: 58 hectares (140 acres)

Takane No.2 Dam is a hollow gravity dam located in Gifu Prefecture in Japan. The dam is used for power production. The catchment area of the dam is 173 km^{2}. The dam impounds about 58 ha of land when full and can store 11927 thousand cubic meters of water. The construction of the dam was started on 1963 and completed in 1968.
