= Yokoyama Dam =

Dam in Gifu Prefecture, Japan

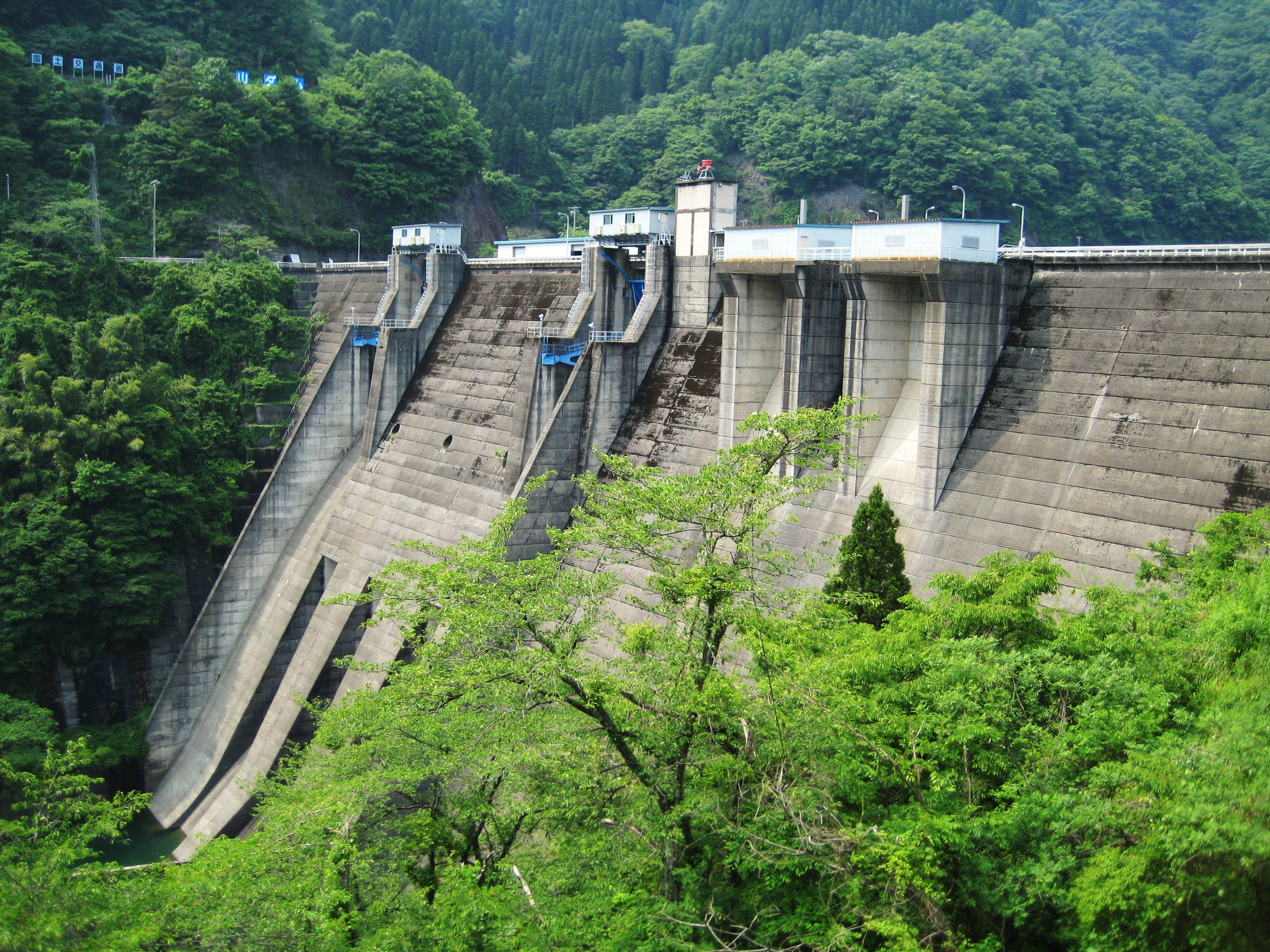
- Location: Ibigawa, Gifu Prefecture, Japan.
- Coordinates: 35°35′35″N 136°27′19″E
- Construction began: 1957
- Opening date: 1964

Dam and spillways
- Impounds: Ibi River
- Height: 80.8 m
- Length: 220.0 m

Reservoir
- Total capacity: 43,000,000 m^{3}
- Catchment area: 471.0 km^{2}
- Surface area: 170 hectares

Yokoyama Dam (横山ダム, Yokoyama damu) is a dam in Ibigawa, in the Gifu Prefecture of Japan.

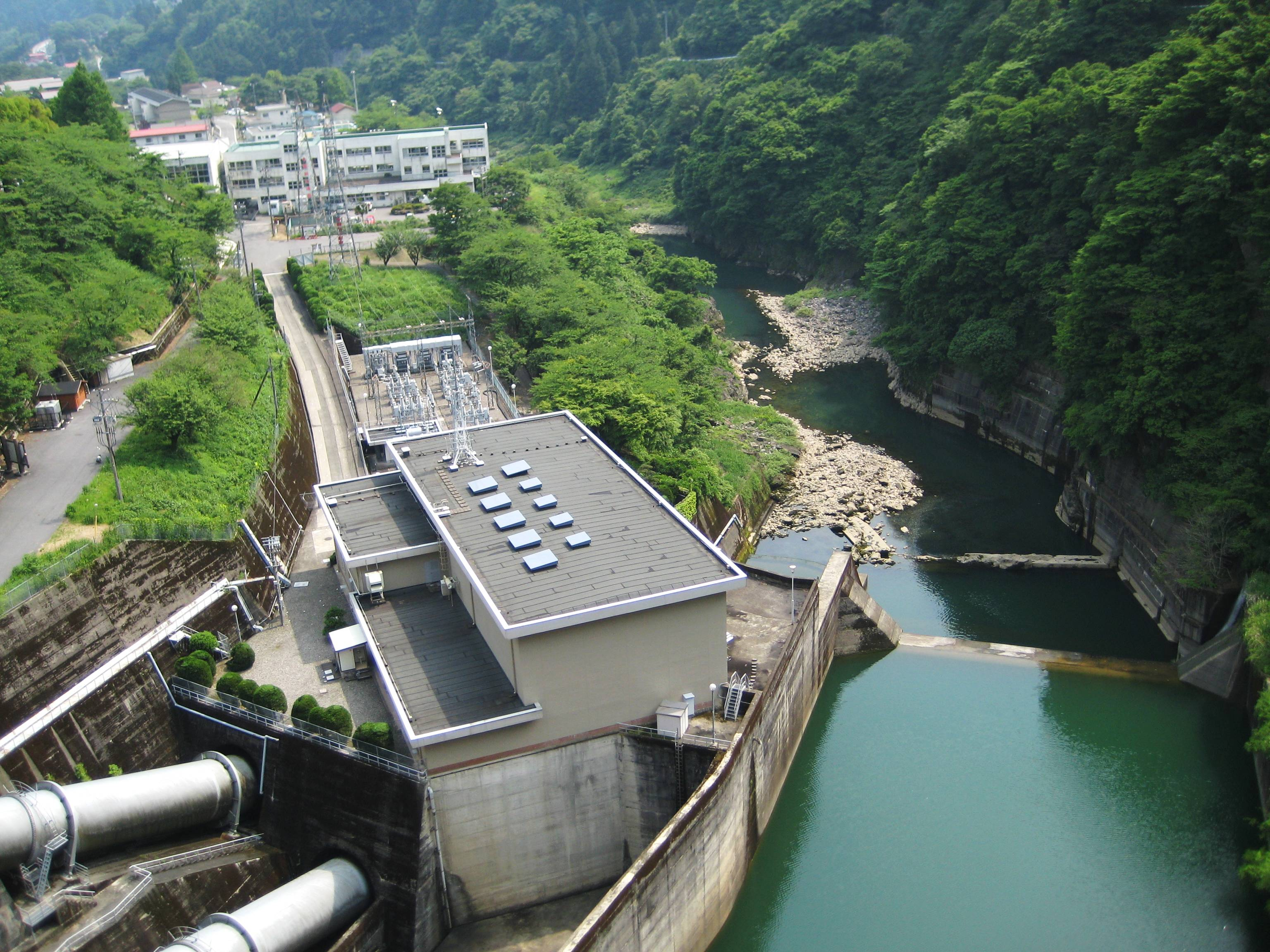
