= Asahi Dam (Gifu) =

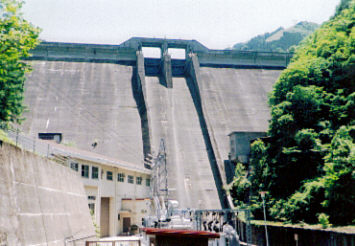
- Interactive map of Asahi Dam
- Official name: 朝日ダム
- Location: Gifu Prefecture, Japan
- Coordinates: 36°04′35″N 137°24′44″E
- Construction began: 1946
- Opening date: 1953

Dam and spillways
- Type of dam: Gravity dam
- Impounds: Hida River
- Height: 87.0 m
- Length: 189.5 m

Reservoir
- Total capacity: 25,513,000 m^{3}
- Catchment area: 225.0 km^{2}
- Surface area: 98.0 hectares

Power Station
- Installed capacity: 20.5 MW

Asahi Dam (朝日ダム) is a dam built on the class 1 Hida River (part of the Kiso River water system), located in the city of Takayama, Gifu Prefecture, Japan.

The large-scale hydroelectricity-generating dam is managed directly by Chubu Electric Power, Co., and was built as part of the first step of a consistent development plan for the Hida River basin. It is an 87.0-meter-tall concrete gravity dam, and the first high dam on the Hida River. Akigami Dam on the Akigami River was constructed at the same time; they both create water reservoirs which, when used effectively, allow for stable, fortified hydroelectric power via generation stations at the downstream Hida River area, even in times of drought. The artificial lake created by Asahi Dam is Asahi Reservoir.

== History ==
=== Until project completion ===
A large part of the Hida River basin consists of tight gorges formed by the Nakayama Shichiri Valley and the Hisui Ravine, which increase the speed of the water flow; the area also overlaps with the Hida and the rainy Kiso mountain ranges, providing the area with an abundance of water. This makes hydroelectricity production on the river advantageous, and during the Taishō period in the early 20th century, plans for hydroelectricity generation were lauded as part of the driving forces behind the country's wealth and prosperity.

Two electric companies were working simultaneously on the Hida River: In 1919, electric companies in the Kansai region merged to create the Nihon Denryoku power company, and work began on hydroelectricity generation along the upstream Hida River; three years later in 1922, the Gifu Electric power company and other power companies in the Tōkai region merged into Tōhō Electric under the leadership of Matsunaga Yasuzaemon, and began hydroelectricity production on the Hida River's midstream and downstream areas. The two companies continued development in the region along the same river, taking care to avoid interfering with each other's plans, and proceeding to build hydroelectricity generation plants at Seto, Nagura, Hichisou and Kami-asō, as well as Kami-asō Dam, Ōfunato Dam, Shimohara Dam and Nishimura Dam.

However, entering the Shōwa period and following the Manchurian Incident, Professor Mononobe Nagaho of Tokyo Imperial University leveraged his concurrent position as public works testing lab manager for the Home Ministry to forward the "Comprehensive River Development Project", which put the government in direct control of planning for flood prevention and water utilization, a move thought beneficial during wartime and approved by the military, bureaucrats and those at the Ministry of Post and Telecommunications. In response, in 1939 the 73rd Imperial Diet passed the Energy Management Act and the Japan Electric Generation and Transmission Company Act, and that same year the Electricity Authority (founded as a management authority) and Japan Electric Generation and Transmission Company (a trust) were born. All hydroelectricity generation operations on the Hida River, current and under-construction, were absorbed by Japan Electric Generation and Transmission Company.

That same year, the 1939 Long-term Electric Project called for 1.8 million kW of hydroelectric power generation for the nation, and to meet that goal, construction plans were formed for several large-scale hydroelectricity generation plants across the country. The Kiso River water system saw plans for Miura Dam on the Ōtakigawa River and Maruyama Dam on the Kiso River; the Hida River was eyed for the construction of a large-scale dam/hydroelectricity generation plant in Ōno District's Asahi Village (now part of Takayama City, in Gifu Prefecture) at Teradzuki. This laid the groundwork for the creation of Asahi Dam, and surveying began in 1942. However, the state of the Pacific War continued to deteriorate for Japan, and in 1944, war crisis-aversion guidelines called for all available materials and resources to go toward the war effort; construction plans for Asahi Dam were therefore forcefully postponed.

=== Continuation under Chubu Electric Power ===
After Japan's defeat in the Pacific War, the country's electric facilities were operating at only 60% of their normal output due to accidents related to overuse and damage from air raids; at the same time, home electricity usage—which had been under restriction due to the war—rapidly increased and outpaced supply. The result was a massive shortage of electricity. The administration in charge of electricity administration at the time—the Electricity Department of the Ministry of Commerce and Industry took to pouring a large amount of effort into spurring hydroelectricity production in the hopes of alleviating the crisis. Japan Electric Generation and Transmission Company recommenced its survey of Asahi Dam in January 1946, and in July 1949, gained permission from the Supreme Commander of the Allied Powers (the GHQ, General Headquarters) to begin full-scale construction.

However, while plans for Asahi Dam moved forward, Japan Electric Generation and Transmission Company was being scrutinized by the GHQ for "monopolistic capital" violations under the Economic Decentralization Act, and in 1948 was singled out under that legislation. The government and Japan Electric Generation and Transmission Company protested, arguing that Japan Electric Generation and Transmission Company should maintain its current structure. The GHQ disagreed, insisting on the breakup of the company and pressing the government to adopt what the electric industry reorganization committee at the time put forth as the "nine-area partition plan". That plan was drawn up by Matsunaga Yasuzaemon, former head of Tōhō Electric and a figure deeply involved in the expansion of electricity generation along the Hida River.

Development of Asahi Dam was put on hold until the disagreement with the GHQ could be reconciled, and until the nine-area partition plan was put into effect, the GHQ refused to permit any other activities by Japan Electric Generation and Transmission Company. The government's plans for early-stage promotion of electric power development were jeopardized, and bowing to pressure, drafted the Electric Industry Reorganization Order, going public with it in January 1951. Japan Electric Generation and Transmission Company would be split up into nine different privatized electric companies nationwide. Along the Kiso River water system, Kansai Electric Power Co., Inc. assumed control of Daidō Electric Power Co.’s old territories, while Chūbu Electric Power took those of Tōhō Electric; both companies vied contentiously over water rights. Government arbitration became necessary, and it was decided that the previous Nihon Denryoku power company’s hydroelectricity generation facilities along the Hida River would all go to Chubu Electric Power, also giving them all water rights along the Hida River.

Chūbu Electric Power followed up with a project for the entire Hida River basin, dubbed the "Integrated Watershed Development Plan". The Hida River's main river and tributaries would see the development of multiple hydroelectricity-generation dams as the company followed through with plans to maximize the usage of water power resources in the area. Asahi Dam and Akigami Dam were designated as the first part of that project, and the company proceeded with construction preparations.

== Compensation ==
At the time construction began on Asahi Dam, there were no special compensation plans for affected residents—like the Act on Special Measures concerning Measures Related to Water Resources Areas, or the Three Power Source Development Laws that exist today—and any compensation plans were largely dependent on businesses negotiating individual contracts with the government. Asahi Dam and Akigami Dam were bundled together as one project, and construction couldn't start until compensation negotiations for both the Hida River basin and the Akigami River basin were finalized. Asahi Dam was originally designed to be 72 meters tall, but in 1951 that figure was revised to 87 meters; in Ōno District's Takane Village (now part of Takayama City), an additional 33 residences would be submerged as a result of the height increase, which drew unanimous protests from residents there. Land brokers also raised the prices on all the affected land.

Negotiations that began in August 1948 continued until the dam was almost completed in autumn of 1953, and during those 5 years, Chūbu Electric Power set standard compensation values for each residence based on valuations from fixed-asset taxes, and used those valuations as the basis for negotiations. Concurrently, compensation was paid to farmers in Takane Village, known for its warabi (bracken) powder production. Negotiations were completed with all residents, also owing largely to movement allowance programs under which residents received land and housing of roughly equal value to what they would lose. Compensation, movement allowances and land purchases were also approved for those whose houses would not be submerged, but whose livelihoods would nevertheless be adversely affected by the creation of the dam.

Residents of the affected areas, including those in certain areas of Takayama City, Kiyomi Village (currently part of Takayama City) in Ōno District, Kō City (currently part of Hida City) in Yoshiki District, Takasu Village (currently part of Gujō City) in Gujō District and Hirukawa Village (currently part of Ena City) in Ena District all left the area. Residents thus gave up their homes for the continuation of the Hida River Integrated Watershed Development Plan.

== Purpose ==
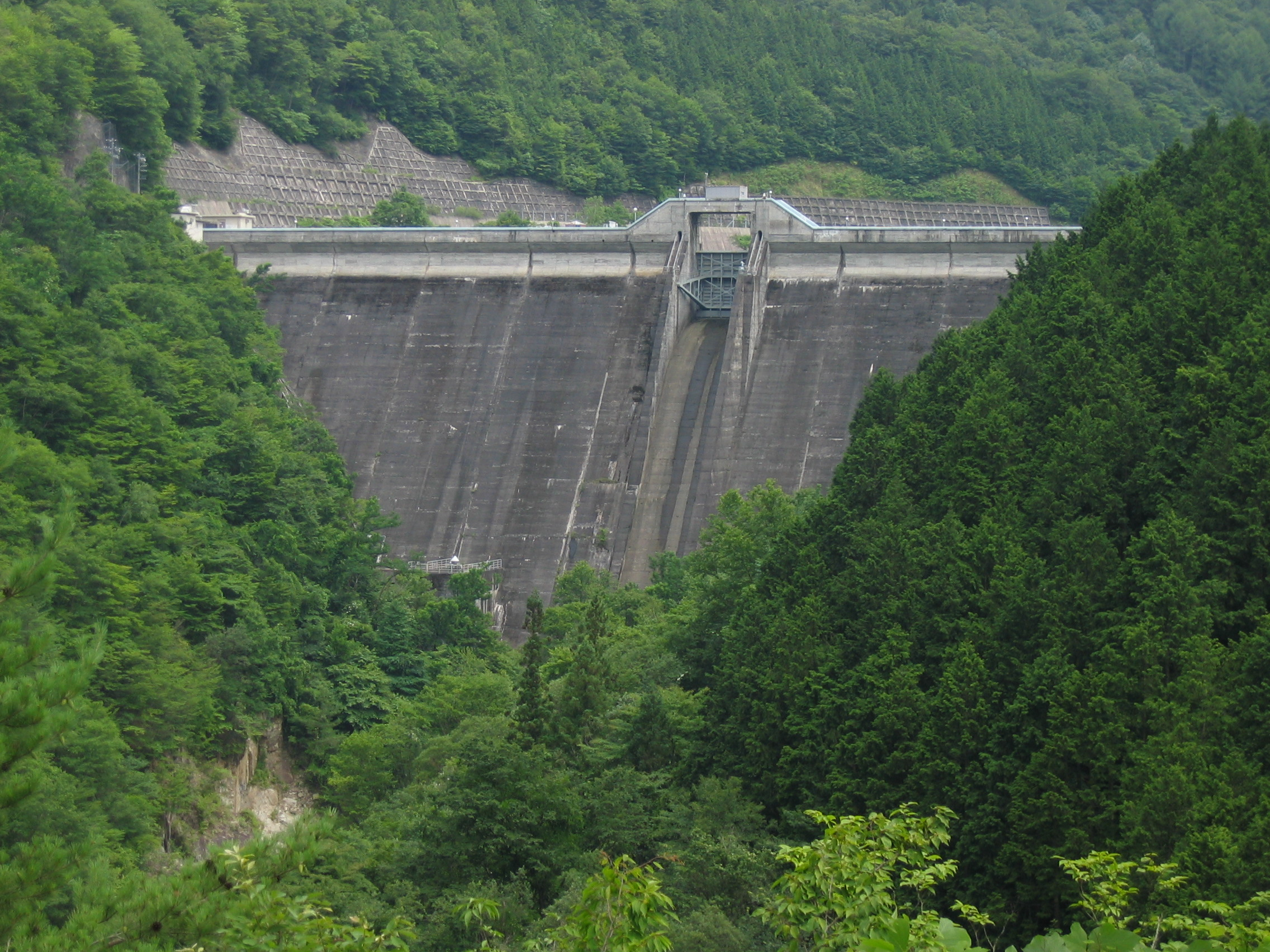
Akigami Dam, (Akigami River). Hydroelectricity generation capacity was increased by increasing the amount of water storage along the Hida River's lower reaches.

After work had begun on Asahi Dam, the governmental cabinet-level Economic Stabilization Board came up with the Kiso Regional Comprehensive Development Plan and the Kiso River Drainage Basin Planning Program, which called for changes in Asahi Dam's planned purpose. At the time, Japan's rivers had been poorly maintained due to factors like deforestation and the diversion of resources for the war, and the yearly water damage that Japan sustained along with shortages in food and electricity were combining to prohibit economic recovery. In 1949, the Economic Stabilization Board came up with flood control and flood regulation plans to increase safety along the Kiso River water system, based on the "River Improvement Plan". After the passage of the 1950 Comprehensive National Land Development Act, they followed up with the Kiso Regional Comprehensive Development Plan, which was focused on flood prevention, agricultural irrigation and hydroelectricity generation.

The plans called for giving priority to "multi-purpose dams" along the Kiso River, Nagara River, Ibi River and Hida River. The construction plans for Maruyama Dam along the Kiso River that Kansai Electric Power Co., Inc. had taken over after the breakup of Japan Electric Generation and Transmission Company were thus altered to make it a multi-purpose dam, ordered by the Ministry of Construction's Chūbu Regional Development Bureau (now the Ministry of Land, Infrastructure, Transport and Tourism). Likewise, Chūbu Electric Power's construction plans for Asahi Dam were altered on recommendation from the Ministry of Construction's Chūbu Regional Development Bureau to create a multi-purpose dam. Updated plans raised height of the dam to 92.0 meters, increased the gross reservoir capacity by more than 9 million tons to 34,400,000 tons, and also lowered the electrical generation capabilities to 19,000 kilowatts, reapportioning some storage water for flood control and irrigation along the Nōbi Plain.

However, this plan did not factor in Akigami Dam, and ran counter to the underlying idea of the Hida River Integrated Watershed Development Plan. Plans were once again redrawn, abandoning the multi-purposing of Asahi Dam and reverting to original plans of building the dam solely for hydroelectricity generation. In December 1953, Asahi Dam and Akigami Dam were completed, and Asahi Power Plant began operation. Ten years had passed since the plan's inception, and seven years since the plan was announced. The average temperature during the winter in the area at which the dam is located is −10 °C, which among other things made laying concrete difficult; 27 workers died due to work-related injuries during construction of the dam. This made Asahi Dam the deadliest of all the projects under the Hida River Integrated Watershed Development Plan. A 16-kilometer large-scale cable ropeway constructed to transport supplies to the construction site was reused by Hokuriku Electric Power Company in the construction of Arimine Dam on the Wada River (along the Jyōganji River water system) in Toyama City, Toyama Prefecture, and again reused by Tokyo Electric Power Company, Inc. in the construction of Nagawado Dam on the Sai River in Matsumoto City, Nagano Prefecture.

Asahi Dam normally generates 6,700 kilowatts, up to a maximum of 20,500 kilowatts, via the downstream Asahi Power Plant. Asahi Dam's water storage and the Akigami Dam reservoir work in concert so that during the dry summer and winter seasons a stable supply of water is sent downstream to other hydroelectricity generation plants, generating 119,420,000 kWh per year. Asahi Dam's primary purpose is hydroelectricity generation, and the water that goes through it normally is not used for agricultural irrigation or tap water, but it is used at times to meet water requirements in the Tōkai area, which sees frequent droughts. From May to June 1967 during a drought termed a "rainless rainy season", Chūbu Electric Power—receiving a request from the Ministry of Construction—worked with Kansai Electric Power Co., Inc. to divert water from Asahi Dam and other dams and discharge dam water as an emergency measure for providing agricultural irrigation and tap water. Naturally, this lowers the electricity output of the dam, and is normally not done. As a more recent example of this kind of reapportioning, in 2005, drought conditions along the Yoshino River lowered water supply in Shikoku and emptied Sameura Dam, leading Shikoku Electric Power Co., Inc. to take similar measures.

== Asahi Dam’s turbid water problems ==
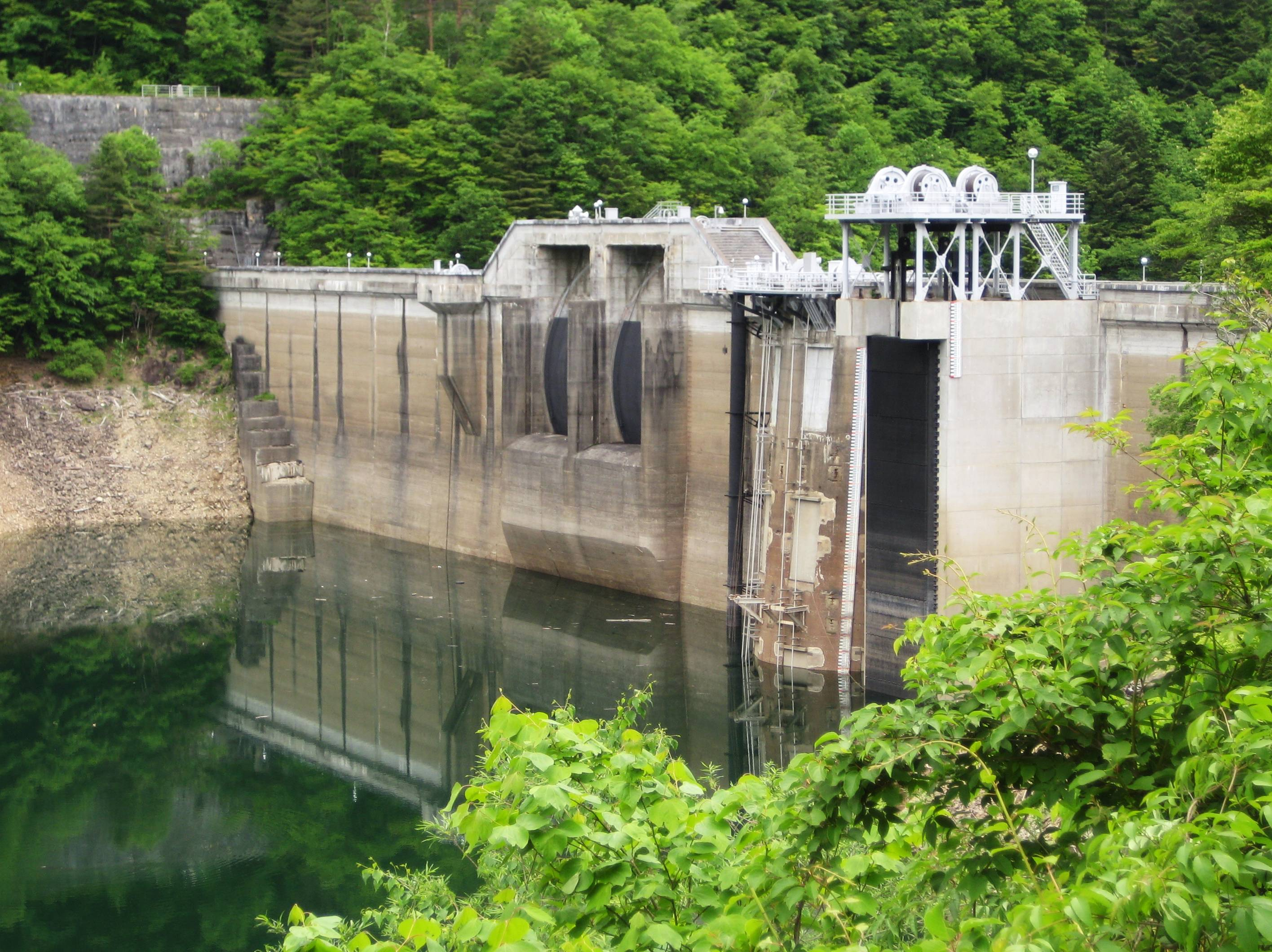
Asahi Dam water intake facility

Issues between the construction and administration of Asahi Dam and the local fishing industry were unavoidable. When construction began, the Mashita River Japan Fisheries Cooperative held fishing rights along part of the Hida River, which was previously known as Mashita River upward from the point (Gero City in Kanayama) where it combines with the Maze River. In 1964, under the River Act, the river was renamed the Hida River in all territories that it flows through, which deprived the Japan Fisheries Cooperative of some of its fishing rights. The cooperative was fiercely opposed to the change. They eventually settled for a combination of 12,880,000 yen and the coverage of fees for the construction of a trout breeding facility.

In July 1965, heavy rainfall caused the Hida River water level to rise, and water discharged from Asahi Dam caused long-term water turbidity along the Hida River, heavily affecting the fishing industry. The construction of Takane Dam #1 at the highest reaches of the Hida River, combined with the presence of Asahi Dam, created major problems for and drew the opposition of the Mashita River Japan Fisheries Cooperative. Demanding a quick fix to the turbidity problem, they took a hardline-stance by withdrawing all support for future hydroelectricity generation projects along the Hida River. Following the Hida River bus accident of 1967 (in which two buses fell into the river, killing 104), the turbidity of the river made search and rescue operations difficult; the Mashita River Japan Fisheries Cooperative pointed to Asahi Dam as one of the causes of the turbidity, raising the issue with mass media and creating more social awareness of it.

Chūbu Electric Power resorted to building a surface water intake facility at Asahi Reservoir. The facility selectively takes in water from the relatively clear water at the upper layer of the reservoir, and by discharging it, lowers the turbidity of the water downstream; such facilities are used at many dam lakes. This response brought the fishing cooperative back to the negotiation tables, but issues of compensation went unresolved, leading the fishing cooperative to first take legal measures to block the production of concrete aggregate used in the construction of the dam, and then declare their intention to use force to block further construction of Takane Dam#1.

In reaction to the fishing cooperative's declarations, Gifu Prefecture stepped in as mediator between the cooperative and Chubu Electric Power, eventually securing a 4,000,000 yen "Asahi Dam Turbidity Compensation" payment that would be added to the original compensation package paid to the cooperative for the construction of Takane Dam#1, bringing the issue to a close.

== Access ==
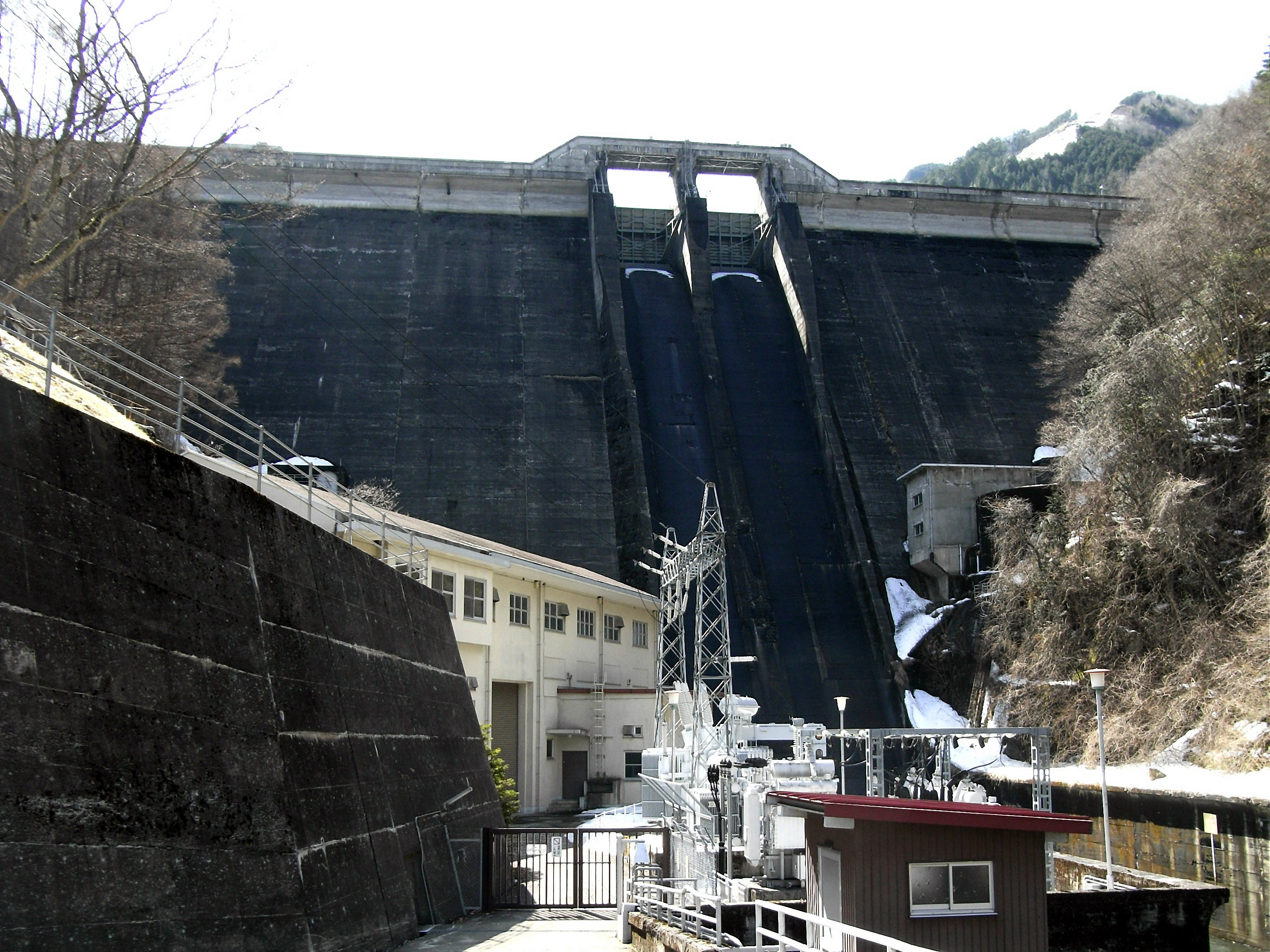
Asahi Dam

Asahi Dam can be accessed from Nagoya or the city of Gifu by exiting the Tōkai-Hokuriku Expressway at the Hida-Kiyomi Interchange and traveling along Route 158 to Takayama City, proceeding to Route 41 toward Gero Hot Springs, going through the center of the former town of Kuguno to enter Route 361 (the Kiso Highway) and going straight. After passing the Hida-Asahi Village roadside station, transfer to the road along the Hida River from the national highway at Asai in the town of Kuguno, and after passing Kuguno Dam, Asahi Dam can be seen on the right after entering Teradzuki. Continue along that road to reach the Asahi Dam management office. The road to the dam's electricity generation plant is also along this route, but it is closed to the public.

Previously, a road along Asahi Dam was accessible from Route 361, but rockslides and other dangerous bottlenecks along the road led to the creation of the Akigami Bypass along Akigami Dam, which can be used to access Takane, the town of Kisofukushima, the Nomugi Pass and Matsumoto City. However, Asahi Dam itself is not accessible from the bypass that straddles the reservoir. Several other dams are located around Asahi Dam, including Akigami Dam, Takane Dam#1, Takane Dam#2, and Kuguno Dam.
