= Asahi Dam =

Asahi Dam may refer to the following dams in Japan, by prefecture:

- Asahi Dam (Fukushima)
- Asahi Dam (Gifu)
- Asahi Dam (Nara)
