= Mazegawa Dam =

Dam in Gifu Prefecture, Japan

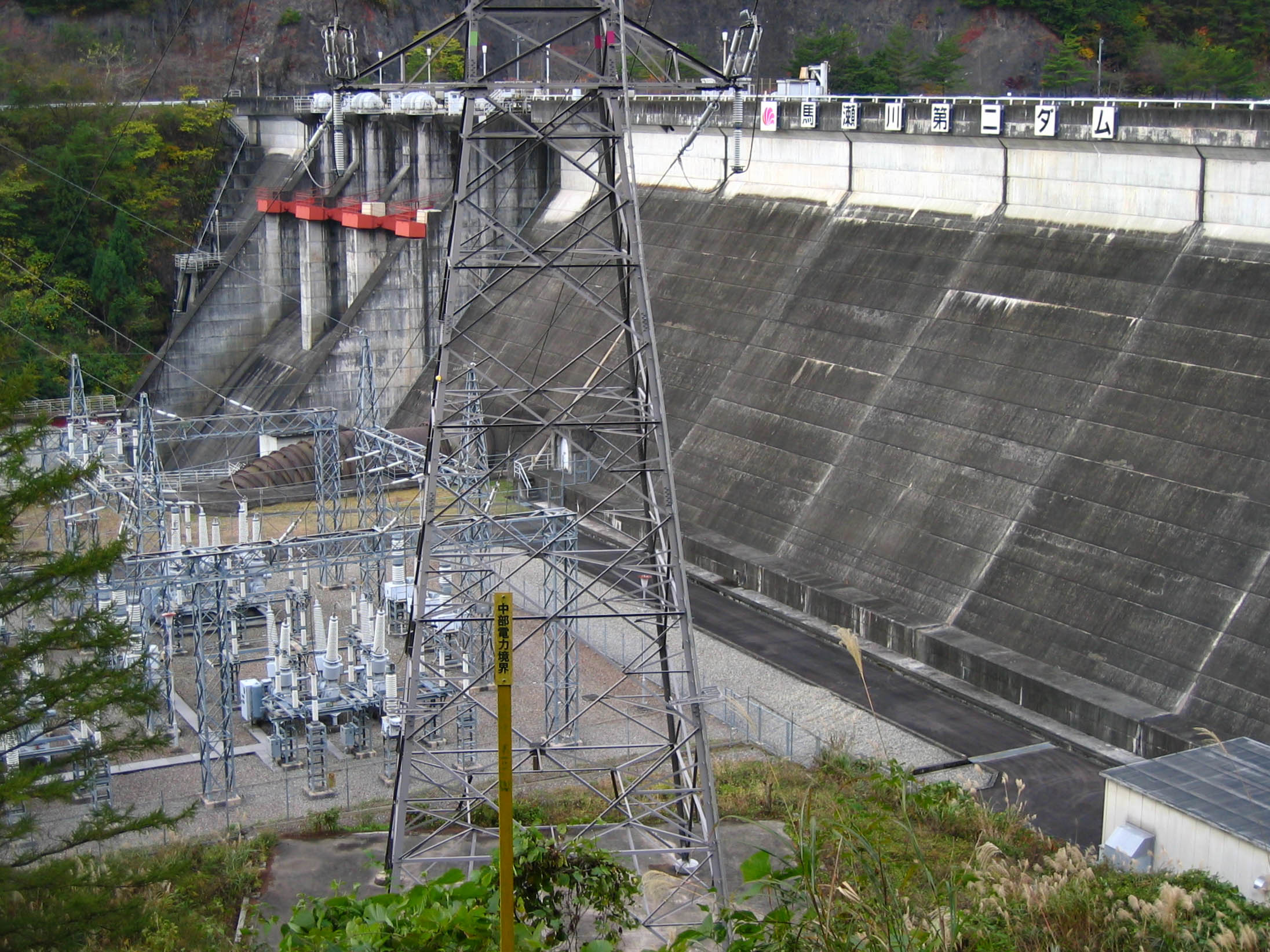
- Interactive map of Mazegawa Dam
- Official name: 馬瀬川第二ダム
- Location: Gero, Gifu Prefecture, Japan.
- Coordinates: 35°43′53″N 137°08′25″E
- Construction began: 1966
- Opening date: 1976

Dam and spillways
- Impounds: Maze River
- Height: 44.5 meters
- Length: 263.0 meters

Reservoir
- Total capacity: 9,736,000 m^{3}
- Catchment area: 1,049.0 km^{2}
- Surface area: 70 hectares

Power Station
- Installed capacity: 28.8 MW

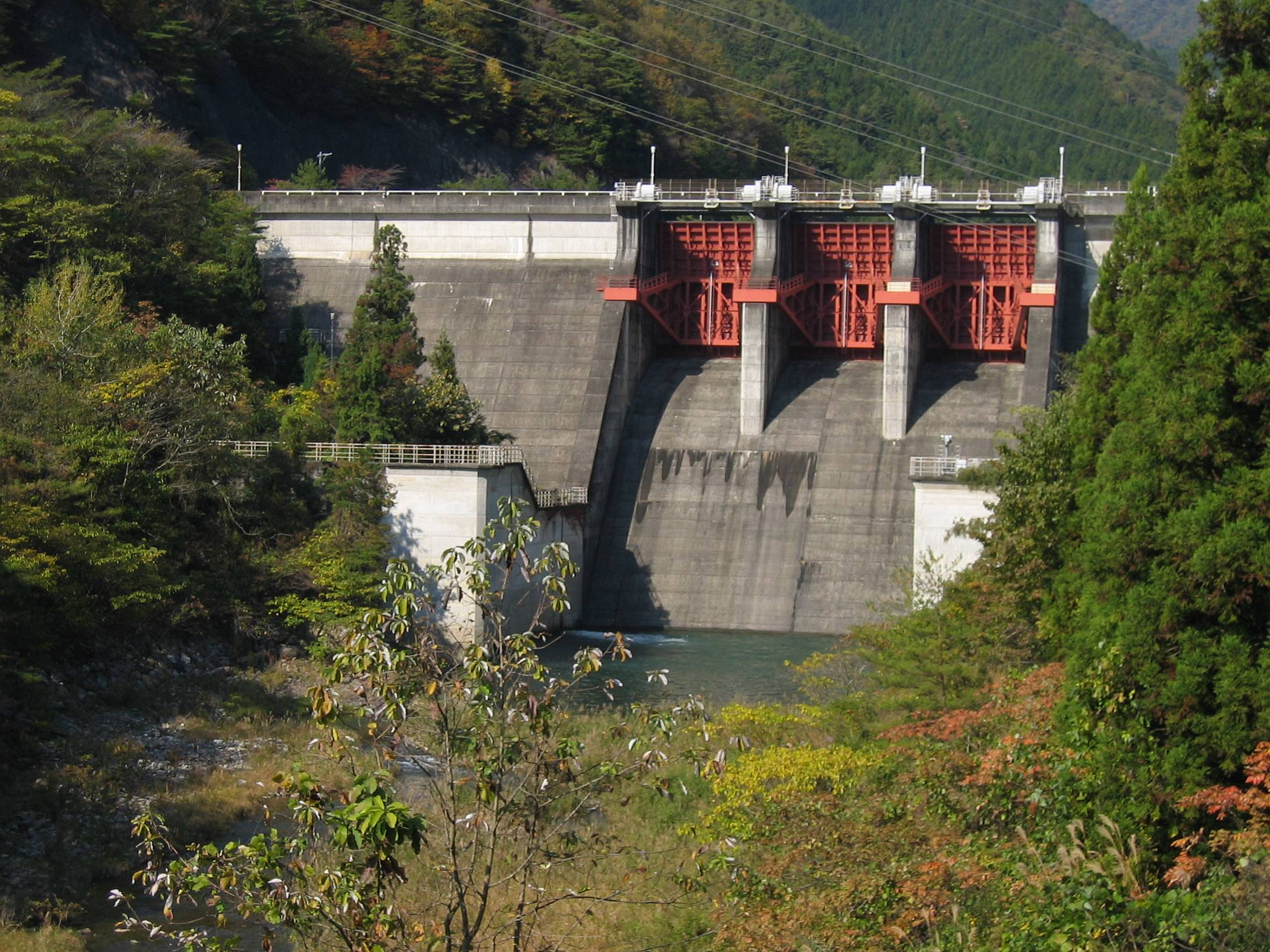

Mazegawa No.2 Dam (馬瀬川第二ダム, Mazegawa dai-ni da-mu) is a dam in the city of Gero in Gifu Prefecture, Japan on the Maze River. The dam is part of the Iwaya Dam project which acts as a flood control across the wider Kiso River system. The dam is a concrete gravity dam with a height of 44.5 meters. It was constructed for hydroelectric power generation and its associated power plant has a capacity of 288,000 kilowatts of power. It is managed by the Chubu Electric Power Company.
