= Shimohara Dam =

Dam in Gero, Gifu Prefecture, Japan

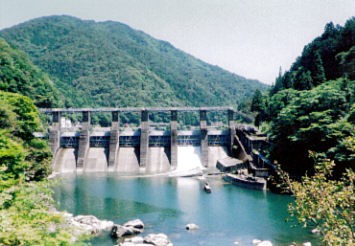
- Interactive map of Shimohara Dam
- Official name: 下原ダム
- Location: Gero, Gufu, Japan.
- Coordinates: 35°42′25″N 137°10′57″E
- Construction began: 1933
- Opening date: 1938

Dam and spillways
- Impounds: Hida River
- Height: 23 meters
- Length: 102.5 meters

Reservoir
- Total capacity: 2,936,000 m^{3}
- Catchment area: 1,147.0 km^{2}
- Surface area: 35 hectares

Power Station
- Installed capacity: 22.0 MW

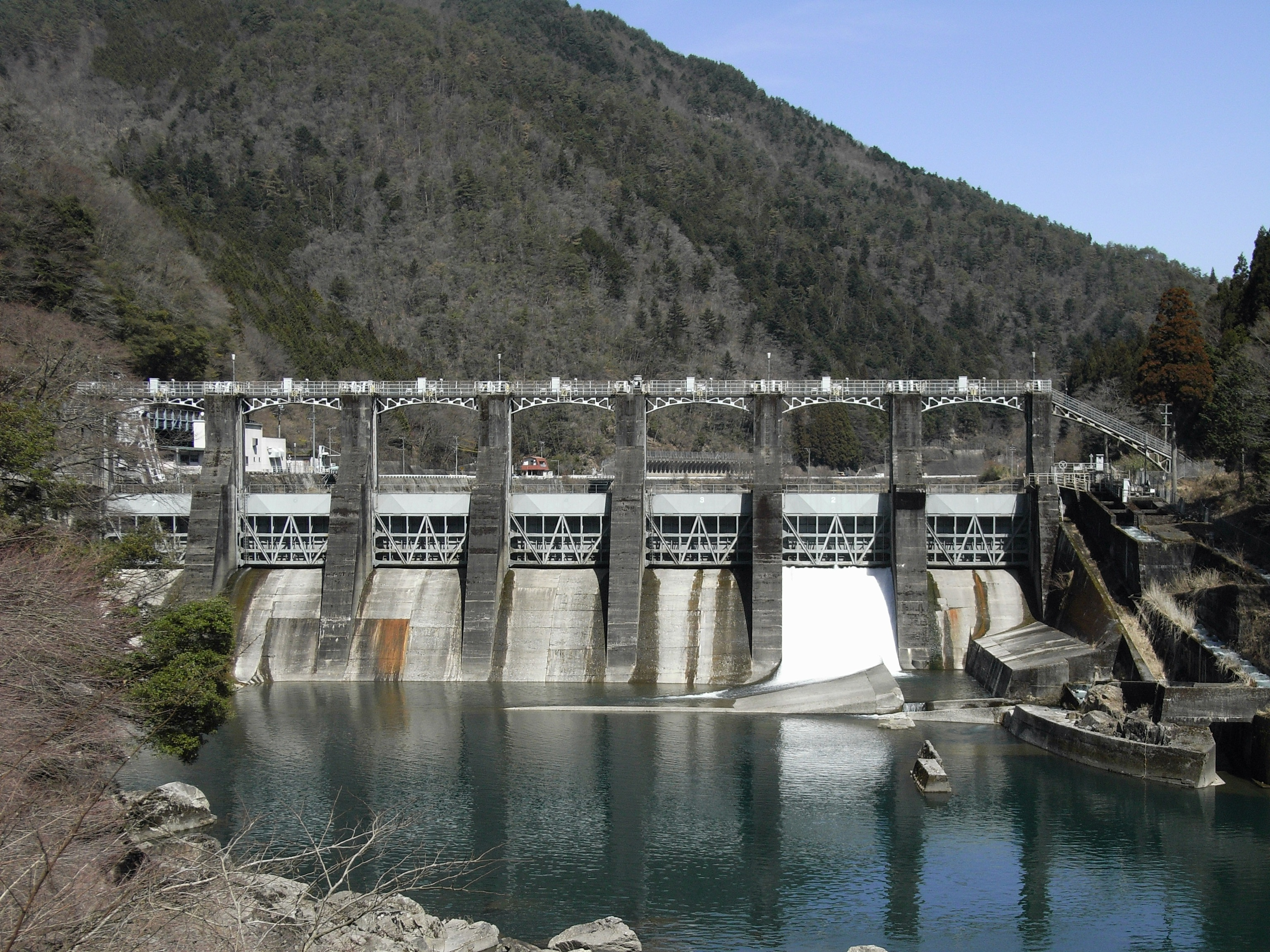

Shimohara Dam (下原ダム, Shimohara damu) is a dam in the city of Gero, Gifu Prefecture, Japan on the middle reaches of the Hida River, which is part of the Kiso River system.

== Features ==
The dam is a concrete gravity dam with a height of 23.0 meters.

The dam was constructed exclusively for hydroelectric power generation and generates a maximum of 22,000 kilowatts at the Shimohara Power Station downstream of the dam.

== History ==
The dam was completed in 1938 by the Toho Electric Power Company as part of the pre-war Hida River Development Project and was taken over by the Chubu Electric Power Company from 1951.

== Location ==
The dam is located with the borders of the Hida-Kisogawa Quasi-National Park.
