= Takane Dam =

Dam in Gifu Prefecture, Japan

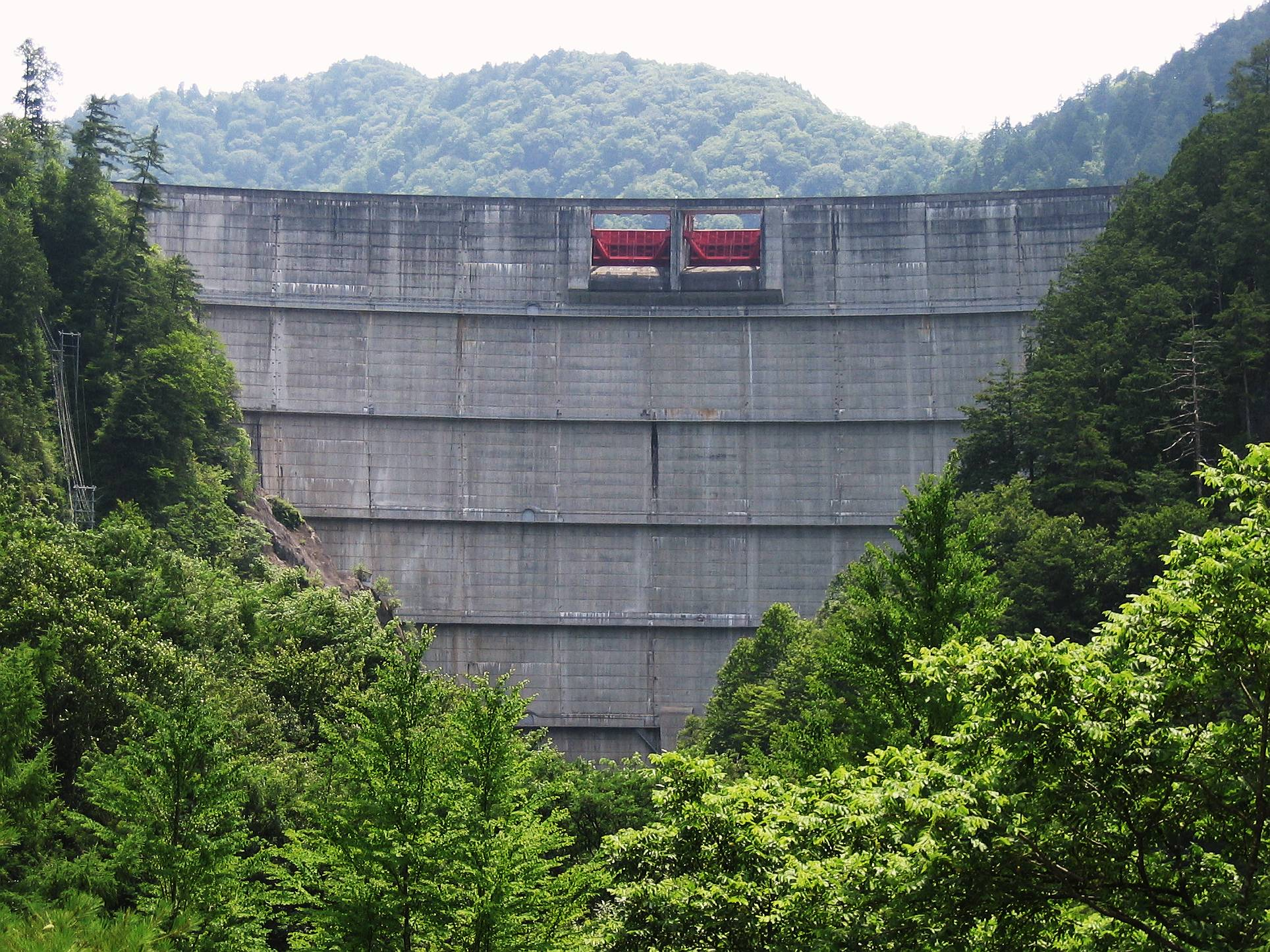
- Interactive map of Takane Dam
- Official name: 高根第一ダム
- Location: Takayama, Gifu Prefecture, Japan.
- Coordinates: 36.0320°N 137.4931°E
- Construction began: 1963
- Opening date: 1969

Dam and spillways
- Impounds: Hida River
- Height: 133 m
- Length: 276.4 m

Reservoir
- Creates: Lake Takane-Norikura
- Total capacity: 34,013,000 m^{3}
- Catchment area: 159.8 km^{2}
- Surface area: 117 hectares

Power Station
- Installed capacity: 340 MW

Takane No.1 Dam (高根第一ダム, Takane Dai-ichi da-mu) is a concrete arch dam in the city of Takayama, in the Gifu Prefecture of Japan. It supports a 340 MW hydroelectric power station.

== Dam ==
The dam is located in the upstream region of the Hida River, which is part of the Kiso River system. The dam was constructed exclusively for hydroelectric power generation and is managed by the Chubu Electric Power Company. It is the highest dam on the Hida River, with a height of 133 meters.

The reservoir created by the dam also serves as pumped storage facility for the Takane Daiichi Power Station, and with a lower adjustment reservoir directly downstream created by the Takane No.2 Dam, forms the largest hydropower station in the Hida River basin with a maximum of 340,000 kilowatts of power generation.

== History ==
69 houses were flooded by the construction of the dam
