= Kamiasō Dam =

Coordinates: 35.5635°N 137.1851°E

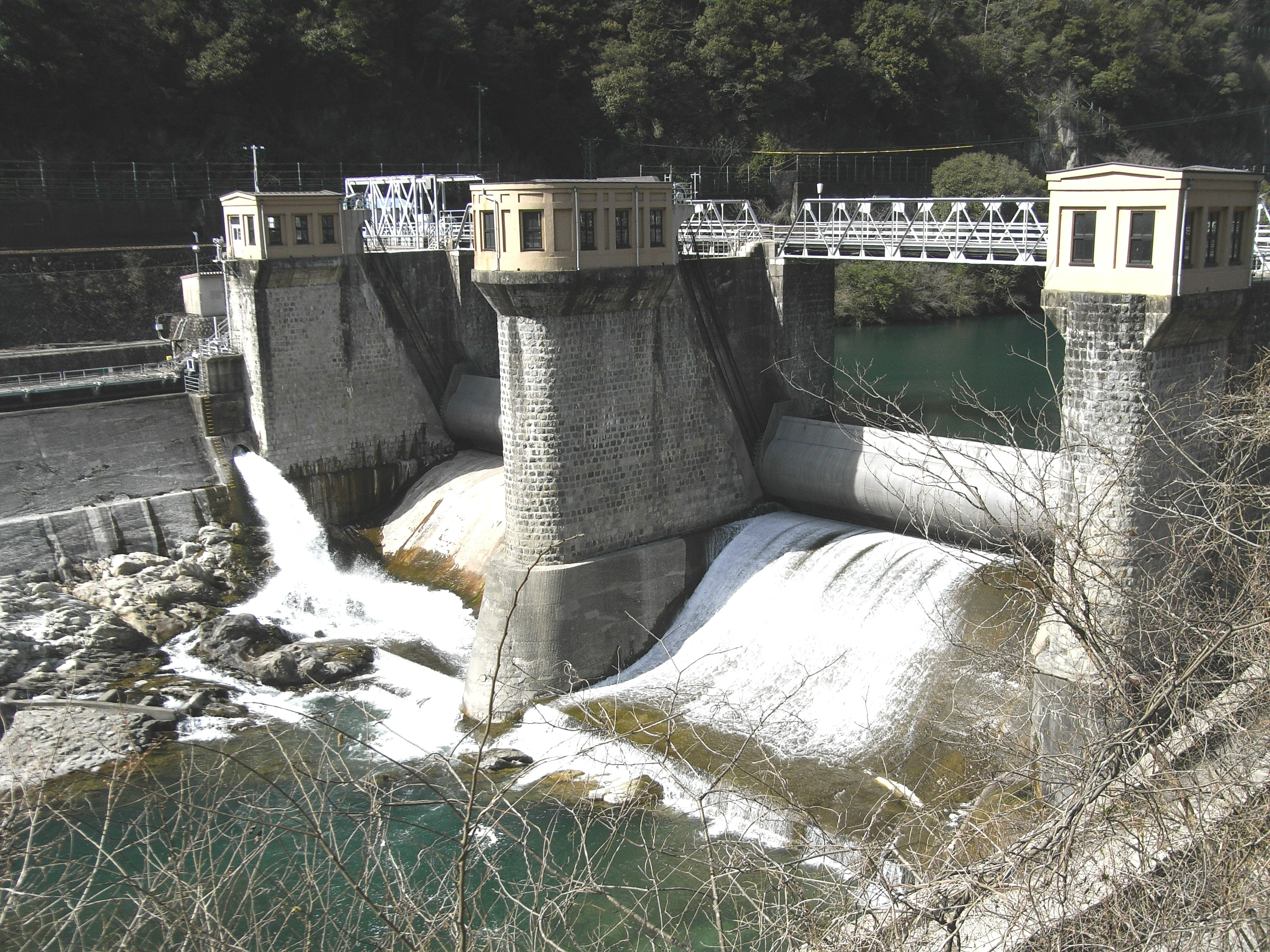
- Interactive map of Kamiasō Dam
- Location: Gifu Prefecture, Japan
- Construction began: 1924
- Opening date: 1926

Dam and spillways
- Impounds: Hida River
- Height: 13.2 m

Reservoir
- Total capacity: 240,000 m^{3}
- Catchment area: 2,021.2 km^{2}

Kamiasō Dam (上麻生ダム, Kamiasō damu) is a dam in the Gifu Prefecture of Japan.

The gravity dam was completed in 1926 and is managed by Chubu Electric Power. The water intake of the "Kamiasō plant" is used to generate 27,000 kilowatts of electricity. and Japan water agency's "Kisogawa Yosui" abstracts water from here, which is used for irrigation and water supply in central Gifu prefecture.
