= Nishi-Nagoya Thermal Power Station =

Thermal power station in Tobishima, Aichi, Japan

Nishi-Nagoya Thermal Power Station 西名古屋火力発電所
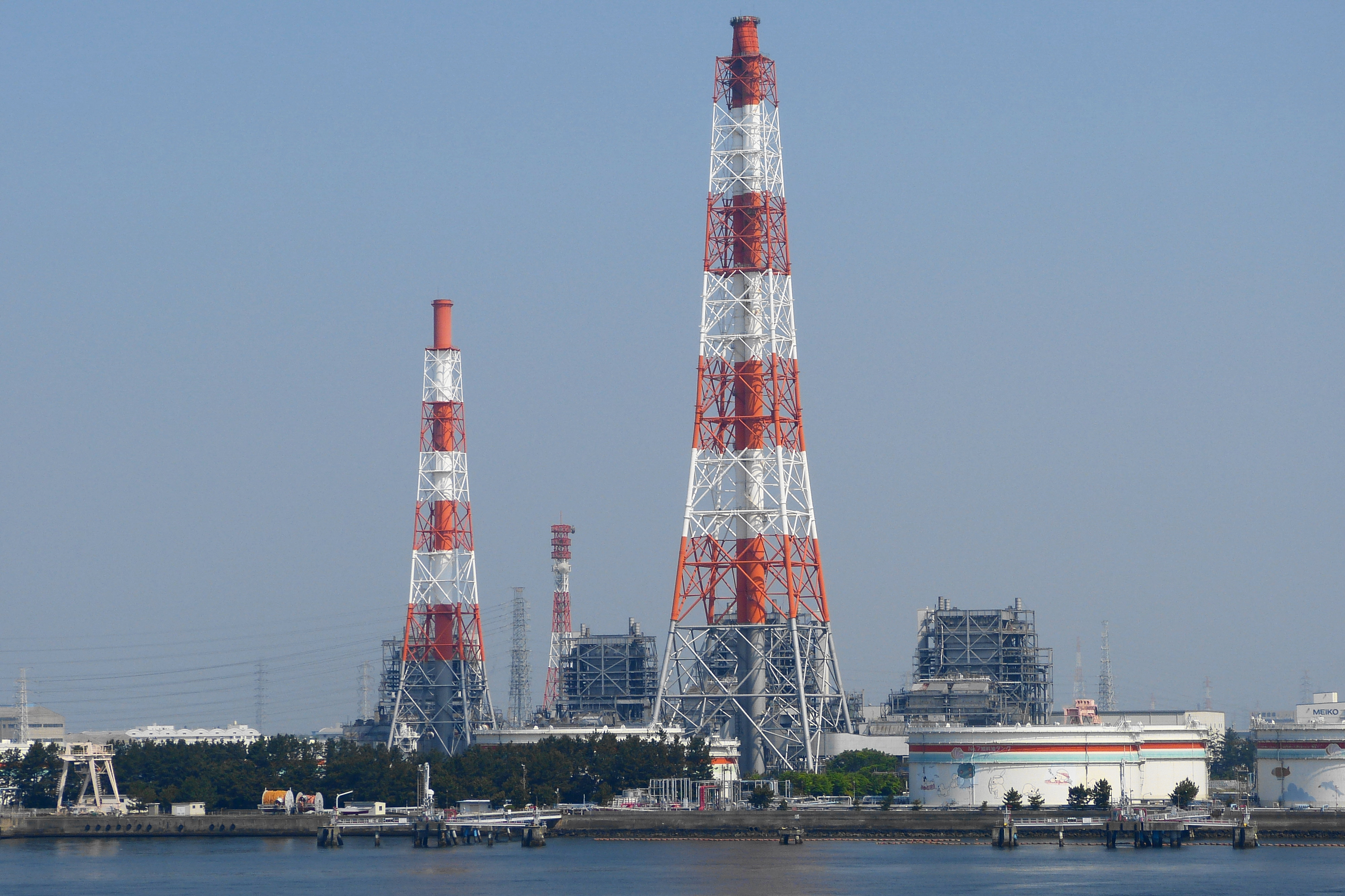
- Nishi-Nagoya Thermal Power Station
- Country: Japan
- Location: Tobishima, Aichi
- Coordinates: 35°01′58.9″N 136°49′49.3″E
- Status: Operational
- Commission date: 1970
- Owner: JERA
- Operator: JERA

Thermal power station
- Primary fuel: LNG

Power generation
- Units operational: 2
- Units decommissioned: 6
- Nameplate capacity: 2376 MW
- Capacity factor: 62.3

Nishi-Nagoya Thermal Power Station (西名古屋火力発電所, Nishi-Nagoya Karyoku Hatsudensho) is an LNG-fired thermal power station operated by JERA in the village of Tobishima, Aichi, Japan. The facility is located on reclaimed land at the head of Mikawa Bay.

== History ==
The Nishi-Nagoya Thermal Power Station began operations in 1970 as an oil-fired power plant operated by Chubu Electric. Unit 1 through unit 6 were constructed between 1970 and 1975. On September 14, 2010, Chubu Electric announced a renewal plan to replace the aging existing facilities with a high-efficiency natural gas-fired combined cycle power generation system.

Construction began on Units 7-1 and 7-2 on January 30, 2014. Unit 7-1 came on-line on September 29, 2017, and Unit 7-2 on March 30, 2018. Both Unit 7-1 and 7-2 use a Toshiba exhaust heat recovery multi-shaft 1,600 °C class combined cycle power generation system (MACCII) in which three generators are connected to three gas turbines and one steam turbine. In order to transport the natural gas used at this power plant, a submarine tunnel with a length of 4.6 km extending from the Chita Daini Thermal Power Station was constructed. In March 2018, Guinness World Records certified the Nishi-Nagoya Thermal Power Station Unit 7-1 as the world's most efficient combined cycle power generation facility.

In April 2019, the operations of Chubu Electric Power were transferred to JERA, a joint venture between Chubu Electric and TEPCO Fuel & Power, Inc, a subsidiary of Tokyo Electric Power Company.

== Plant details ==
Unit	Fuel	Type	Capacity	On line	Status
1	Heavy Oil	Steam turbine	220 MW	1970	Scrapped November 30, 2013
2	Heavy Oil, Crude Oil	Steam turbine	220 MW	1970	Scrapped November 30, 2013
3	Heavy Oil, Crude Oil, Naptha	Steam turbine	375 MW	1972	Scrapped November 30, 2013
4	Heavy Oil, Crude Oil, Naptha	Steam turbine	375 MW	1972	Scrapped November 30, 2013
5	Heavy Oil, Crude Oil	Steam turbine	500 MW	1974	Scrapped December 31, 2002
6	Heavy Oil, Crude Oil	Steam turbine	500 MW	1975	Scrapped December 31, 2003
7-1	Natural Gas	MACC	1188.2 MW	2017	operational
7-2	Natural Gas	MACC	1188.2 MW	2018	operational

== See also ==
- Energy in Japan
- List of power stations in Japan
