= Taketoyo Thermal Power Station =

Thermal power station in Taketoyo, Aichi, Japan

Taketoyo Thermal Power Station 武豊火力発電所
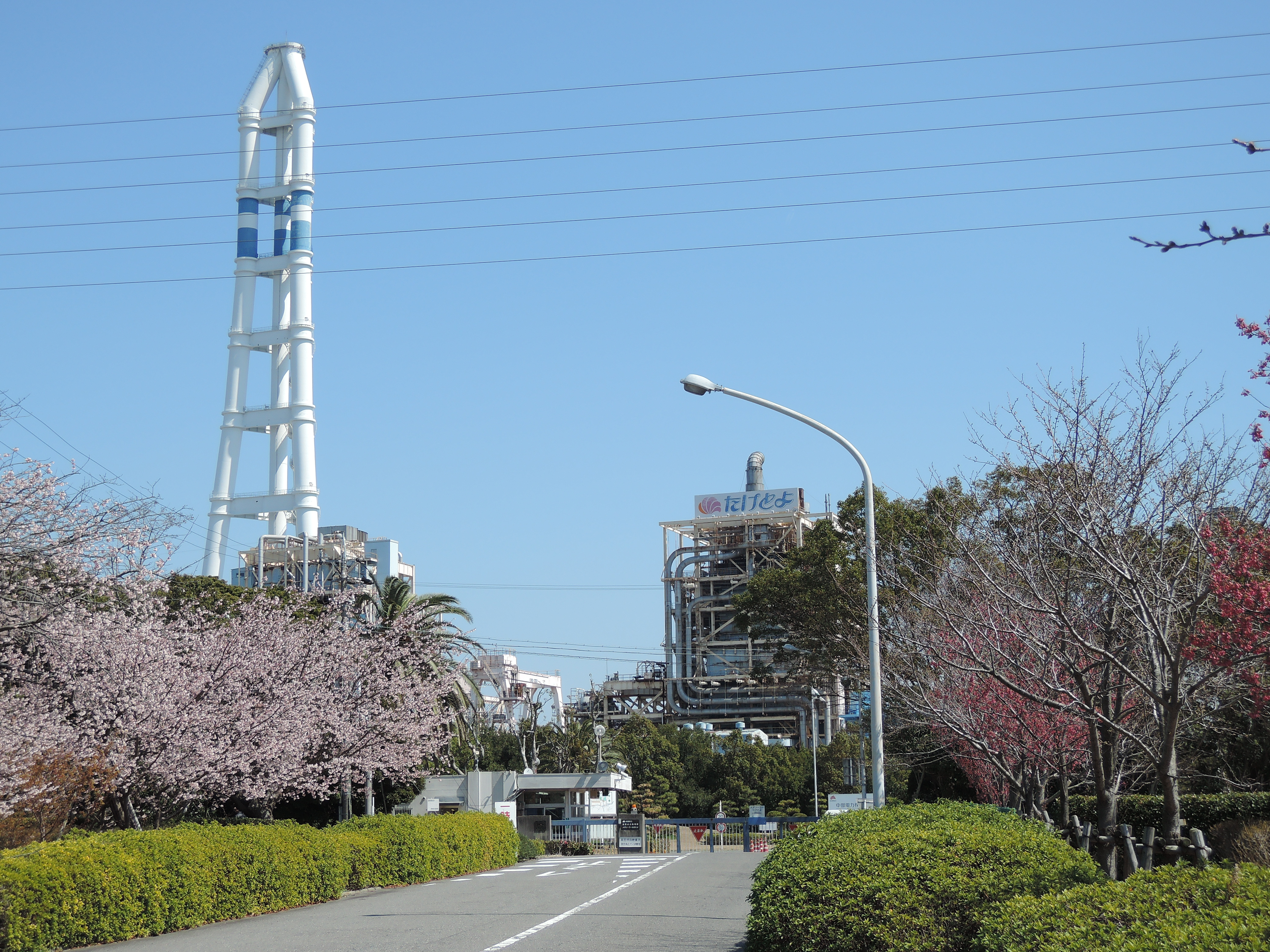
- Taketoyo Thermal Power Station in 2013
- Country: Japan
- Location: Taketoyo, Aichi
- Coordinates: 34°49′28.66″N 136°55′24.76″E
- Status: Commissioned
- Commission date: 1966
- Owner: JERA
- Operator: JERA

Thermal power station
- Primary fuel: Coal
- Secondary fuel: Biomass
- Site area: 660,000 sq.m.

Power generation
- Units operational: 1 x 1070 MW
- Units under const.: 0
- Units decommissioned: 4
- Nameplate capacity: 1070 MW

External links
- Website: Official website

Taketoyo Thermal Power Station (武豊火力発電所, Taketoyo Karyoku Hatsudensho) is a large thermal power station operated by JERA in the city of Taketoyo, Aichi, Japan. The facility is located at the northern end of Chita Peninsula.

== History ==
Plans to build a power station in Taketoyo were drawn up in the late 1950s by Chubu Electric to meet base load demand, and a site was selected on reclaimed land on the west coast of Kinuura Bay (and inlet of Mikawa Bay), approximately 40 kilometers south of the city of Nagoya. Unit 1, with a 220 MW steam turbine, went on line in 1966. The remaining three units came on line in 1972, and served to power the cities of Aichi Prefecture.

Plans were made to close the facility by the mid-2000s due to rising fuel and maintenance costs. Unit 1 was decommissioned in March 2002, and plans were considered to either close Unit 2, or to convert it from oil to coal. However, with the indefinite shutdown of the Hamaoka Nuclear Power Plant in May 2011 due to the 2011 Tōhoku earthquake and tsunami and Fukushima Daiichi nuclear disaster, Unit 2 was restarted on July 31, 2011. On February 6, 2015, a replacement plan was announced to abolish the old oil-fired power generation facilities and to install high-efficiency coal-fired units instead. Units 2-4 were decommissioned on March 31, 2016. However, since carbon dioxide emissions are significantly higher for coal than for LNG combined cycle power generation, concerns about adverse environmental effects and the impact to global warming led to public opposition. Therefore, Chubu Electric decided to use wood biomass fuel (wood pellets) together with coal to reduce the environmental impact.

In April 2019, all thermal power plant operations of Chubu Electric Power were transferred to JERA, a joint venture between Chubu Electric and TEPCO Fuel & Power, Inc, a subsidiary of Tokyo Electric Power Company.

Unit 5 started construction on April 18, 2018 and came online on August 5, 2022.

Taketoyo Thermal Power Station also had an experimental commercial solar power facility, called "Mega-Solar". Consisting of 36,918 solar panels covering an area of 120,000 square meters, the facility produces 7.5 MW of power, and came on line on October 31, 2011. This was dismantled in October 2015 to make way for the construction of coal/biomass-fired Unit 5 and was relocated to Kawagoe Power Station in Mie Prefecture.

== Accident ==
In January 2024, a fire broke out at Taketoyo power station following an explosion. The fire occurred in a temporary storage area for the biomass fuel.

As of September 2024, the power station remained offline. After a JERA investigation, it was revealed that the fire had lasted over five hours, with an explosion causing significant damage to part of the boiler building. The investigation highlighted a series of design flaws that led to the explosion in the biomass wood pellet conveyor system. JERA estimated the cost of the fire for the 2024–2025 financial year to exceed US$68.5 million. Repairs have not yet begun.

== Plant details ==
Unit	Fuel	Type	Capacity	On line	Status
1	Crude Oil, Heavy Oil	Steam turbine	220 MW	1966	Decommissioned March 2002
2	Crude Oil, Heavy Oil	Steam turbine	375 MW	June 1972	Decommissioned March 31, 2016
3	Crude Oil, Heavy Oil	Steam turbine	375 MW	June 1972	Decommissioned March 31, 2016
4	Crude Oil, Heavy Oil	Steam turbine	375 MW	June 1972	Decommissioned March 31, 2016
Mega-Solar	Solar	Photovoltaic	7.5 MW	October 2011	Decommissioned October 2015
5	Coal, Biomass	Steam turbine	1070 MW	August 2022	Operating

== See also ==
- Energy in Japan
- List of power stations in Japan
