= Iwaya Dam =

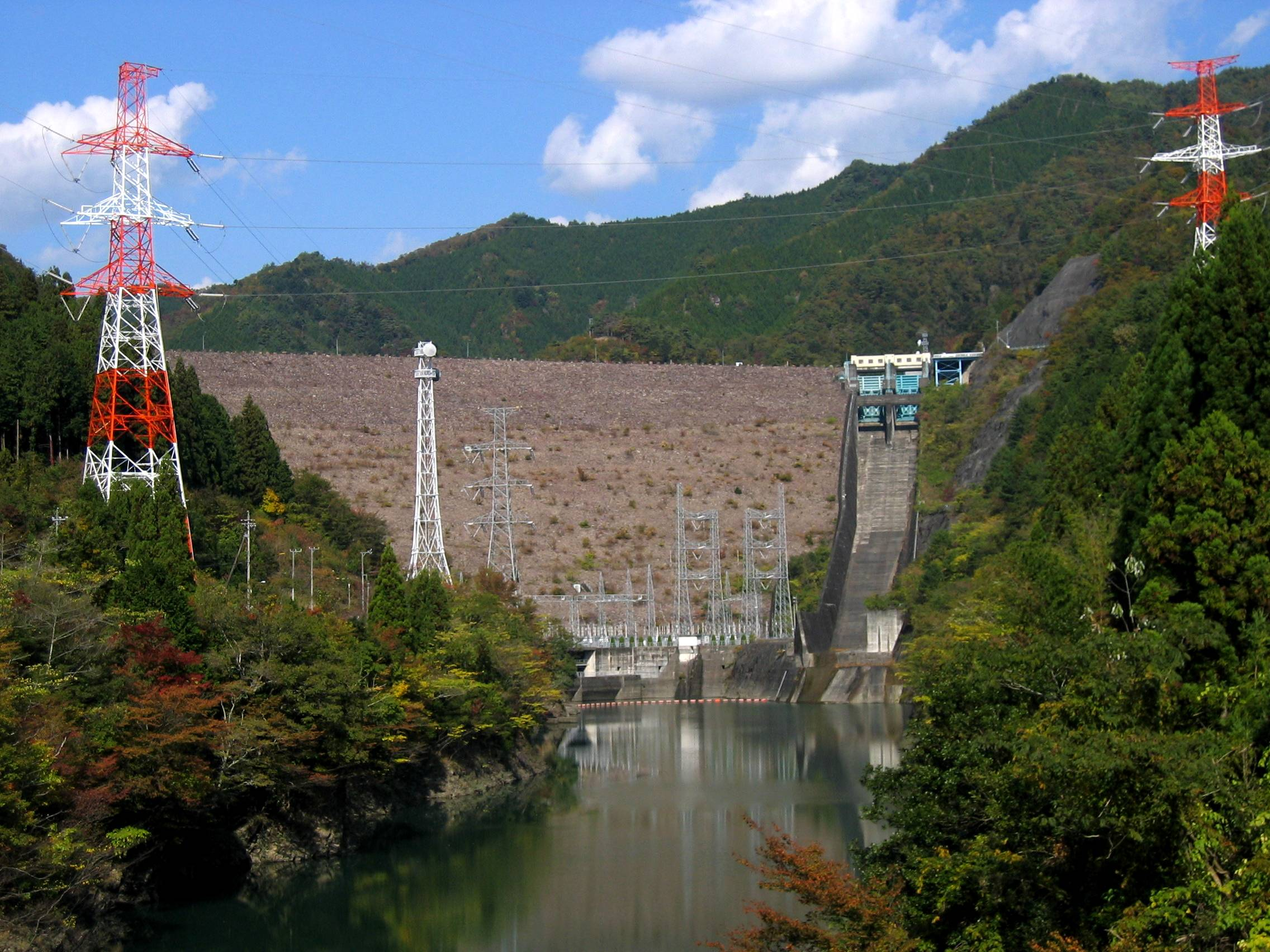
- Interactive map of Iwaya Dam
- Official name: 岩屋ダム
- Location: Gero, Gifu Prefecture, Japan
- Coordinates: 35°45′39.8″N 137°09′25.8″E
- Construction began: 1966
- Opening date: 1976

Dam and spillways
- Impounds: Maze River
- Height: 127.5 meters
- Length: 366.0 meters

Reservoir
- Total capacity: 173,500,000 m^{3}
- Catchment area: 1,734.9 km^{2}
- Surface area: 424 hectares

Power Station
- Installed capacity: 28.8 MW

The Iwaya Dam (Iwaya Damu) is a dam in the city of Gero, Gifu Prefecture, Japan on the Maze River, part of the Kiso River system. The dam is a rockfill dam with a height of 127 meters and was constructed as a multipurpose dam for flood control, supply of municipal and industrial water, irrigation water and hydroelectric power generation. The reservoir created by the dam supplies the Chubu Electric Power Company's Mazegawa No.1 Power plant with a capacity of 288 MW hydroelectric power station.

157 households were flooded during the construction of the dam.
