= Tobishima =

Village in Aichi Prefecture, Japan

Tobishima 飛島村
- Village
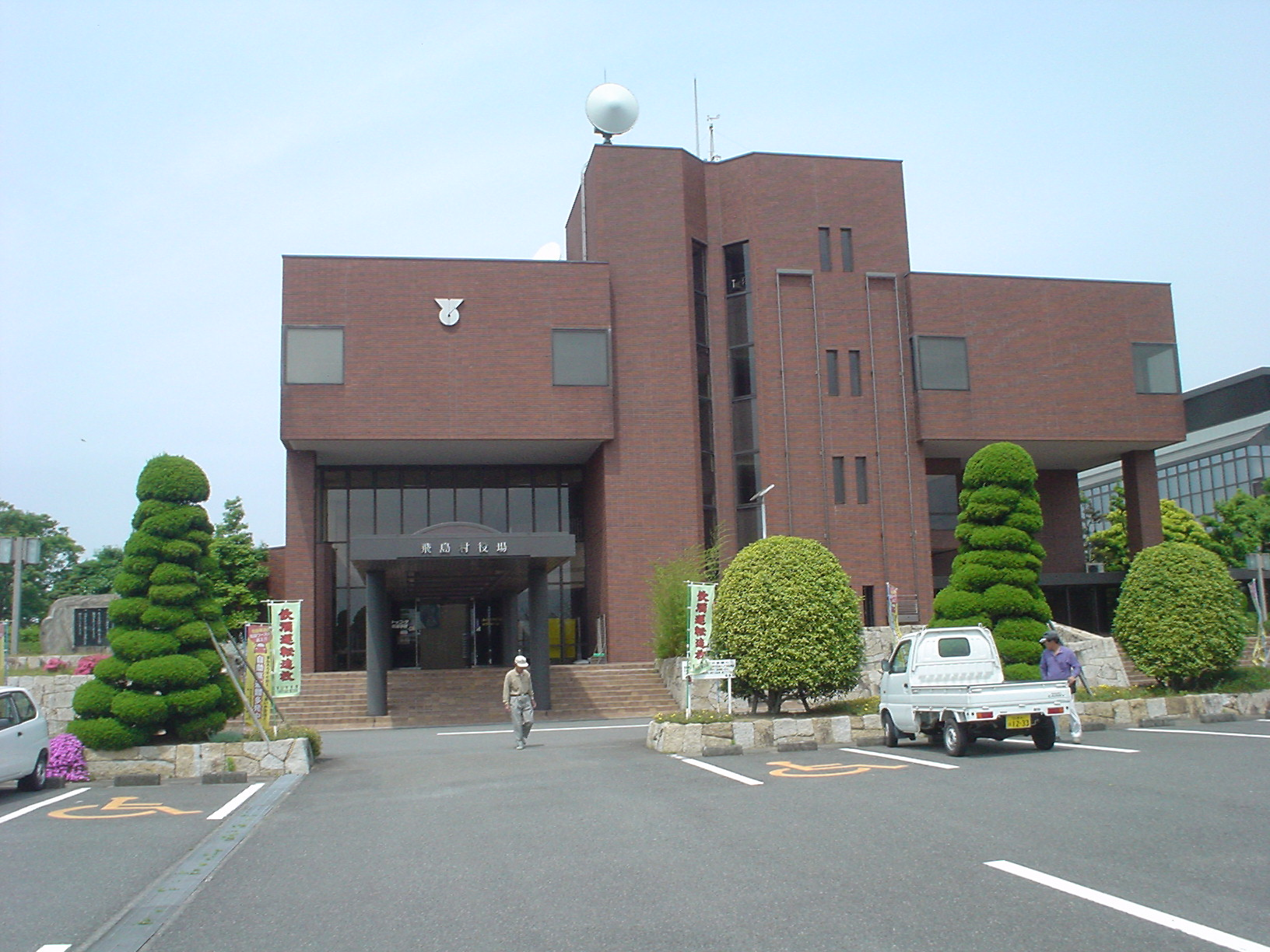
- Tobishima village hall

- Flag Seal

- Location of Tobishima in Aichi Prefecture

- Coordinates: 35°4′43.6″N 136°47′28.1″E
- Country: Japan
- Region: Chūbu region Tōkai region
- Prefecture: Aichi
- District: Ama

Area
  - Total: 22.42 km^{2} (8.66 sq mi)

Population (October 1, 2019)
  - Total: 4,609
  - Density: 205.6/km^{2} (532.4/sq mi)
- Time zone: UTC+9 (Japan Standard Time)
- Tree: Sakura
- Flower: Chrysanthemum
- Phone number: 0567-52-1231
- Address: 3-1 Takenogo Tobishima-mura, Ama-gun, Aichi-ken 490-1436
- Website: Official website

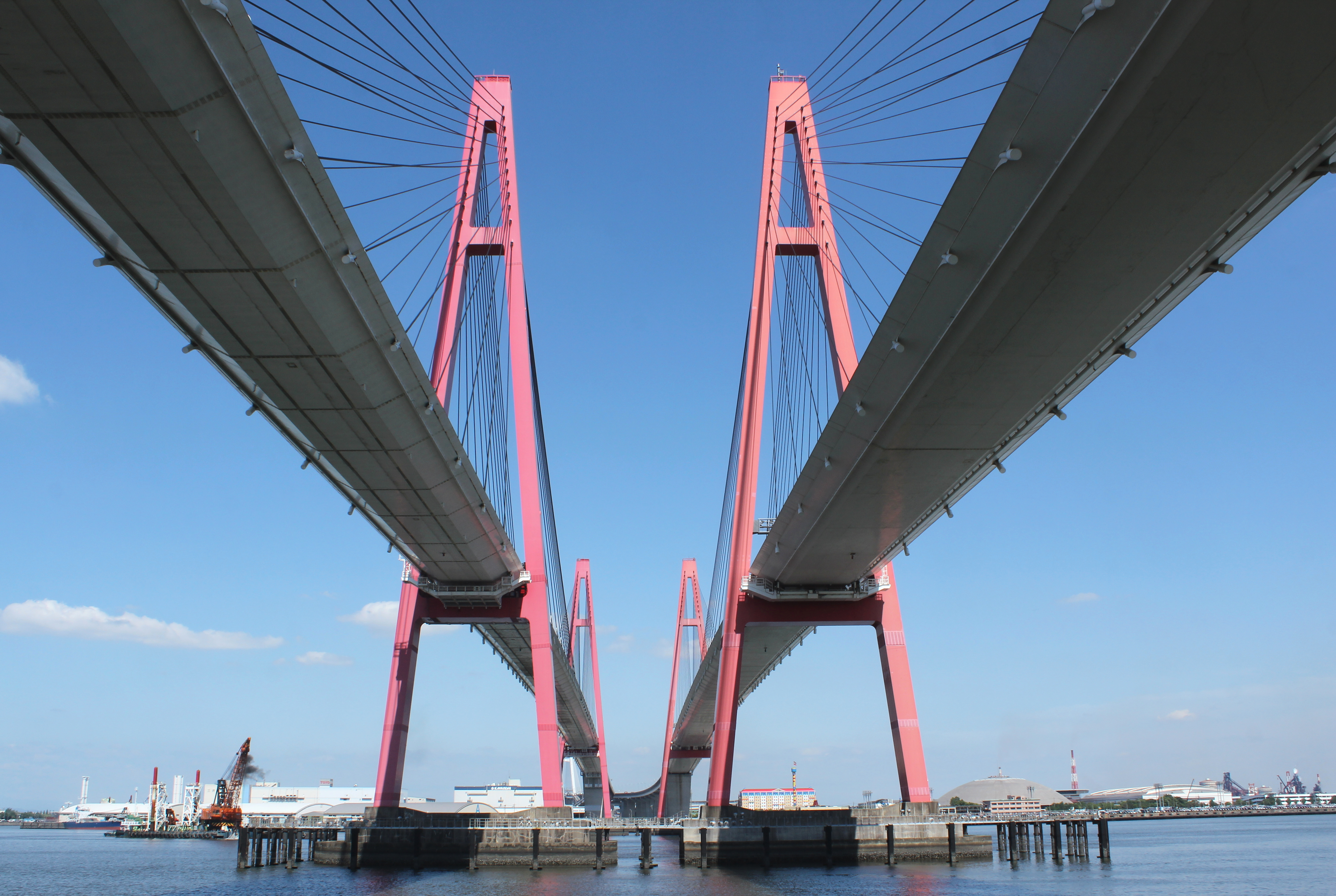
Meiko West Bridge

Tobishima (飛島村, Tobishima-mura) is a village located in Ama District, Aichi Prefecture, in the Tōkai region of Japan. As of 1 October 2019, the town had an estimated population of 4,609 in 1765 households, and a population density of 206 persons per km^{2}. The total area of the village was 22.42 square kilometres (8.66 sq mi).

The village contains the place "Aichi-ken Ama-gun Tobishima-mura Ooaza-tobishima Shinden-aza Take-no-gou Yotare Minami-no-wari", which has a claim on having the longest name in Japan.

== Geography ==
Tobishima is situated in south-western Aichi Prefecture, bordered by the metropolis of Nagoya to the east, and Ise Bay to the south. Most of the village is at sea level.

=== Neighboring municipalities ===
- Aichi Prefecture
  - Kanie
  - Nagoya
  - Yatomi

== Demographics ==
Per Japanese census data, the population of Tobishima has remained steady over the past 70 years.

Historical population
Year	Pop.	±%
1940	3,831	—
1950	4,316	+12.7%
1960	4,413	+2.2%
1970	4,381	−0.7%
1980	4,709	+7.5%
1990	4,630	−1.7%
2000	4,525	−2.3%
2010	4,525	+0.0%

=== Climate ===
The village has a climate characterized by characterized by hot and humid summers, and relatively mild winters (Köppen climate classification Cfa). The average annual temperature in Tobishima is 15.7 °C. The average annual rainfall is 1651 mm with September as the wettest month. The temperatures are highest on average in August, at around 27.7 °C, and lowest in January, at around 4.6 °C.

== History ==
Tobishima was developed on reclaimed land by the Tokugawa shogunate and again during the Meiji period. The modern village was established on October 1, 1889, with the Meiji period establishment of the modern municipalities system. The village suffered from damage during the 1944 Tōnankai earthquake and the 1959 Isewan typhoon. As a result, an eight-meter tall seawall was constructed to protect the village against storm surges in 1962.

== Economy ==
Tobishima has a mixed agricultural and industrial economy. The Nishi-Nagoya Thermal Power Station is also located in Tobishima and is a source of tax revenue for the village.

== Education ==
Tobishima has one combined public elementary/middle school operated by the village government. The village does not have a high school.

== Transportation ==
=== Railway ===
- Tobishima does not have any passenger railway service. The nearest train station is Kintetsu-Kanie in the neighboring town of Kanie.

=== Highways ===
- Isewangan Expressway – Tobishima IC
- Mei-Nikan Expressway
- National Route 23
- National Route 302

== Sister city relations ==
- - Rio Vista, California, United States, sister cities since April 6, 2007
