= Kuguno Dam =

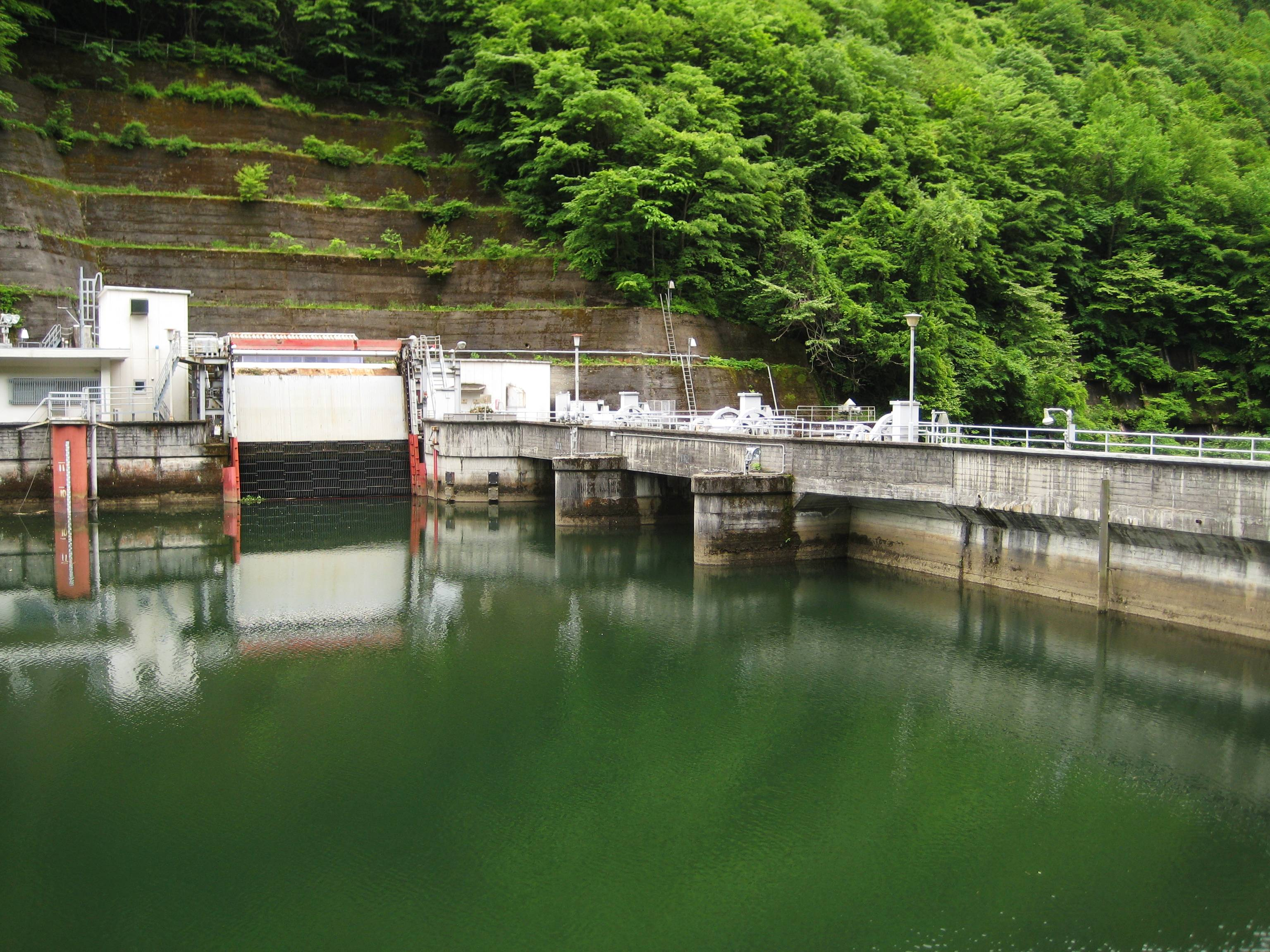
- Interactive map of Kuguno Dam
- Location: Takayama, Gifu Prefecture, Japan
- Coordinates: 36°4′26″N 137°23′28″E

Dam and spillways
- Impounds: Hida River

Kuguno Dam (久々野ダム, Kuguno damu) is a dam in Takayama, Gifu Prefecture, Japan, completed in 1962.

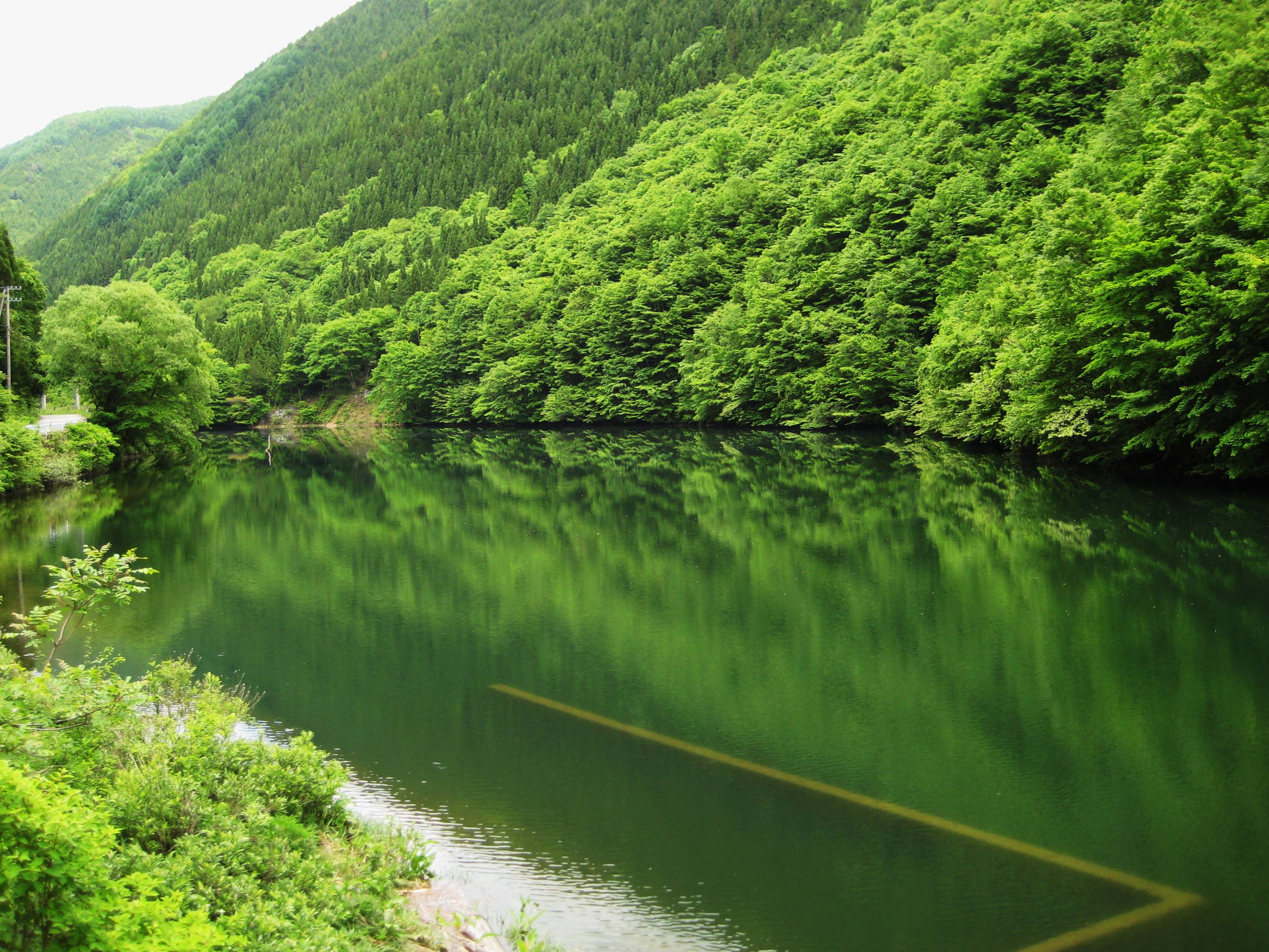
