= Yotare Minaminowari, Azatakenogō, Ōazatobishimashinden, Tobishima, Aichi =

Neighborhood in Japan

Coordinates: 35°04′36″N 136°48′31″E

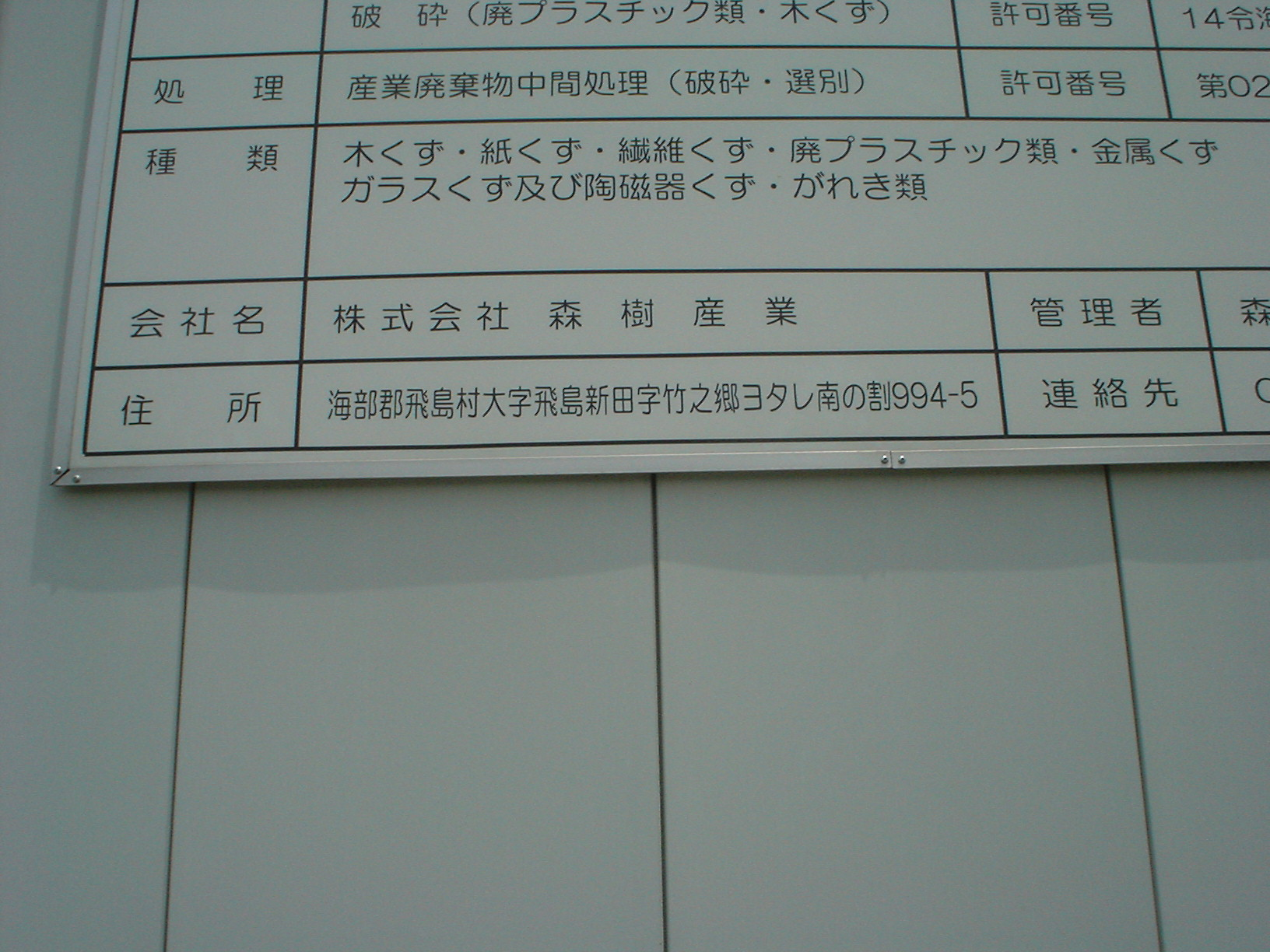
The sign of construction license hung at the construction site in Tobishima-shinden Take-no-go Yotare Minaminowari. The address is written at its lower column.

The Yotare Minami-no-wari, Aza-take-no-gō, Ōaza-tobishima-shinden, Tobishima-mura, Ama-gun, Aichi-ken (愛知県海部郡飛島村大字飛島新田字竹之郷ヨタレ南ノ割, Aichi-ken Ama-gun Tobishima-mura Ōaza Tobishima-Shinden Aza Take-no-gō Yotare-minami-no-wari) was a neighborhood in the village of Tobishima, Aichi Prefecture, Japan. It was the longest place name in Japan. The name has now been changed to simply Take-no-gō (竹之郷).
