= Chita Daini Thermal Power Station =

Thermal power station in Aichi, Japan

Chita Daini Thermal Power Station 知多第二火力発電所
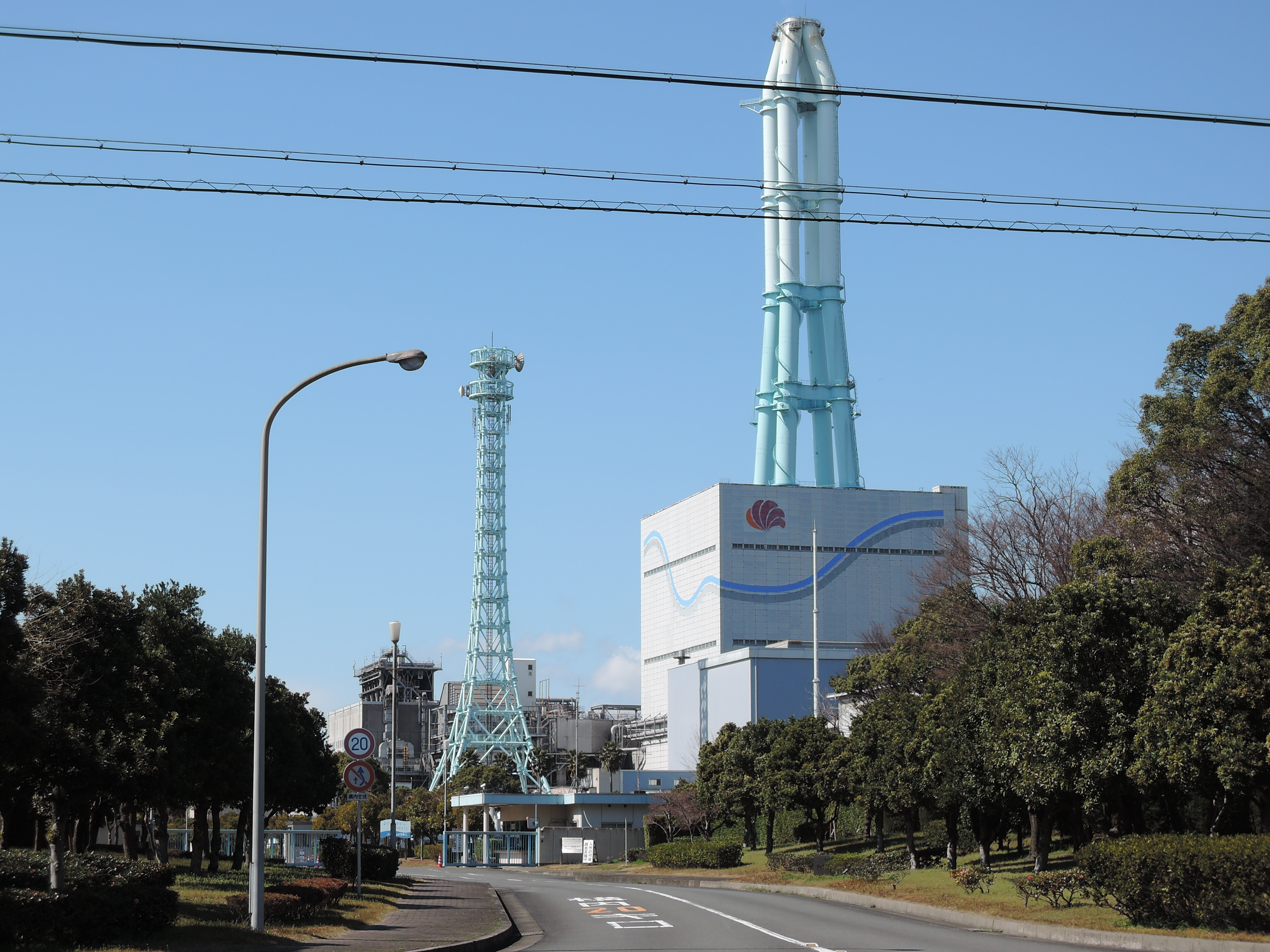
- Chita Daini Thermal Power Station
- Country: Japan
- Location: Chita, Aichi
- Coordinates: 35°0′23.58″N 136°51′50.88″E
- Status: Operational
- Commission date: 1983
- Owner: JERA
- Operator: JERA

Thermal power station
- Primary fuel: LNG

Power generation
- Units operational: 2
- Nameplate capacity: 1708 MW

External links
- Commons: Related media on Commons

Chita Daini Thermal Power Station (知多第二火力発電所, Chita Dai-ni Karyoku Hatsudensho) is an LNG-fired thermal power station operated by JERA in the city of Chita, Aichi, Japan. The facility is located on reclaimed land at the east side of Ise Bay. It is located about three kilometers northeast of the Chita Thermal Power Station.

== History ==
The Chita Daini Thermal Power Station began operations LNG-fired power plant operated by Chubu Electric in September 1983. From 1994-1996, both units were converted into a combined cycle power generation system with the addition of an additional gas turbine to use the waste heat of the steam turbine. The existing steam power generation facility can be operated independently even when the gas turbine power generation facility is stopped. The steam turbines were supplied by Toshiba as was the gas turbine for Unit 2. The gas turbine for Unit 1 was supplied by Hitachi.

In April 2019, the operations of Chubu Electric Power were transferred to JERA, a joint venture between Chubu Electric and TEPCO Fuel & Power, Inc, a subsidiary of Tokyo Electric Power Company.

== Plant details ==
Unit	Fuel	Type	Capacity	On line	Status
1	Natural Gas	CC Steam / Gas Turbine	854 MW	1983	operational
2	Natural Gas	CC Steam / Gas Turbine	854 MW	1983	operational

== See also ==
- Energy in Japan
- List of power stations in Japan
