= Maze River (Japan) =

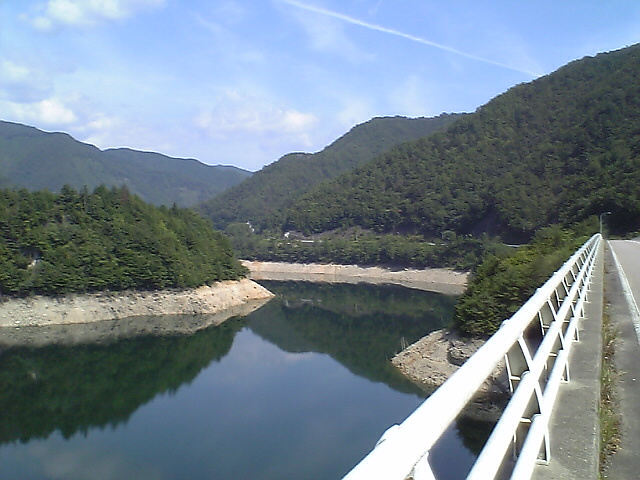
- Lake Kanayama along the Maze River

- Native name: 馬瀬川 (Japanese)

Location
- Country: Japan

Physical characteristics
- Mouth
  - location: Hida River
- Length: 76 km (47 mi)
- Basin size: 1,379 km^{2} (532 sq mi)

Basin features
- River system: Kiso River

The Maze River (馬瀬川, Maze-gawa) is a river in Japan which originates in Takayama, Gifu. It flows through Gero before emptying into the Hida River. Due to its clear waters, it is home to the Japanese giant salamander.

== Major dams ==
The river has two major dams along its length, the Iwaya Dam and the Mazegawa Dam. The Mazegawa Dam lead to the formation of the Lake Kanayama.
