= Chita Thermal Power Station =

Thermal power station in Aichi, Japan

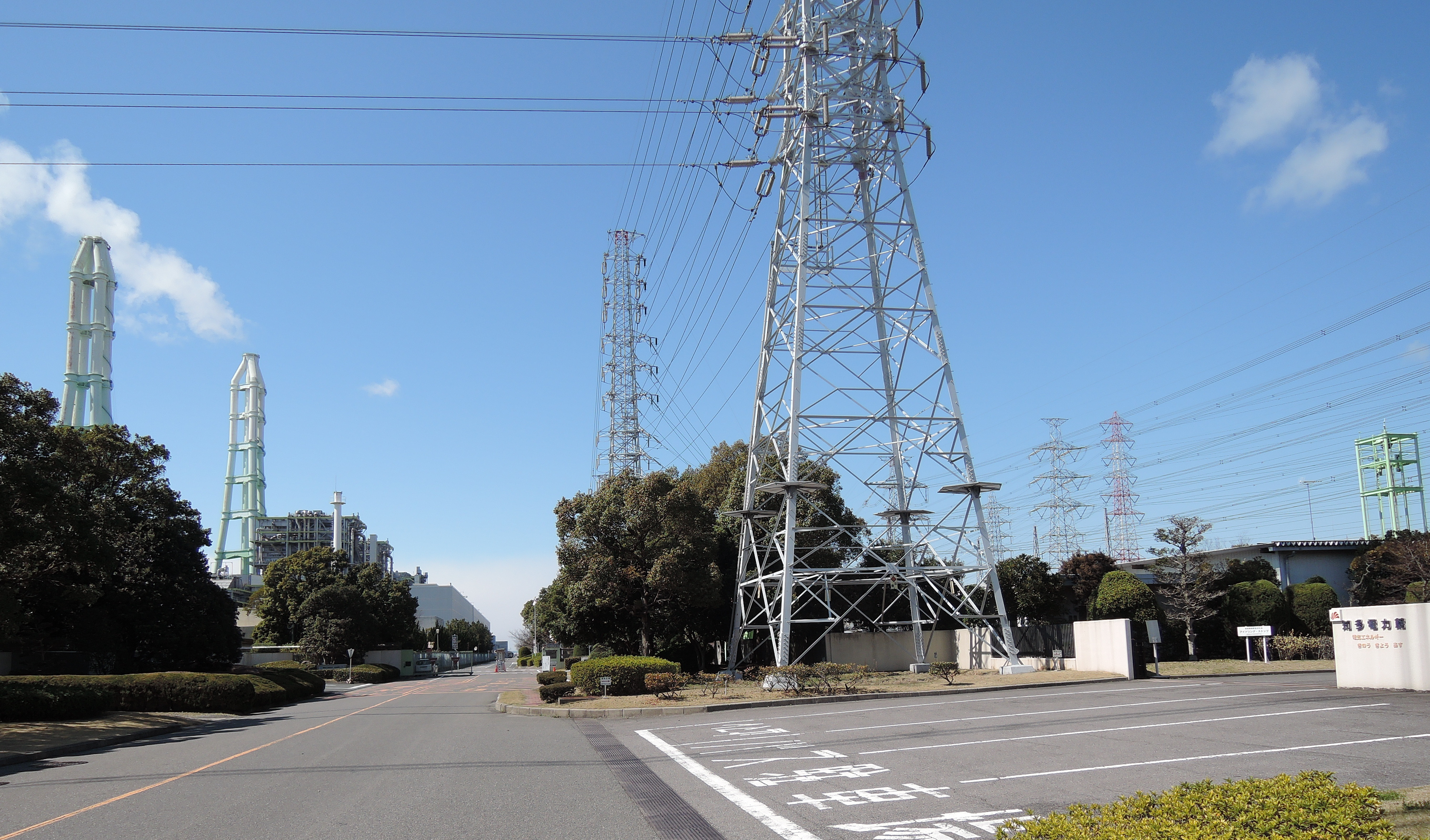
- Chita Thermal Power Station
- Country: Japan
- Location: Chita, Aichi
- Coordinates: 34°59′12″N 136°50′37″E
- Status: Operational
- Commission date: 1966
- Owners: Chubu Electric Power; JERA
- Operator: JERA

Thermal power station
- Primary fuel: Natural gas
- Site area: 560,000 sq m

Power generation
- Units operational: 2
- Units decommissioned: 4
- Nameplate capacity: 1708 MW
- Capacity factor: 43.5

External links
- Website: Official website
- Commons: Related media on Commons

Chita Thermal Power Station (知多火力発電所, Chita Karyoku Hatsudensho) is a large thermal power station operated by JERA in the city of Chita, Aichi, Japan.

== History ==
Plans to build a power station in Chita were drawn up in the early 1960s, and a site was selected on reclaimed land facing Ise Bay in the northern part of Chita Peninsula.

Unit 1 came on line in February 1966. A total of six units were built between 1966 and 1974 to power the cities and industries of Aichi Prefecture and Nagoya Metropolis.

Units 1 through 4 were modernized and converted to burn natural gas in 1985, whereas Units 5 and 6 were designed as LNG-fired plants from the start. From 1992 to 1996, Units 1, 2, 5 and 6 were shut down and were converted into combined cycle plants by adding a gas turbine to the existing boiler-steam turbine units to reuse exhaust gases. This gave the Chita Thermal Power Station a total power generating capacity of 3966 MW, making it one of the largest in Japan at the time.

Unit 1 was taken offline on March 15, 2017, followed by Unit 2 and Unit 3 on April 1, 2017, and Unit 4 on October 31, 2017. As these units have not been demolished, the JERA home page still lists the nameplate capacity of the plant as 3,966 MW.

In April 2019, all thermal power plant operations of Chubu Electric Power were transferred to JERA, a joint venture between Chubu Electric and TEPCO Fuel & Power, Inc, a subsidiary of Tokyo Electric Power Company.

== Plant details ==
Unit	Fuel	Type	Capacity	On line	Status
1	LNG	Combined cycle	529 MW	Feb 1966	Offline from March 2017
2	LNG	Combined cycle	529 MW	Jan 1967	Offline from Apr 2017
3	LNG, Crude Oil, Heavy Oil	Steam Turbine	500 MW	Mar 1968	Offine from Apr 2017
4	LNG, Crude Oil, Heavy Oil	Steam Turbine	700 MW	Mar 1974	Offine from Oct 2017
5	LNG	Combined cycle	854 MW	March 1978	operational
6	LNG	Combined cycle	854 MW	April 1978	operational

== See also ==
- Energy in Japan
- List of power stations in Japan
