= Asahi Dam (Fukushima) =

Coordinates: 37°15′15.9″N 139°52′4.6″E

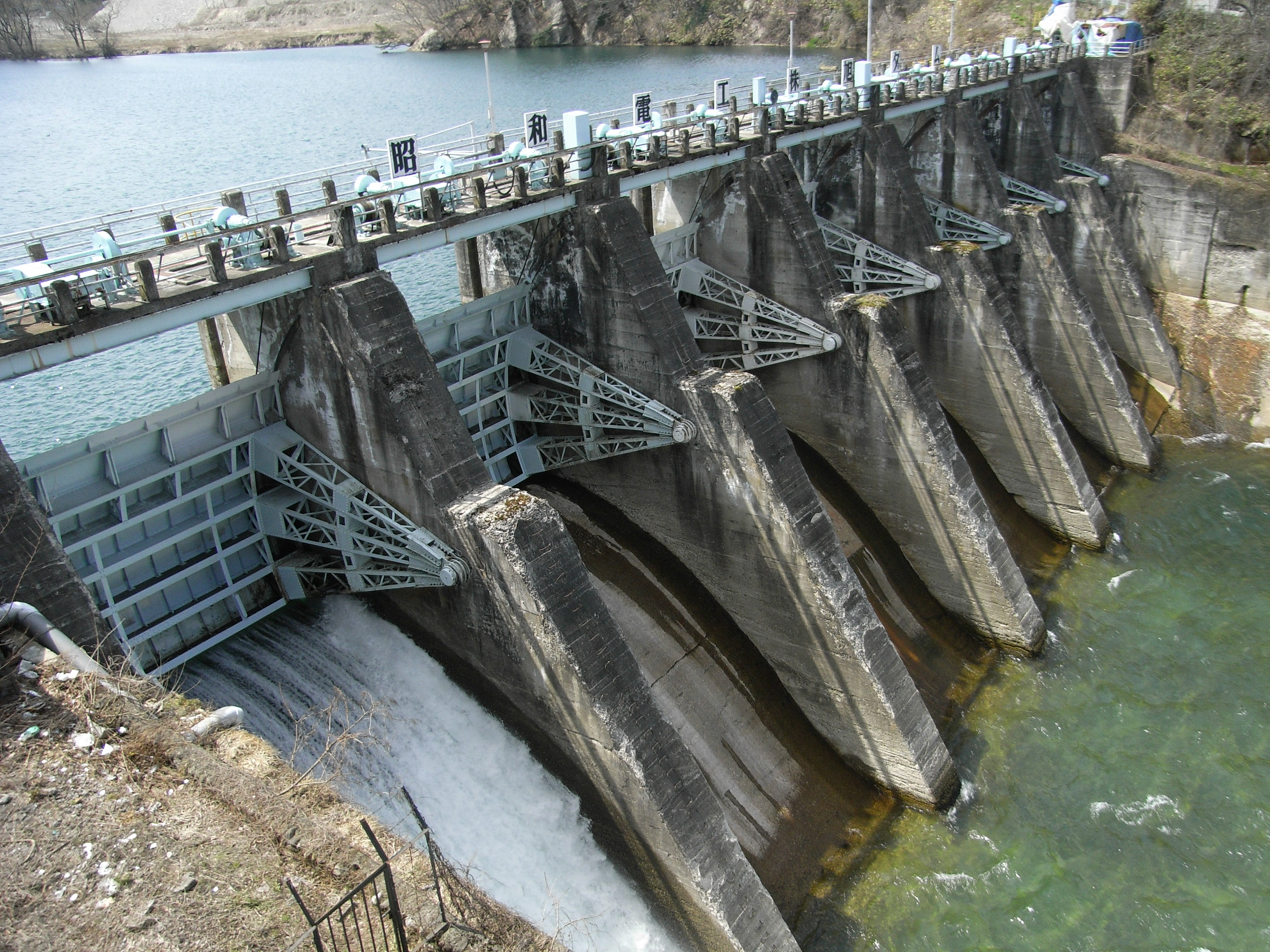
- Location: Shimogō, Fukushima, Japan

Dam and spillways
- Impounds: Agano River

Asahi Dam (旭ダム) is a dam in Shimogō, Fukushima Prefecture, Japan, completed in 1935.
