= Kamiosu Dam =

Dam in Gifu Prefecture, Japan

Kamiōsu Dam
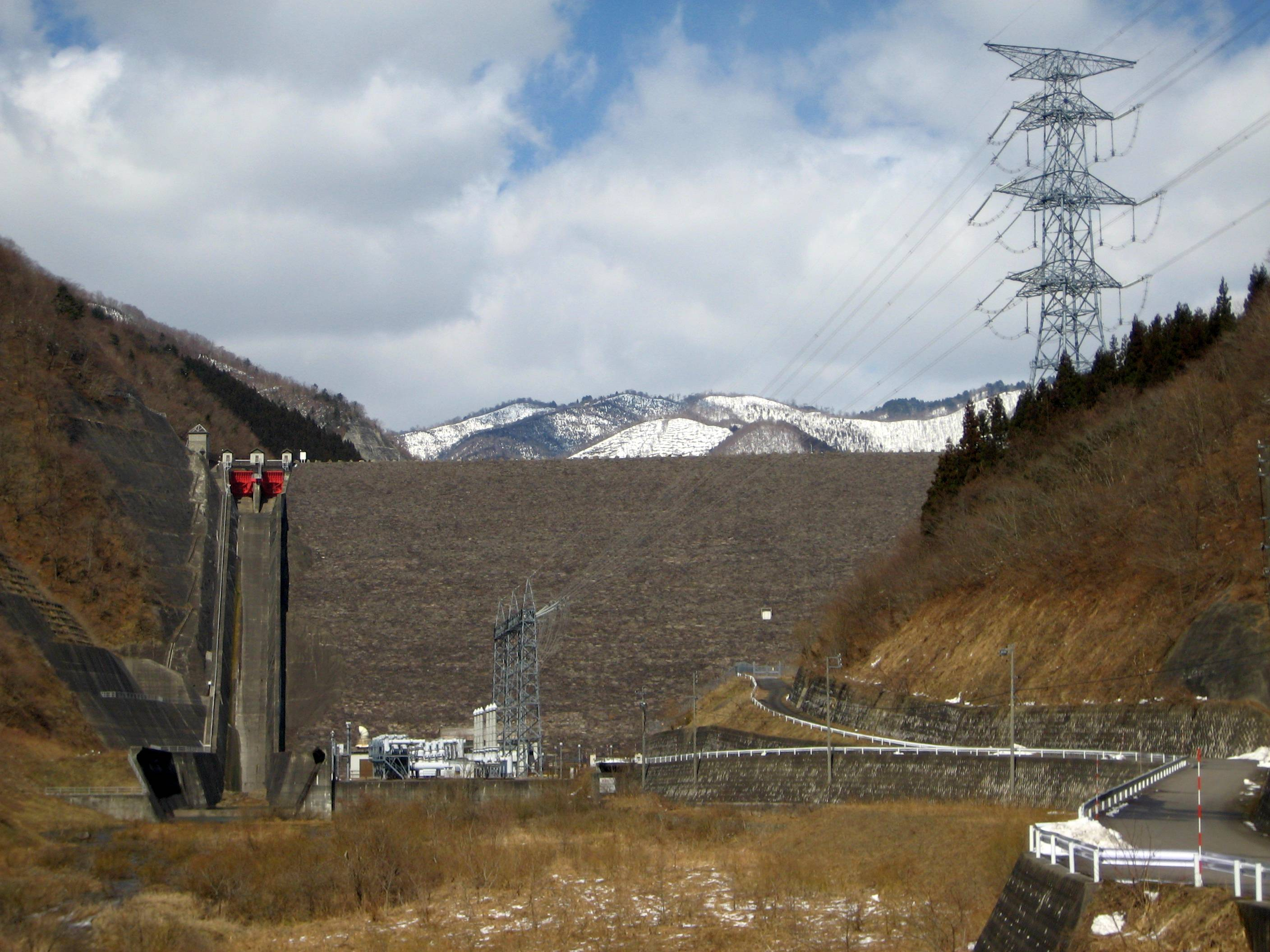
- Location: Motosu, Gifu Prefecture, Japan.
- Coordinates: 35°44′15″N 136°39′43″E
- Construction began: 1976
- Opening date: 1995

Dam and spillways
- Height: 98.0 m
- Length: 294.5 m

Reservoir
- Total capacity: 14,900,000 m^{3}
- Catchment area: 12 km^{2}
- Surface area: 45 hectares

Kamiohsu Dam is a rockfill dam located in Gifu Prefecture in Japan. The dam is used for power production. The catchment area of the dam is 12 km^{2}. The dam impounds about 45 ha of land when full and can store 14500 thousand cubic meters of water. The construction of the dam was started on 1976 and completed in 1995.
