= Akigami Dam =

Dam in Gifu Prefecture, Japan

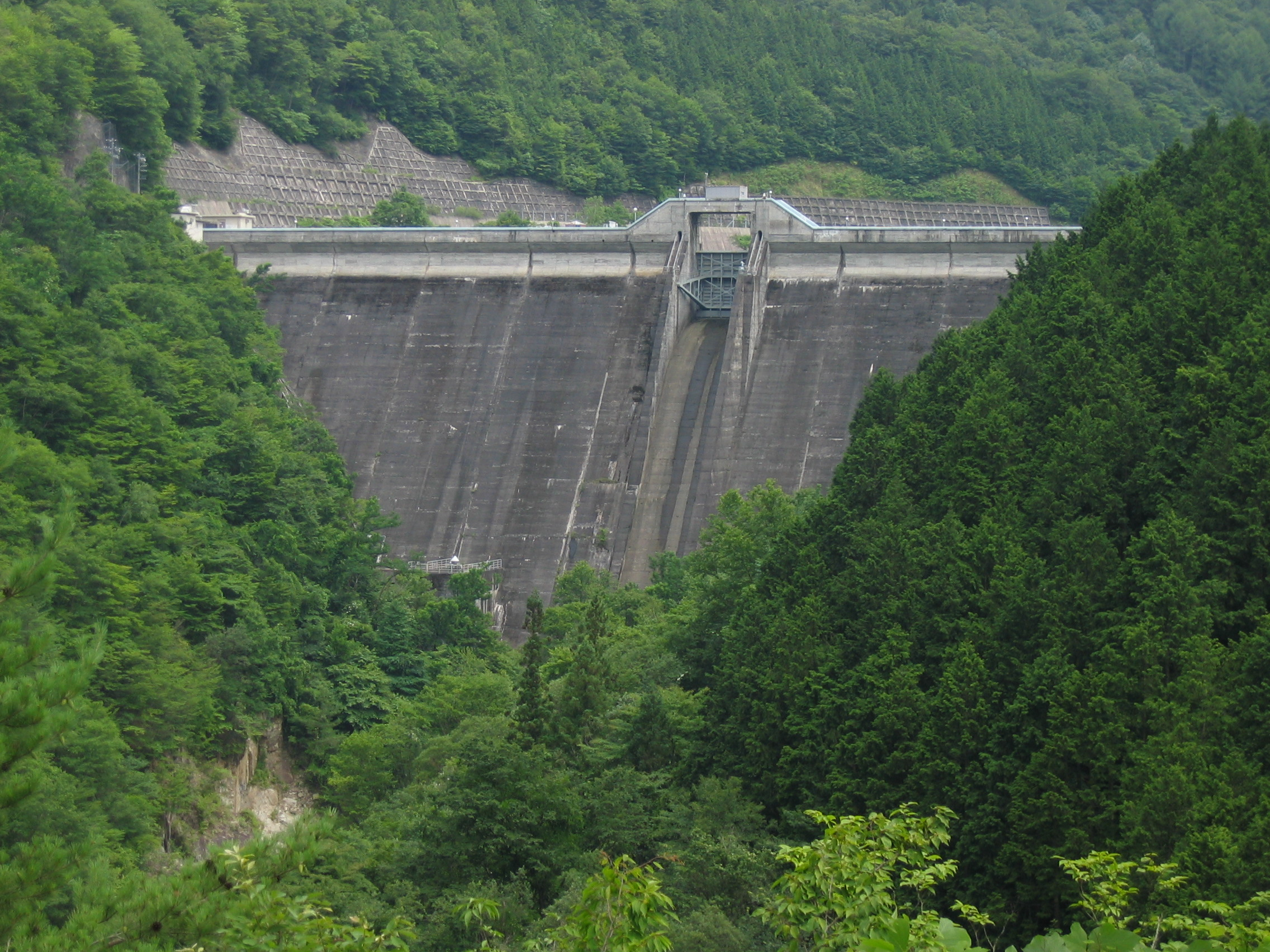

- Location within Japan
- Location: Gifu Prefecture, Japan
- Coordinates: 36°3′56″N 137°23′57″E
- Construction began: 1952
- Opening date: 1953

Dam and spillways
- Height: 74 m (243 ft)
- Length: 192 m (630 ft)

Reservoir
- Total capacity: 17584 thousand cubic meters
- Catchment area: 83.3 sq. km
- Surface area: 73 hectares

Akigami Dam is a gravity dam located in Gifu Prefecture in Japan. The dam is used for power production. The catchment area of the dam is 83.3 km^{2}. The dam impounds about 73 ha of land when full and can store 17584 thousand cubic meters of water. The construction of the dam was started on 1952 and completed in 1953.
