= Nishimura Dam =

Dam in Gifu Prefecture, Japan

Coordinates: 35.8136°N 137.1890°E

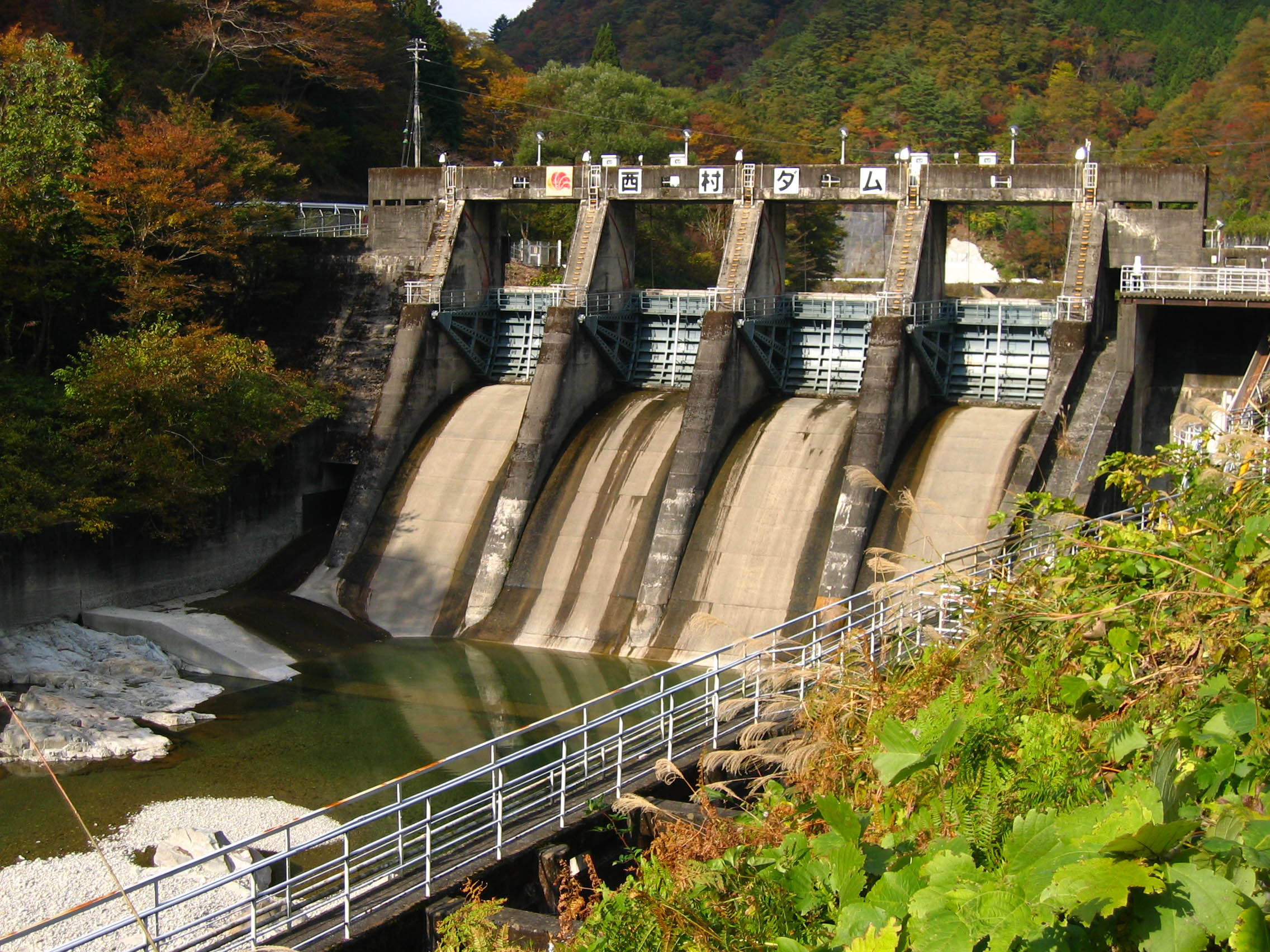
- Interactive map of Nishimura Dam
- Location: Gifu Prefecture, Japan.

Nishimura Dam (西村ダム, Nishimura damu) is a dam in the Gifu Prefecture of Japan, completed in 1938.
