= Chubu Electric Power =

Japanese electric utilities provider

Chubu Electric Power Co., Inc.

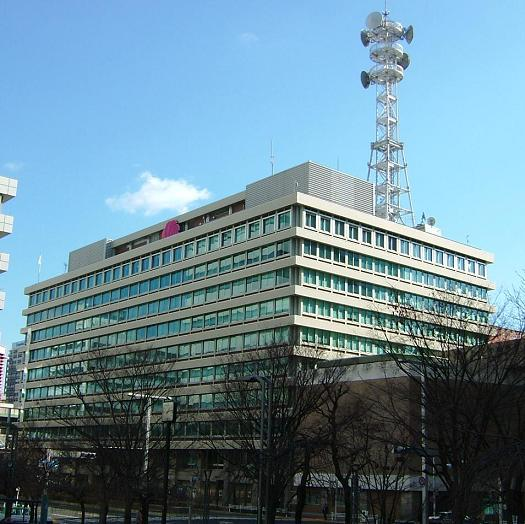
- The headquarters in Nagoya, Aichi, Japan
- Native name: 中部電力株式会社
- Romanized name: Chūbu Denryoku kabushiki gaisha
- Type: Public (Kabushiki gaisha)
- Traded as: TYO: 9502; NAG: 9502; TOPIX Large70 component (TYO)
- Industry: Energy
- Founded: May 1, 1951; 75 years ago
- Founder: Douglas MacArthur, SCAP
- Headquarters: Higashi-ku, Nagoya, Japan
- Area served: Aichi, Nagano and part of Gifu, Mie, Shizuoka Prefectures
- Key people: Akihisa Mizuno (Chairman); Satoru Katsuno (President)
- Products: Natural gas production, sale and distribution, electricity generation and distribution, hydroelectricity, wind power, energy trading
- Revenue: ▲¥3.61 trillion (FY, 2023, consolidated)
- Operating income: ▲¥121,483 million (FY, 2016, consolidated)
- Net income: ▲¥403.14 billion (FY, 2023, consolidated)
- Total assets: ▲¥5,412,307 million (FY, 2016, consolidated)
- Total equity: ▲¥1,724,713 million (FY, 2016, consolidated)
- Number of employees: 28,370 (March 2024, consolidated)
- Website: www.chuden.co.jp/english

Chubu Electric Power Co., Inc. (Japanese: 中部電力株式会社, Chūbu Denryoku Kabushiki Kaisha), abbreviated as Chuden in Japanese, is a Japanese electric utilities provider for the middle Chūbu region of the Honshu island of Japan. It provides electricity at 60 Hz, though an area of Nagano Prefecture uses 50 Hz. Chubu Electric Power ranks third among Japan's largest electric utilities in terms of power generation capacity, electric energy sold, and annual revenue. It is also one of Nagoya's "four influential companies" along with Meitetsu, Matsuzakaya, and Toho Gas. Recently, the company has also expanded into the business of optical fibers. On January 1, 2006, a new company, Chubu Telecommunications, was formed.

== History ==
Chubu Electric Power Company was established on May 1st, 1951, based on the 1950 Electricity Industry Reorganization Order (Cabinet Order No. 342 of 1950).

In 2008, Chubu Electric formed a joint venture with French utility company EDF to purchase coal. In 2016, Chubu Electric acquired EDF Trading’s coal and freight business and passed it onto its subsidiary JERA. EDF Trading acquired a 33 per cent stake in JERA Trading as a part of the transaction while JERA took full control of the Amstuw BV, the operator of the Rietlanden coal terminal in the Netherlands and EDF Trading Australia.

In 2015, Chubu Electric and Tokyo Electric Power Company (TEPCO) created a 50:50 joint venture JERA to handle the upstream energy and Liquefied natural gas (LNG) fuel procurement for both companies. In March 2017, the two companies signed an agreement to integrate their fossil fuel power plants under the JERA joint venture. The Fair Trade Commission (FTC) approved the integration plan in 13 October 2017.

In August 2013, Chubu announced it would acquire an 80% stake in the Tokyo-based electricity supplier, Diamond Corp, marking the firm's entry into a market usually associated with Tokyo Electric Power Company (TEPCO).

In November 2019, a consortium of Mitsubishi (80%) and Chubu Electric (20%) bought Dutch utility company Eneco for €4.1bn ($4.5bn). In February 2024, Chubu Electric and Eneco signed an agreement to acquire 30 per cent of Ecowende, the developers of the Hollandse Kust West Offshore Wind Farm.

In April 2020, the logo mark was renewed. The renewed logo is named "The Beam."

On 18 September 2022, Chubu Electric Power announced that it was a part of an investor consortium led by Japan Industrial Partners seeking to buy Toshiba. Chubu Electric contributed ¥100 billion out of the ¥2 trillion (USD 15.2 billion) valuation.

In May 2022, Chubu Electric bought some stake in Indian solar energy company OMC Power. And in November 2024, Chubu Electric expanded its investment in OMC Power to boost energy transition in India.

In January 2026, the Nuclear Regulation Authority announced it had found that Chubu Electric had fabricated data about earthquake risks at Hamaoka Nuclear Power Plant, and suspended its safety evaluation for a potential plant restart.

== Power Stations ==
The company has 197 separate generating units with a total capacity of 32,828 MW.

=== Hydroelectric ===
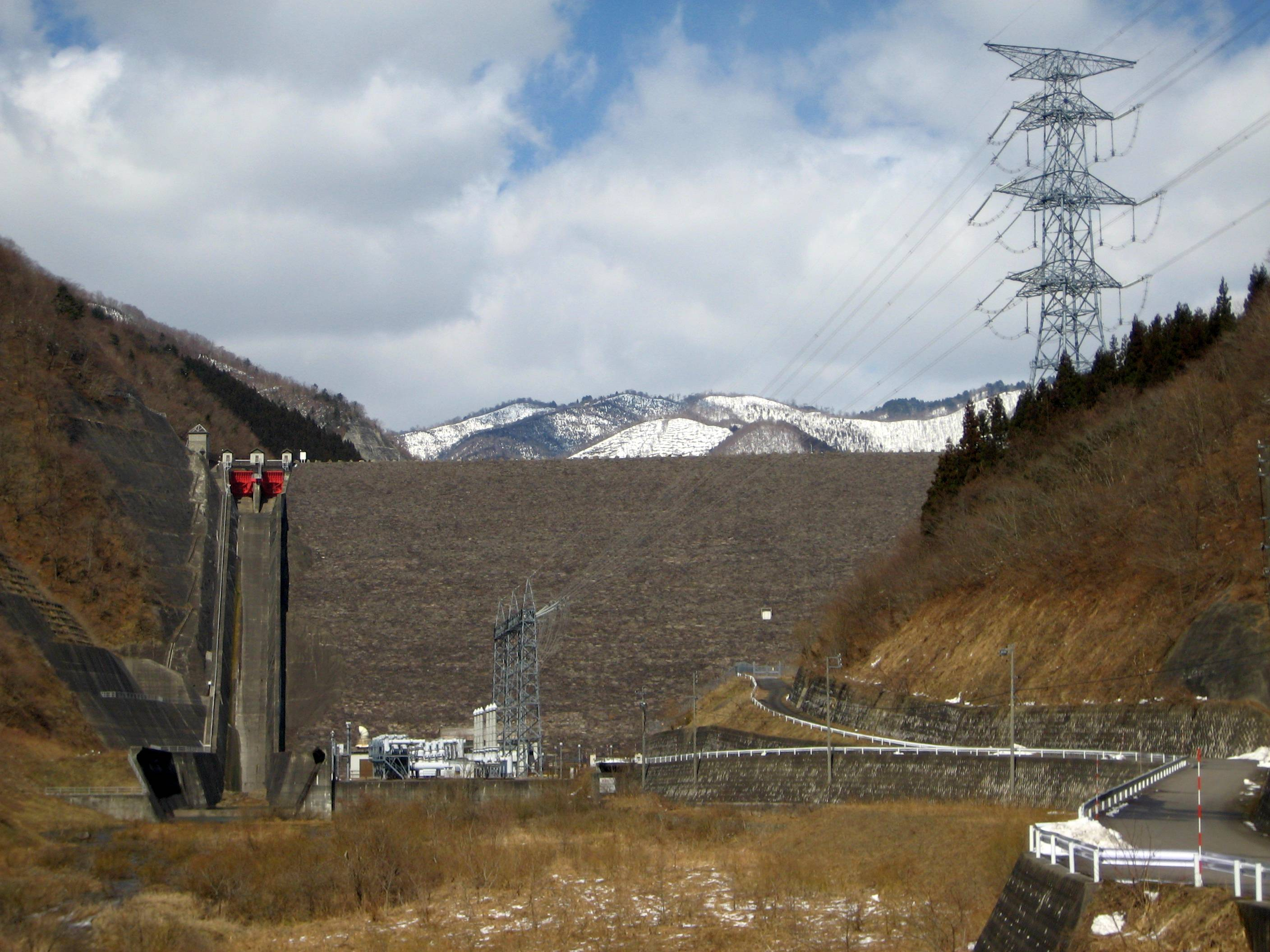
Kamiōsu Dam

The company has 183 separate hydro generating stations with a total capacity of 5,219 MW.

- Iwazu Hydroelectric Generating Station
- Kamiōsu Dam (1,500 MW)
- Takane Dam I (340 MW)
- Takane Dam II (25 MW)
- Kamiasō Dam

=== Thermal power stations ===
The company has 11 separate thermal power stations with a total capacity of 23,969 MW.

- Kawagoe Power Station (Natural Gas, Combined cycle, 4,802 MW)
- Chita Thermal Power Station (Natural Gas,1,708 MW)
- Atsumi Thermal Power Station (crude and heavy oil, 1,400 MW)
- Nishi-Nagoya Thermal Power Station (Natural Gas, 2,376 MW)
- Hekinan Thermal Power Station (Coal, 4,100 MW)
- Shin-Nagoya Thermal Power Station (Natural gas, Combined cycle, 1,458 MW)
- Chita Daini Thermal Power Station (Natural gas, 1,708 MW)
- Taketoyo Thermal Power Station (coal and biomass, 1,070 MW)
- Owase Mita Thermal Power Station (crude and heavy oil, 875 MW)
- Yokkaichi Thermal Power Station (Natural Gas, 1,245 MW)

=== Nuclear power stations ===
- Hamaoka Nuclear Power Plant (3,617 MW)

On 6 May 2011, Prime Minister Naoto Kan requested the Hamaoka Nuclear Power Plant be shut down as an earthquake of magnitude 8.0 or higher is estimated 87% likely to hit the area within the next 30 years. Kan wanted to avoid a possible repeat of the Fukushima I nuclear accidents. On 9 May 2011, Chubu Electric decided to comply with the government request. In June, Chubu Electric received a ¥100 billion ($1.24 billion) loan from the Development Bank of Japan to finance natural gas purchases to make up the shortfall in power caused by the shutdown of Hamaoka. In July 2011, a mayor in Shizuoka Prefecture and a group of residents filed a lawsuit seeking the permanent decommissioning of the reactors at the power plant .

18–20 m breakwater walls were constructed around the nuclear power plant between 2011 and 2013. In January 2024, Chubu Electric president Kingo Hayashi told a news conference that the firm was keen on restarting the Unit No. 4 subject to the completion of environment and safety reviews by the Nuclear Regulation Authority (NRA).

In 2012, Chubu Electric proposed to build dry storage facilities to accommodate the spent fuel that has accumulated in the storage pools that were to be decommissioned.

In August 2021, Chubu Electric reported that fire alarms had been triggered at the suspended Unit No. 5. There were no reported injuries or radiation leak and the company's statement reported that the local fire service confirmed that there was no fire.

=== Other facilities ===
- Higashi-Shimizu Frequency Converter
