= Hida River =

Coordinates: 35°26′46″N 137°03′09″E

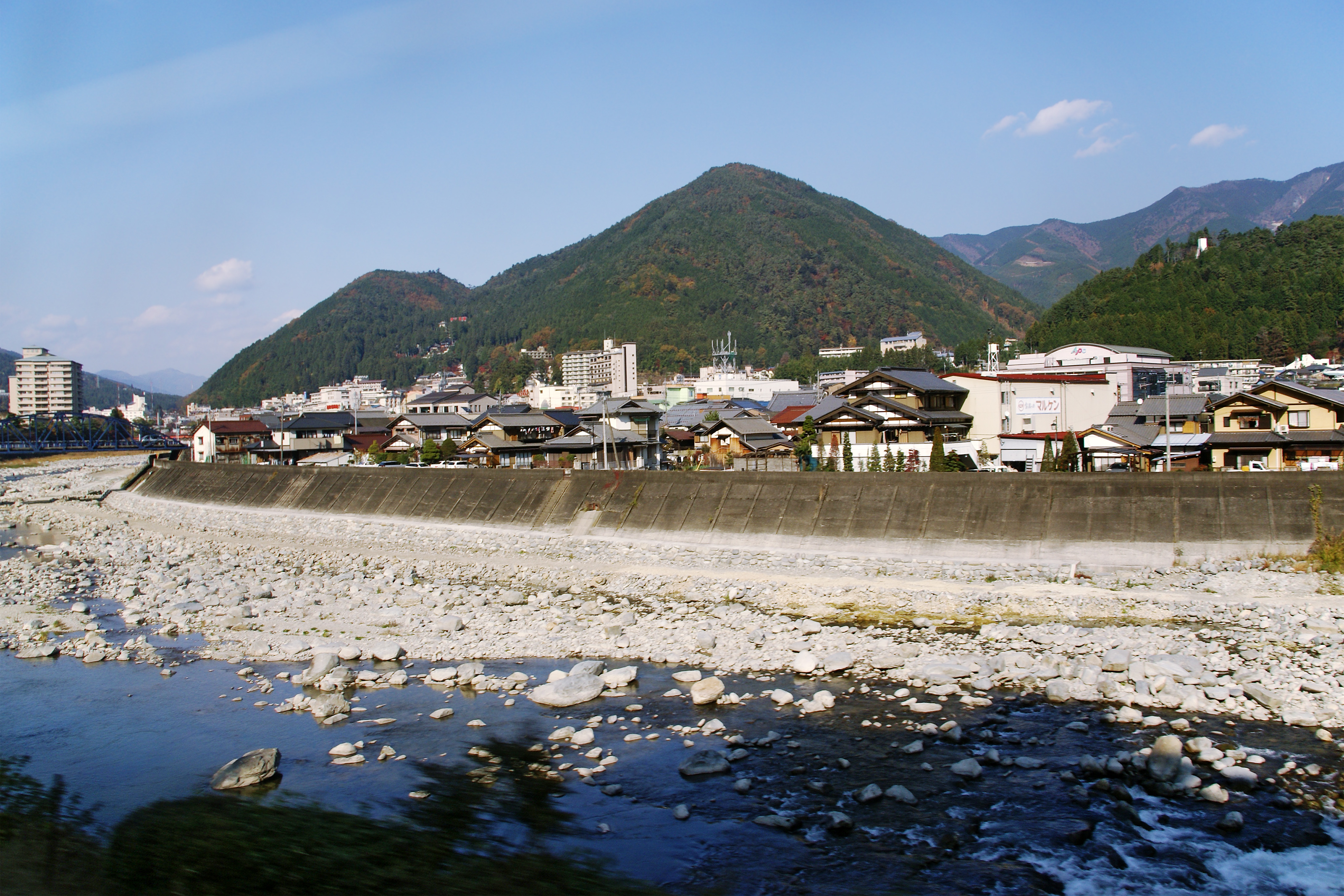
- The Hida River flowing through Gero

- Native name: 飛騨川 (Japanese)

Location
- Country: Japan

Physical characteristics
- Source
  - location: Mount Norikura
  - elevation: 3,026 m (9,928 ft)
- Mouth
  - location: Kiso River
- Length: 148 km (92 mi)
- Basin size: 2,170 km^{2} (840 sq mi)

Basin features
- River system: Kiso River

The Hida River (飛騨川, Hida-gawa) has its source in Mount Norikura (乗鞍岳 Norikura-ga-take) in Takayama, Gifu Prefecture, Japan. It flows from the northern to the southern section of the prefecture before emptying into the Kiso River in Minokamo.

== River communities ==
The river passes through or forms the boundary of the communities listed below.

Gifu Prefecture
Takayama, Gero, Shirakawa (Ōno District), Yaotsu, Hichisō, Kawabe, Minokamo
