= List of dams in Aichi Prefecture =

The following is a list of dams in Aichi Prefecture, Japan.

== List ==
| Name | Location | Started | Opened | Height | Length | Image | DiJ |
|---|---|---|---|---|---|---|---|
| Ameyama Dam | | 1989 | 1995 | 21.5 m (71 ft) | 160 m (520 ft) | | 3042 |
| Banba Dam | | | | 28.6 m (94 ft) | | | 1236 |
| Gamagori Choseichi Dam | | 1977 | 1996 | 43.2 m (142 ft) | 178 m (584 ft) | | 3000 |
| Gokamura-ike Dam | | 1972 | 1974 | 17.7 m (58 ft) | 42 m (138 ft) | | 3442 |
| Habu Dam | | | 1962 | 62.5 m (205 ft) | 398.5 m (1,307 ft) | | 1222 |
| Hattachi Dam | | | 1969 | 22.5 m (74 ft) | 346.5 m (1,137 ft) | | 1223 |
| Iruka-ike Dam | | 1978 | 1991 | 25.7 m (84 ft) | 724.1 m (2,376 ft) | | 1242 |
| Kise Dam | | | | 33 m (108 ft) | | | 3126 |
| Koshido Dam | | 1926 | 1929 | 22.8 m (75 ft) | 120.3 m (395 ft) | | 1199 |
| Kotozawa Choseichi Dam | | 1969 | 1981 | 20.5 m (67 ft) | 128 m (420 ft) | | 1233 |
| Kuroda Dam | | 1973 | 1980 | 45.2 m (148 ft) | | | 1231 |
| Miyoshi-ike Dam | | 1956 | 1958 | 19.7 m (65 ft) | 430 m (1,410 ft) | | 1220 |
| Ohbara Choseichi Dam | | 1977 | 1993 | 47.9 m (157 ft) | 351 m (1,152 ft) | | 1237 |
| Ohi-ike Dam | | 2003 | 2010 | 25.2 m (83 ft) | 145 m (476 ft) | | 1209 |
| Ohno Toshuko Dam | | 1949 | 1961 | 26 m (85 ft) | | | 1225 |
| Ohshima Dam | | 1980 | 2001 | 69.4 m (228 ft) | 160 m (520 ft) | | 1235 |
| Onshi-ike Dam | | 1989 | 1990 | 19.1 m (63 ft) | 115.5 m (379 ft) | | 3655 |
| Sakuma Dam | | Sep 1956 | 23 Apr 1956 | 155.5 m (510 ft) | | | |
| Shintoyone Dam | | 1969 | Aug 1973 | 116.5 m (382 ft) | | | 1229 |
| Shin-ike Dam | | 1988 | 1989 | 15.2 m (50 ft) | 48.5 m (159 ft) | | 3656 |
| Shitara Dam | | 1978 | | 129 m (423 ft) | 380 m (1,250 ft) | | 1240 |
| Sori-ike Dam | | | | | | | |
| Takaraji-ike Dam | | | 1955 | 23.5 m (77 ft) | 198.9 m (653 ft) | | 1218 |
| Togo Choseichi Dam | | | | 31 m (102 ft) | | | 1221 |
| Tominaga Dam | | 1973 | 1980 | 32.5 m (107 ft) | | | 1230 |
| Toyooka-ike Dam | | 1950 | 1954 | 18 m (59 ft) | 110 m (360 ft) | | 1211 |
| Ure Dam | | | | 65 m (213 ft) | | | 1219 |
| Yahagi Dam | | 1962 | 1970 | 100 m (330 ft) | | | 1108 |
| Yahagi No.2 Dam | | 1967 | 1970 | 38 m (125 ft) | 149.2 m (490 ft) | | 1227 |
| Yahata Choseichi Dam | | 1969 | 1986 | 22.7 m (74 ft) | 158 m (518 ft) | | 1232 |
| Yamaguchi Dam (Aichi) | | | | | | | |
| Yanagisawa-ike Dam | | 1989 | 1991 | 16.4 m (54 ft) | 57 m (187 ft) | | 1205 |

== See also ==
- Media related to Dams in Aichi prefecture at Wikimedia Commons
