= Okuyahagi Pumped Storage Power Station =

- Country: Japan
- Location: Toyota, Aichi Prefecture; Ena, Gifu Prefecture
- Coordinates: 35°13′56.03″N 137°25′42.95″E
- Status: Operational
- Operator(s): Chubu Electric Power Company

Upper reservoir
- Total capacity: 9,900,000 m^{3} (8,000 acre⋅ft) (Kuroda Dam lake, effective)

Lower reservoir
- Creates: 80,000,000 m^{3} (65,000 acre⋅ft) (Yahagi Dam reservoir)

Power Station
- Hydraulic head: Okuyahagi 1: 161 m (528 ft); Okuyahagi 2: 404 m (1,325 ft)
- Pump-generators: 3 x 116 MW reversible Francis turbines (Okuyahagi 1); 3 x 260 MW reversible Francis turbines (Okuyahagi 2); 2 x 31 MW Francis turbines (Yahagi 1); 1 x 32 MW Francis turbine (Yahagi 2)
- Installed capacity: 1,160 MW (1,560,000 hp)

The Okuyahagi Pumped Storage Power Station (Japanese: 奥矢作発電所, Hepburn: Okuyahagi Hatsudensho) is a group of large pumped-storage hydroelectric power plants and smaller conventional plants located in Toyota, Aichi Prefecture, and Ena, Gifu Prefecture, Japan. With a combined installed capacity of 1,160 megawatts (1,560,000 hp), it is among the largest pumped-storage power stations in Japan.

The facilities are run by the Chubu Electric Power Company. The station includes 4 distinct power plants. The first two power plants, Yahagi 1 and 2 are conventional power plants. The other two plants, Okuyahagi 1 and 2 are pumped-storage plants. Yahagi 1 uses water from the Yahagi Dam (矢作ダム) and has a capacity of 60 MW. Yahagi 2 uses water from the Second Yahagi Dam (矢作第二ダム), a smaller dam downstream of the main one, and has a capacity of 31.2 MW.

The pumped-storage station has an unconventional configuration, with three reservoirs at different heights. The lower reservoir is created by Yahagi Dam on the Yahagi river. The upper reservoir is the Kuroda Dam lake, an artificial lake created by the Kuroda Dam. A third reservoir, in between the two at an intermediate elevation is formed by the Tominaga Dam. The two Okuyahagi power stations work in tandem between the three reservoirs. This configuration was necessary because of the geological conditions in the area, with a fault that prevented the safe construction of a single connection between upper and lower reservoirs. Okuyahagi 1 is the upper power plant, operating between the upper and the intermediate reservoir using 3 units with a combined capacity of 323 MW. The first unit started operation in September 1980, while the second and third units became operational in February 1981. The Okuyahagi 2 is the lower power plant operating between the intermediate reservoir and the lower reservoir employing 3 units with a combined capacity of 780 MW. Okuyahagi 2 became operational together with the first plant, with the first unit online in September 1980 and the other 2 in February 1981. The two plants operate as a single power station. Both station have a maximum water flow rate of 234 cubic meter per second.

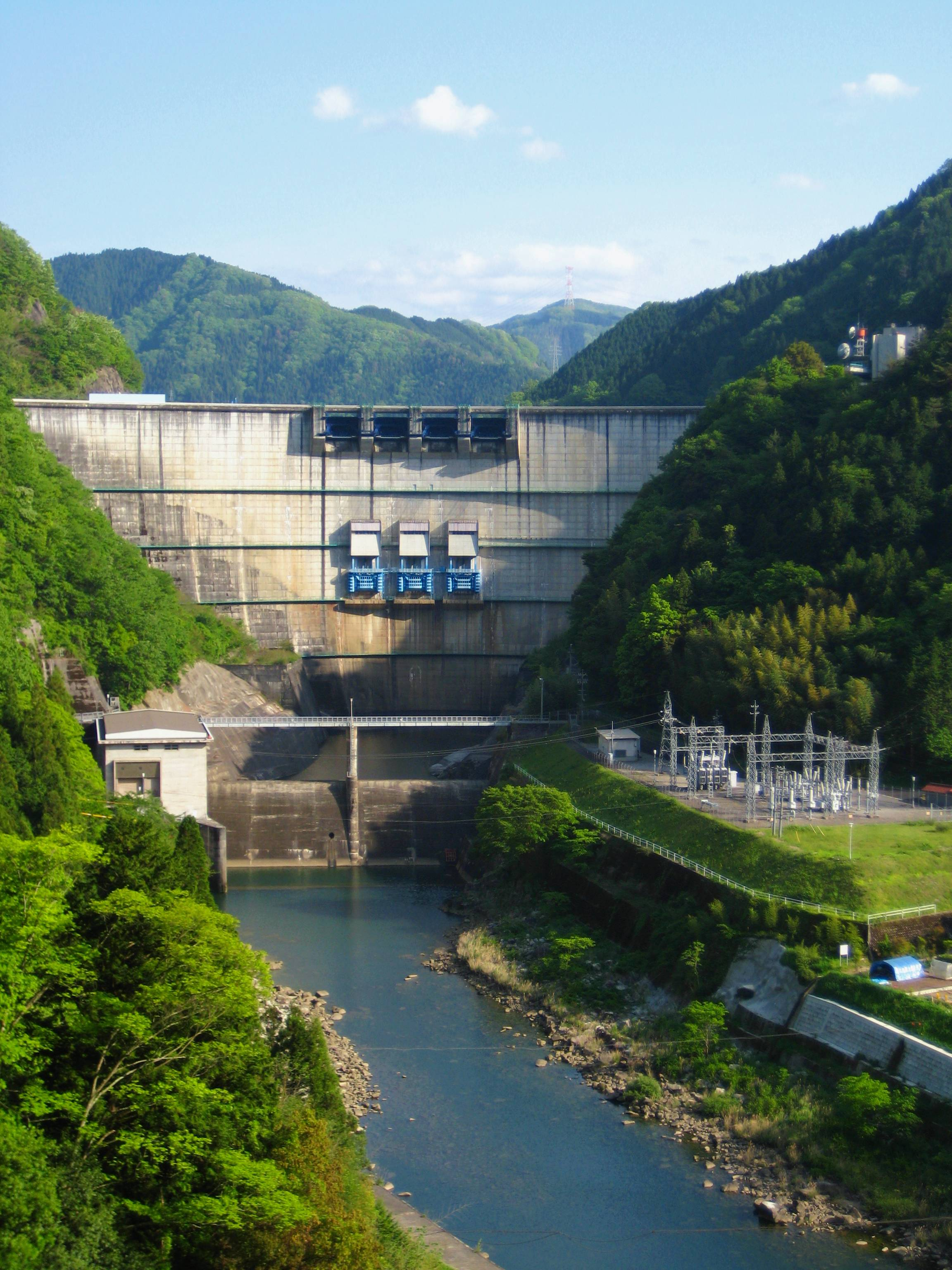
Yahagi Dam

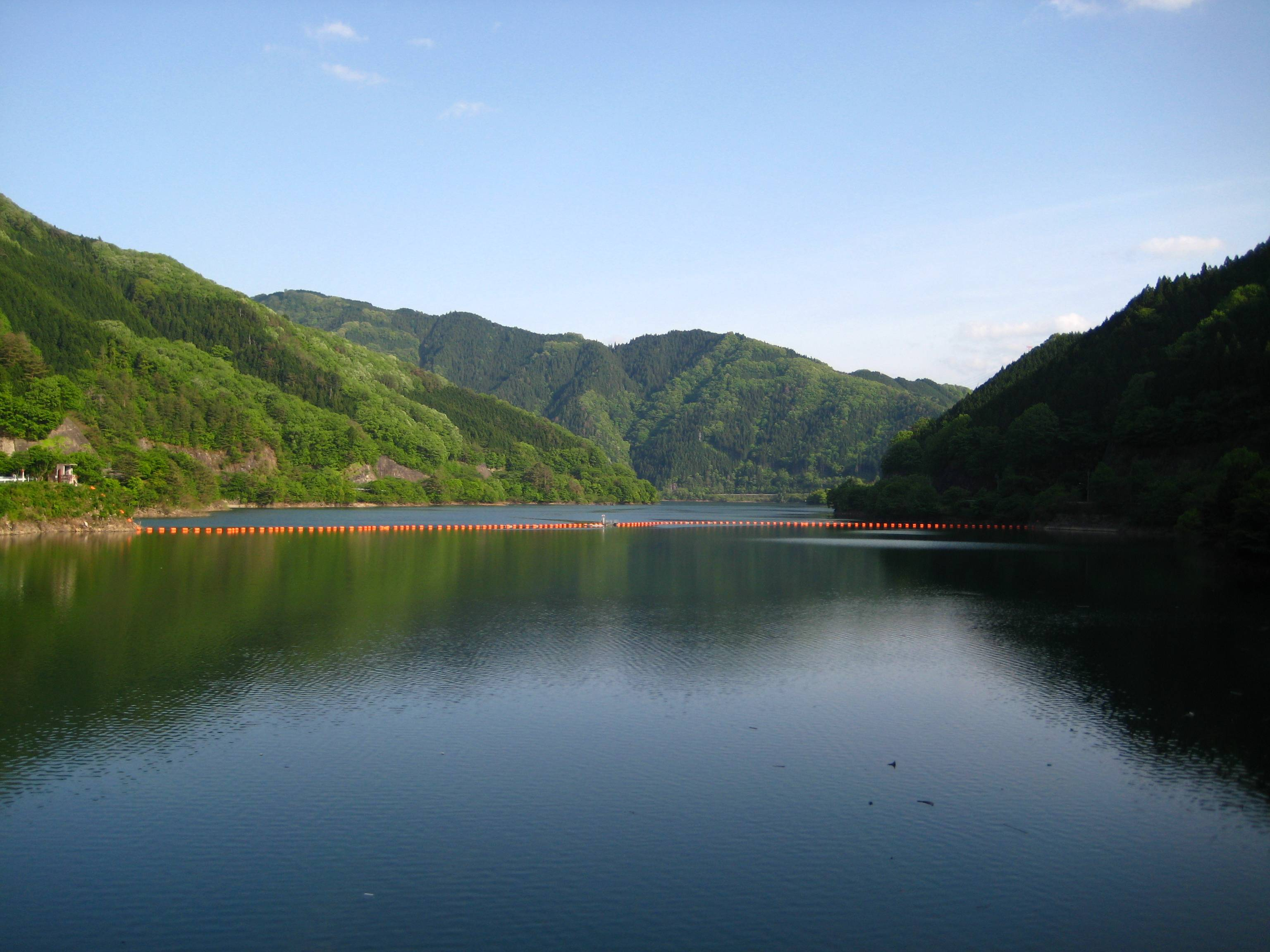
Yahagi Dam lake (lower reservoir)

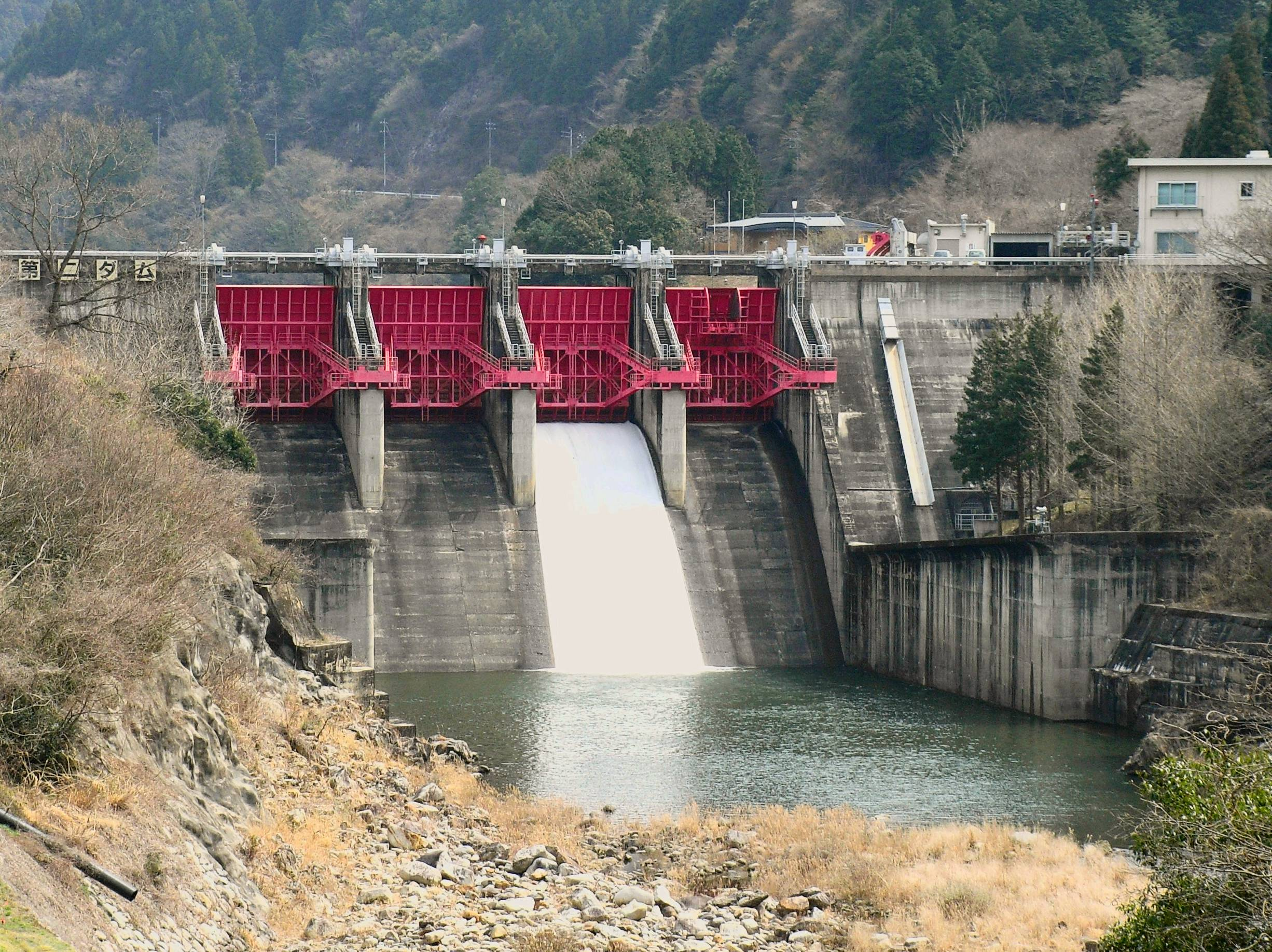
Second Yahagi Dam

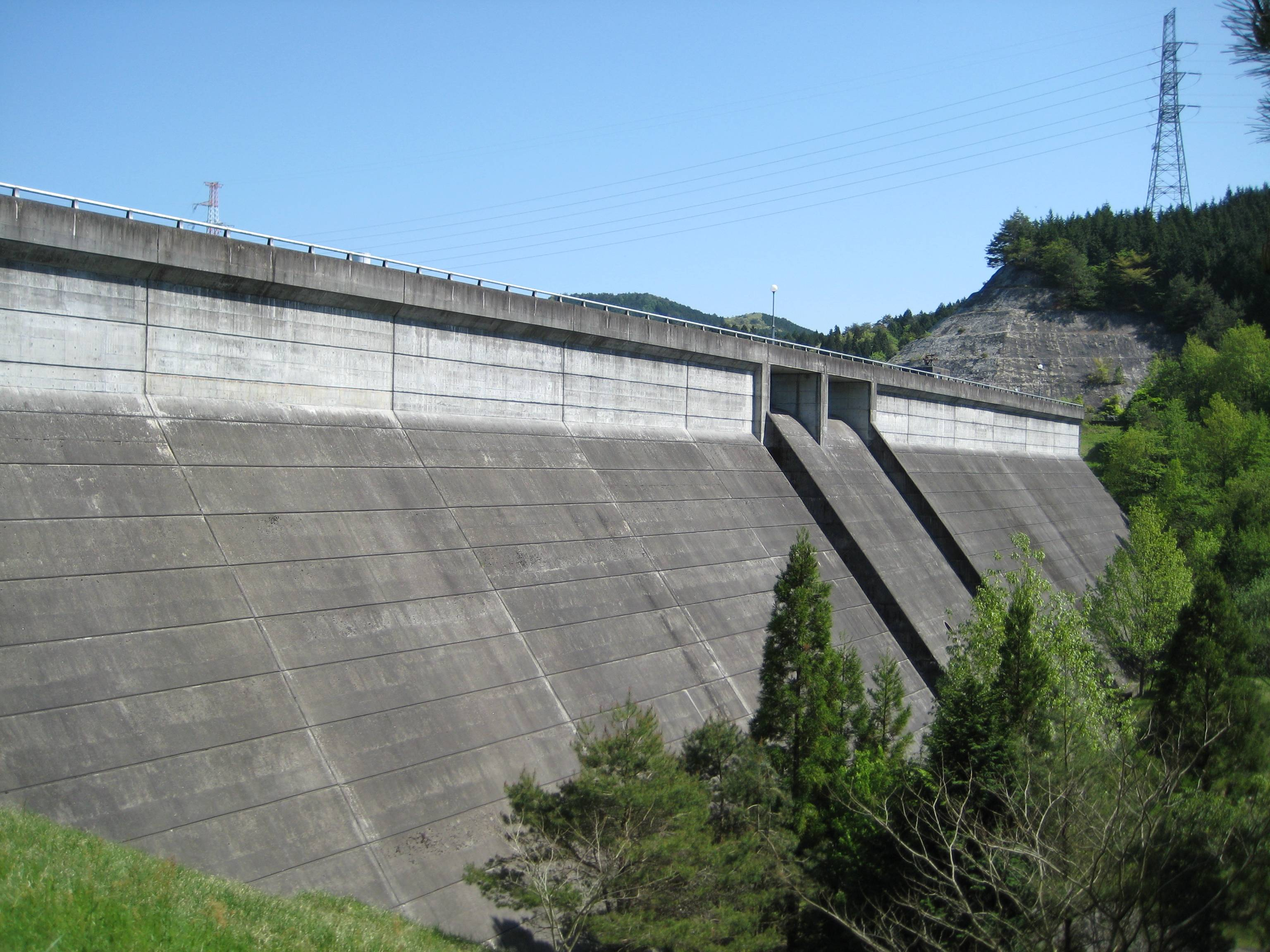
Tominaga Dam (intermediate reservoir)

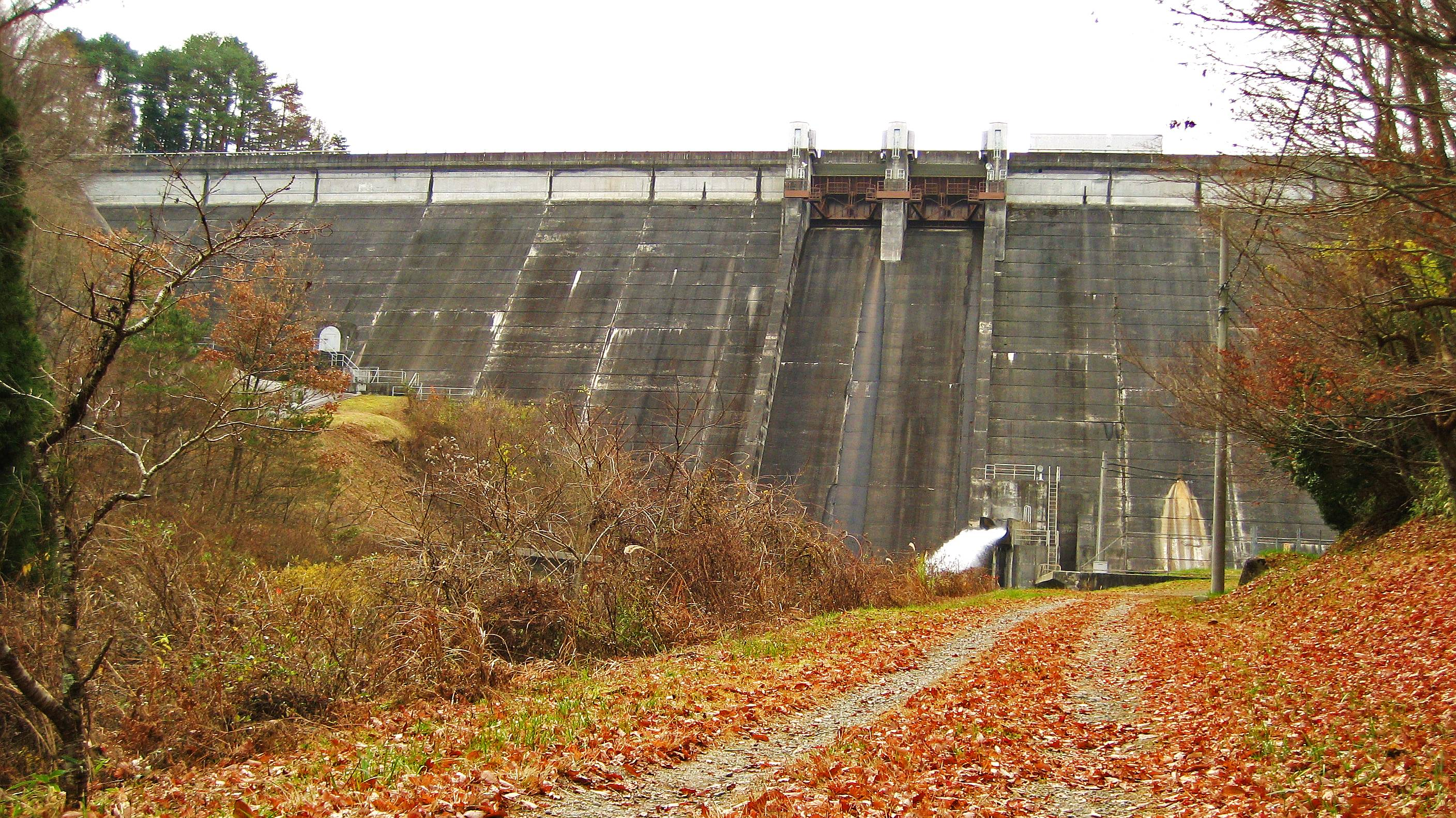
Kuroda Dam (upper reservoir)

== See also ==
- List of power stations in Japan
- Hydroelectricity in Japan
- List of pumped-storage hydroelectric power stations
