= Yahagi No.2 Dam =

Dam in Aichi Prefecture, Japan

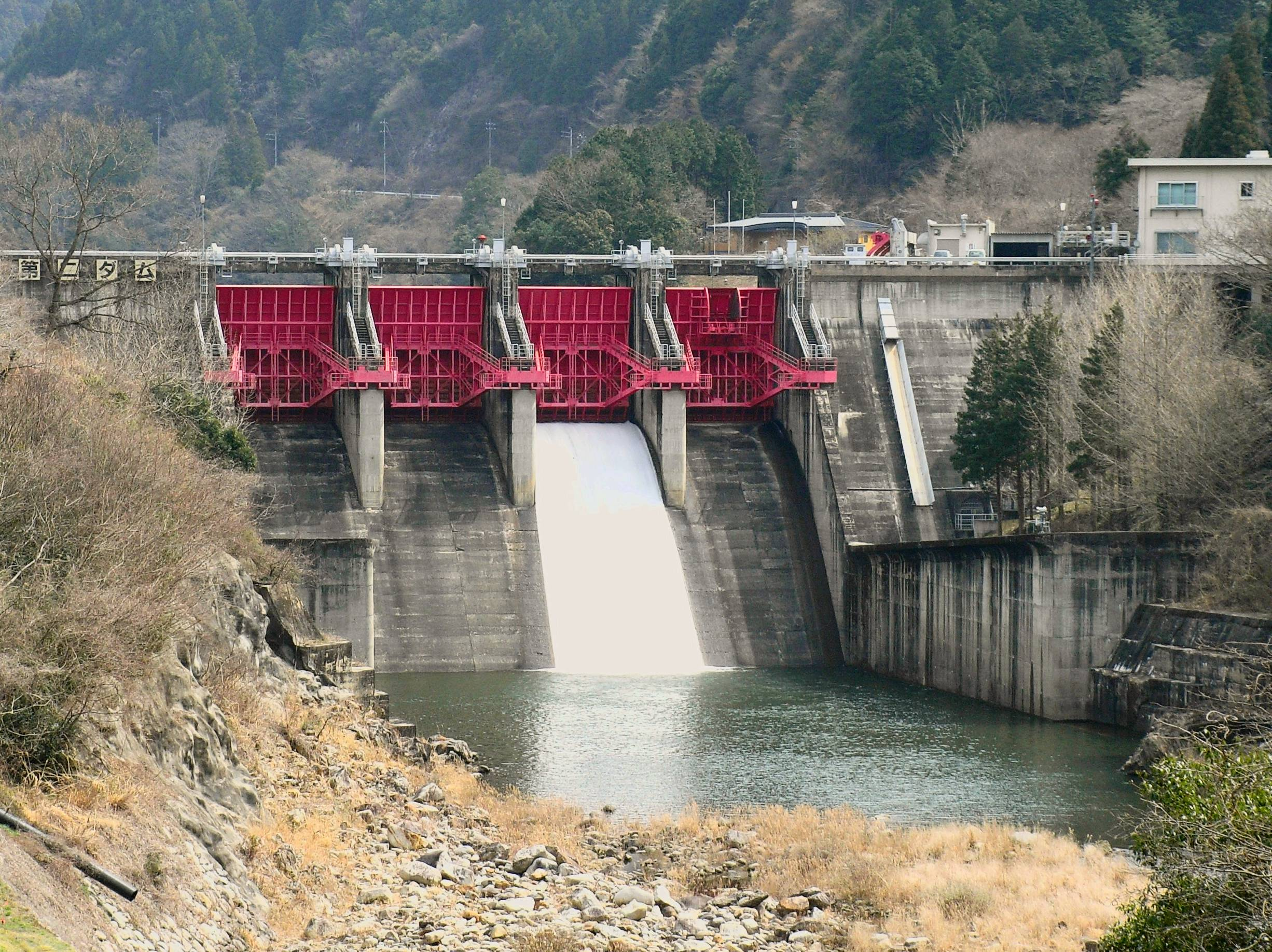

- Location within Japan
- Location: Aichi Prefecture, Japan
- Coordinates: 35°14′24″N 137°23′27″E
- Construction began: 1967
- Opening date: 1970

Dam and spillways
- Height: 38 m (125 ft)
- Length: 149.2 m (490 ft)

Reservoir
- Total capacity: 4,354,000 m^{3} (153,800,000 cu ft)
- Catchment area: 514.2 km^{2} (198.5 sq mi)
- Surface area: 37 hectares (91 acres)

Yahagi No.2 Dam is a gravity dam located in Aichi Prefecture in Japan. The dam is used for power production. The catchment area of the dam is 514.2 km^{2}. The dam impounds about 37 ha of land when full and can store 4354 thousand cubic meters of water. The construction of the dam was started on 1967 and completed in 1970.

== See also ==
- Yahagi Dam
