= Ameyama Dam =

Dam in Aichi Prefecture, Japan

- Location within Japan
- Interactive map of Ameyama Dam
- Location: Aichi Prefecture, Japan
- Coordinates: 34°53′41″N 137°23′16″E
- Construction began: 1989
- Opening date: 1995

Dam and spillways
- Height: 21.5 m (71 ft)
- Length: 160 m (520 ft)

Reservoir
- Total capacity: 251 thousand cubic meters
- Catchment area: 2.6 sq. km
- Surface area: 4 hectares

Ameyama Dam (雨山ダム) is a gravity dam located in Aichi Prefecture in Japan. The dam is used for flood control and water supply. The catchment area of the dam is 2.6 km^{2}. The dam impounds about 4 ha of land when full and can store 251 thousand cubic meters of water. The construction of the dam was started on 1989 and completed in 1995.
