= Kotozawa Choseichi Dam =

Dam in Aichi Prefecture, Japan

- Location within Japan
- Location: Aichi Prefecture, Japan
- Coordinates: 34°51′06″N 137°8′46″E
- Construction began: 1969
- Opening date: 1981

Dam and spillways
- Height: 20.5 m (67 ft)
- Length: 128 m (420 ft)

Reservoir
- Total capacity: 74 thousand cubic meters
- Catchment area: 0.2 sq. km
- Surface area: 1 hectares

Kotozawa Choseichi Dam (琴沢調整池) is a rockfill dam located in Aichi Prefecture in Japan. The dam is used for irrigation. The catchment area of the dam is 0.2 km^{2}. The dam impounds about 1 ha of land when full and can store 74 thousand cubic meters of water. The construction of the dam was started on 1969 and completed in 1981.
