= Shitara Dam =

Dam in Aichi Prefecture, Japan

- Location within Japan
- Location: Aichi Prefecture, Japan
- Coordinates: 35°5′25″N 137°33′09″E
- Construction began: 1978

Dam and spillways
- Height: 129 m (423 ft)
- Length: 380 m (1,250 ft)

Reservoir
- Total capacity: 98,000,000 m^{3} (3.5×10^{9} cu ft)
- Catchment area: 62.2 km^{2} (24.0 sq mi)
- Surface area: 300 hectares (740 acres)

Shitara Dam is an under construction gravity dam located in Aichi Prefecture in Japan. The dam is used for flood control, irrigation and water supply. The catchment area of the dam is 62.2 km^{2}. The dam impounds about 300 ha of land when full and can store 98000 thousand cubic meters of water. The construction of the dam was started on 1978.
