= Takaraji-ike Dam =

Dam in Aichi Prefecture, Japan

- Location within Japan
- Location: Aichi Prefecture, Japan
- Coordinates: 34°52′58″N 137°24′52″E
- Opening date: 1955

Dam and spillways
- Height: 23.5 m (77 ft)
- Length: 198.9 m (653 ft)

Reservoir
- Total capacity: 290,000 m^{3} (10,000,000 cu ft)
- Catchment area: 1.1 km^{2} (0.42 sq mi)
- Surface area: 4 hectares (9.9 acres)

Takaraji-ike Dam is an earthfill dam located in Aichi Prefecture in Japan. The dam is used for irrigation. The catchment area of the dam is 1.1 km^{2}. The dam impounds about 4 ha of land when full and can store 290 thousand cubic meters of water. The construction of the dam was started on and completed in 1955.
