= Ohbara Choseichi Dam =

Dam in Aichi Prefecture, Japan

Ohbara Choseichi
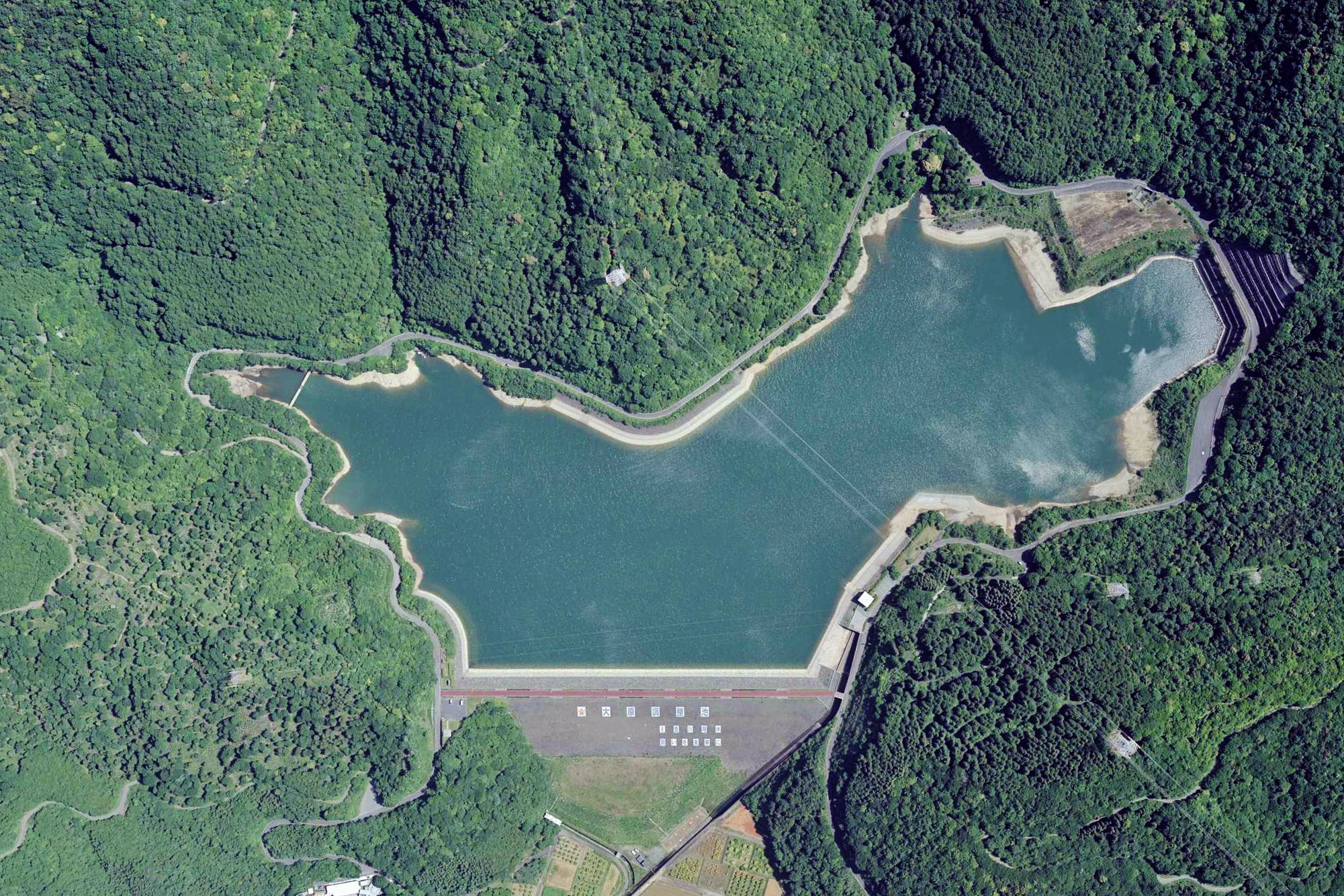

- Location within Japan
- Location: Aichi Prefecture, Japan
- Coordinates: 34°50′26″N 137°29′44″E
- Construction began: 1977
- Opening date: 1993

Dam and spillways
- Height: 47.9 m (157 ft)
- Length: 351 m (1,152 ft)

Reservoir
- Total capacity: 2,020,000 m^{3} (71,000,000 cu ft)
- Catchment area: 1.9 km^{2} (0.73 sq mi)
- Surface area: 18 hectares (44 acres)

Ohbara Choseichi is a rockfill dam located in Aichi Prefecture in Japan. The dam is used for irrigation and water supply. The catchment area of the dam is 1.9 km^{2}. The dam impounds about 18 ha of land when full and can store 2020 thousand cubic meters of water. The construction of the dam was started on 1977 and completed in 1993.
