= Yanagisawa-ike Dam =

Dam in Aichi Prefecture, Japan

- Location within Japan
- Location: Aichi Prefecture, Japan
- Coordinates: 35°12′12″N 137°11′20″E
- Construction began: 1989
- Opening date: 1991

Dam and spillways
- Height: 16.4 m (54 ft)
- Length: 57 m (187 ft)

Reservoir
- Total capacity: 30,000 m^{3} (1,100,000 cu ft)
- Catchment area: 0.1 km^{2} (0.039 sq mi)
- Surface area: 1 hectare (2.5 acres)

Yanagisawa-ike Dam is an earthfill dam located in Aichi Prefecture in Japan. The dam is used for irrigation. The catchment area of the dam is 0.1 km^{2}. The dam impounds about 1 ha of land when full and can store 30 thousand cubic meters of water. The construction of the dam was started on 1989 and completed in 1991.
