= Toyooka-ike Dam =

Dam in Aichi Prefecture, Japan

- Location within Japan
- Location: Aichi Prefecture, Japan
- Coordinates: 34°49′54″N 137°15′51″E
- Construction began: 1950
- Opening date: 1954

Dam and spillways
- Height: 18 m (59 ft)
- Length: 110 m (360 ft)

Reservoir
- Total capacity: 100,000 m^{3} (3,500,000 cu ft)
- Catchment area: 0.8 km^{2} (0.31 sq mi)
- Surface area: 2 hectares (4.9 acres)

Toyooka-ike Dam is an earthfill dam located in Aichi Prefecture in Japan. The dam is used for irrigation. The catchment area of the dam is 0.8 km^{2}. The dam impounds about 2 ha of land when full and can store 100 thousand cubic meters of water. The construction of the dam was started on 1950 and completed in 1954.
