= Habu Dam =

Dam in Aichi Prefecture, Japan

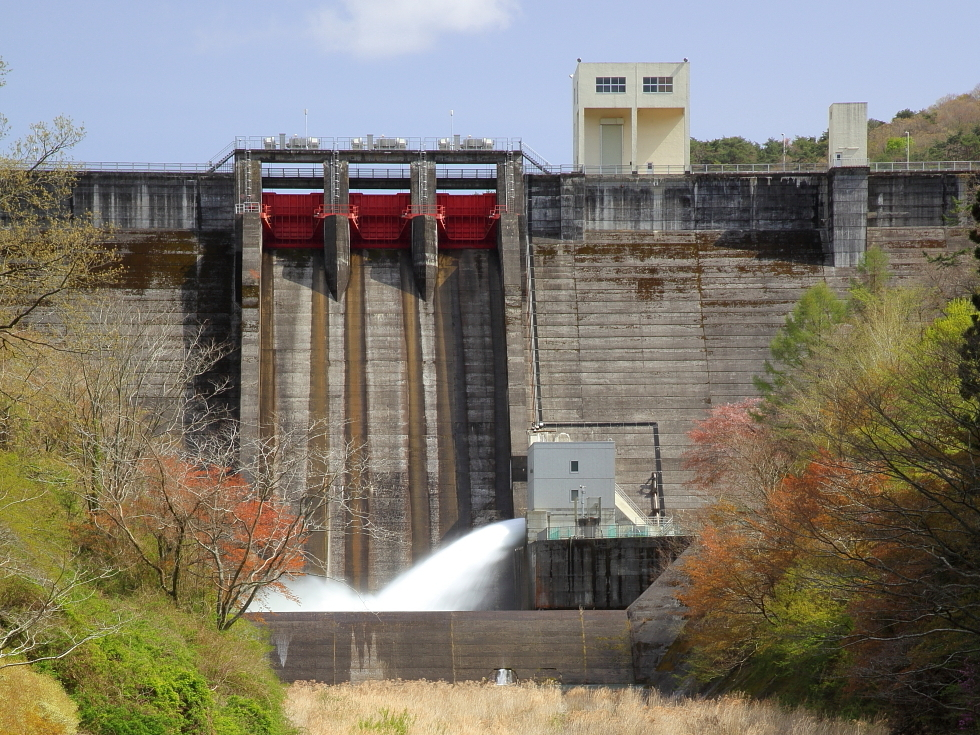

- Location within Japan
- Location: Aichi Prefecture, Japan
- Coordinates: 35°2′06″N 137°23′53″E
- Opening date: 1962

Dam and spillways
- Height: 62.5 m (205 ft)
- Length: 398.5 m (1,307 ft)

Reservoir
- Total capacity: 19363 thousand cubic meters
- Catchment area: 51.3 sq. km
- Surface area: 107 hectares

Habu Dam(羽布ダム) is a gravity dam located in Aichi Prefecture in Japan. The dam is used for irrigation. The catchment area of the dam is 51.3 km^{2}. The dam impounds about 107 ha of land when full and can store 19363 thousand cubic meters of water. The construction of the dam was completed in 1962.
