= Hattachi-ike Dam =

Dam in Aichi Prefecture, Japan

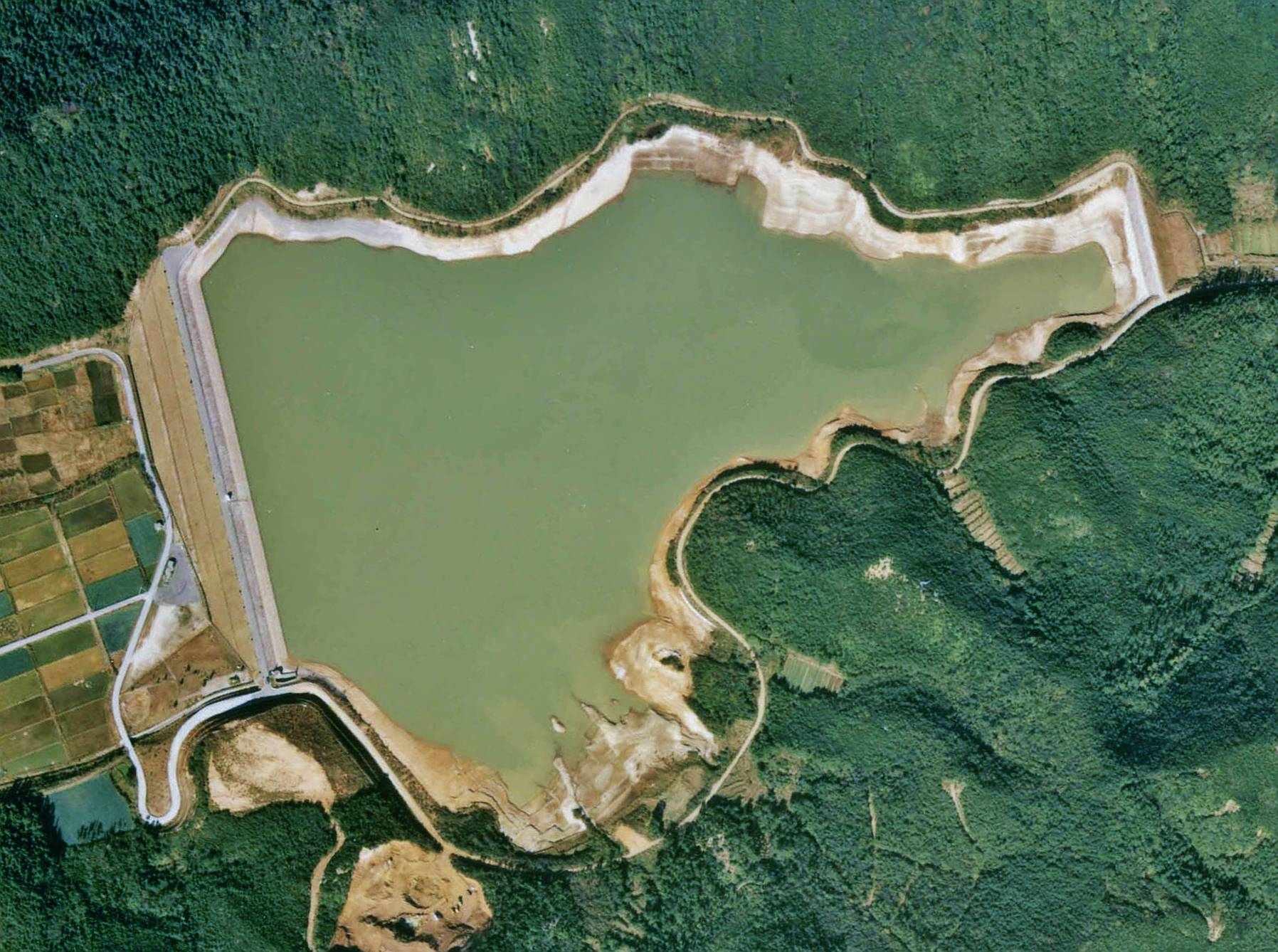

- Location within Japan
- Interactive map of Hattachi-ike Dam
- Location: Aichi Prefecture, Japan
- Coordinates: 34°35′49″N 137°3′23″E
- Opening date: 1969

Dam and spillways
- Height: 22.5 m (74 ft)
- Length: 346.5 m (1,137 ft)

Reservoir
- Total capacity: 1700 thousand cubic meters
- Catchment area: 0.7 sq. km
- Surface area: 22 hectares

Hattachi-ike Dam (初立池) is an earthfill dam located in Aichi Prefecture in Japan. The dam is used for irrigation. The catchment area of the dam is 0.7 km^{2}. The dam impounds about 22 ha of land when full and can store 1700 thousand cubic meters of water. The construction of the dam was completed in 1969.
