= Ohshima Dam =

Dam in Aichi Prefecture, Japan

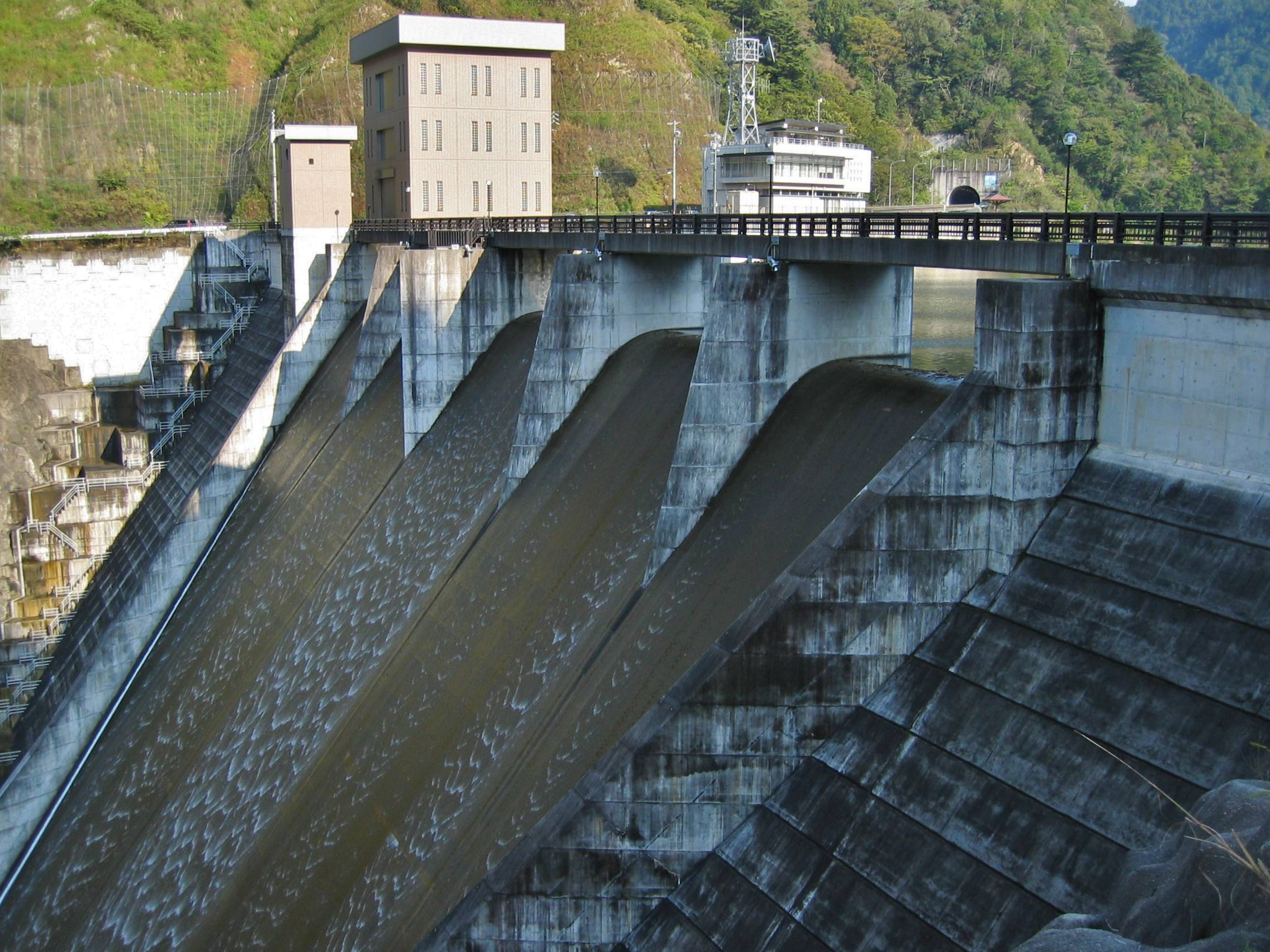

- Location within Japan
- Location: Aichi Prefecture, Japan
- Coordinates: 34°59′02″N 137°39′51″E
- Construction began: 1980
- Opening date: 2001

Dam and spillways
- Height: 69.4 m (228 ft)
- Length: 160 m (520 ft)

Reservoir
- Total capacity: 12,300,000 m^{3} (430,000,000 cu ft)
- Catchment area: 18.4 km^{2} (7.1 sq mi)
- Surface area: 50 hectares (120 acres)

Ohshima Dam is a gravity dam located in Aichi Prefecture in Japan. The dam is used for irrigation and water supply. The catchment area of the dam is 18.4 km^{2}. The dam impounds about 50 ha of land when full and can store 12300 thousand cubic meters of water. The construction of the dam was started on 1980 and completed in 2001.

The height of the dam is 69.4 meters, with a crest length of 160 meters and a dam volume of 183 thousand m^{3.}
