= Onshi-ike Dam =

Dam in Aichi Prefecture, Japan

Onshi-ike
- Location within Japan
- Location: Aichi Prefecture, Japan
- Coordinates: 34°56′47″N 137°12′59″E
- Construction began: 1989
- Opening date: 1990

Dam and spillways
- Height: 19.1 m (63 ft)
- Length: 115.5 m (379 ft)

Reservoir
- Total capacity: 111,000 m^{3} (3,900,000 cu ft)
- Catchment area: 0.2 km^{2} (0.077 sq mi)
- Surface area: 2 hectares (4.9 acres)

Onshi-ike is an earthfill dam located in Aichi Prefecture in Japan. The dam is used for irrigation. The catchment area of the dam is 0.2 square kilometres (0.077 mi^{2}). The dam impounds about 2 ha of land when full and can store 111 thousand cubic meters of water. The construction of the dam was started on 1989 and completed in 1990.
