= Yahata Choseichi Dam =

Dam in Aichi Prefecture, Japan

- Location within Japan
- Location: Aichi Prefecture, Japan
- Coordinates: 34°48′45″N 137°6′49″E
- Construction began: 1969
- Opening date: 1986

Dam and spillways
- Height: 22.7 m (74 ft)
- Length: 158 m (518 ft)

Reservoir
- Total capacity: 66,000 m^{3} (2,300,000 cu ft)
- Catchment area: 0.7 km^{2} (0.27 sq mi)
- Surface area: 2 hectares (4.9 acres)

Yahata Choseichi Dam is a rockfill dam located in Aichi Prefecture in Japan. The dam is used for irrigation. The catchment area of the dam is 0.7 km^{2}. The dam impounds about 2 ha of land when full and can store 66 thousand cubic meters of water. The construction of the dam was started on 1969 and completed in 1986.
