= Ohi-ike Dam =

Dam in Aichi Prefecture, Japan

Ohi-ike
- Location within Japan
- Location: Aichi Prefecture, Japan
- Coordinates: 34°52′43″N 137°11′56″E
- Construction began: 2003
- Opening date: 2010

Dam and spillways
- Height: 25.2 m (83 ft)
- Length: 145 m (476 ft)

Reservoir
- Total capacity: 901,000 m^{3} (31,800,000 cu ft)
- Catchment area: 2 km^{2} (0.77 sq mi)
- Surface area: 9 hectares (22 acres)

Ohi-ike is an earthfill dam located in Aichi Prefecture in Japan. The dam is used for irrigation. The catchment area of the dam is 2 km^{2}. The dam impounds about 9 ha of land when full and can store 901 thousand cubic meters of water. The construction of the dam was started on 2003 and completed in 2010.
