= Miyoshi-ike Dam =

Dam in Aichi Prefecture, Japan

Miyoshi-ike
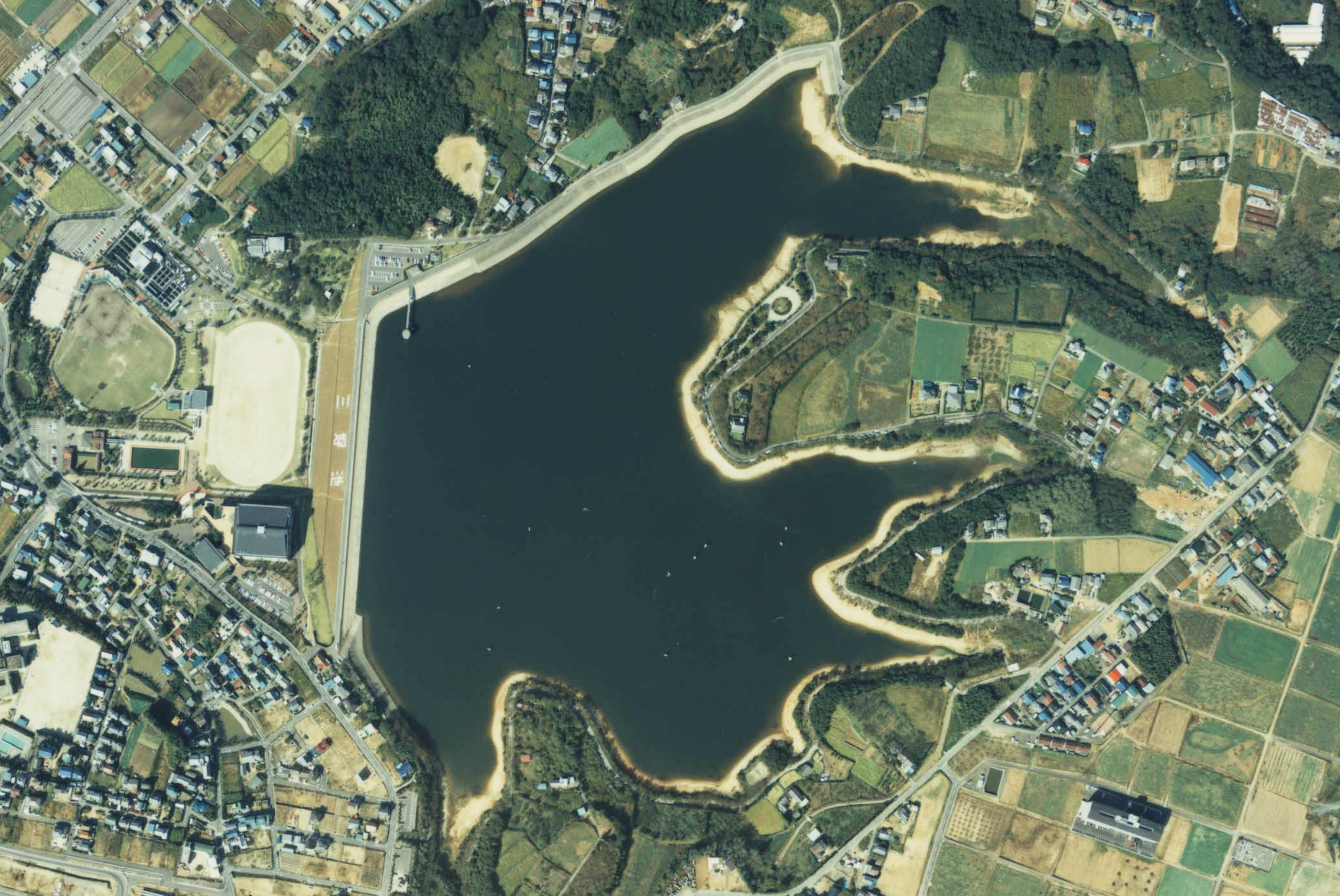

- Location within Japan
- Location: Aichi Prefecture, Japan
- Coordinates: 35°5′31″N 137°5′24″E
- Construction began: 1956
- Opening date: 1958

Dam and spillways
- Height: 19.7 m (65 ft)
- Length: 430 m (1,410 ft)

Reservoir
- Total capacity: 2235 thousand cubic meters
- Catchment area: 0.8 sq. km
- Surface area: 41 hectares

Miyoshi-ike (三好池) is an earthfill dam located in Aichi Prefecture, Japan. The dam is used for irrigation. The catchment area of the dam is 0.8 km^{2} (0.31 sq mi). The dam impounds about 41 hectares (100 acres) of land when full and can store 2,235,000 m^{3} (590,000,000 U.S. gal) of water. The construction of the dam was started on 1956 and completed in 1958.
