= Koshido Dam =

Dam in Aichi Prefecture, Japan

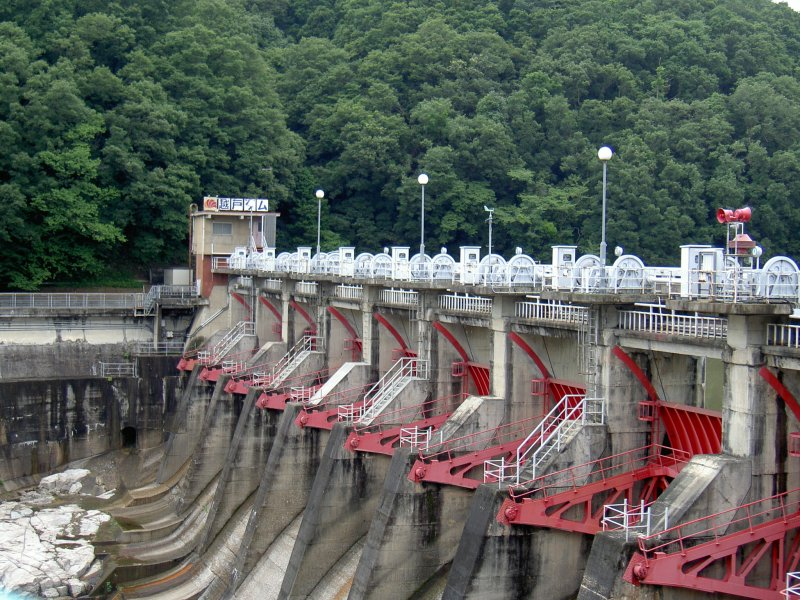

- Location within Japan
- Location: Aichi Prefecture, Japan
- Coordinates: 35°7′18″N 137°11′55″E
- Construction began: 1926
- Opening date: 1929

Dam and spillways
- Height: 22.8 m (75 ft)
- Length: 120.3 m (395 ft)

Reservoir
- Total capacity: 2876 thousand cubic meters
- Catchment area: 900.8 sq. km
- Surface area: 48 hectares

Koshido Dam (越戸ダム) is a gravity dam located in Aichi Prefecture in Japan. The dam is used for power production. The catchment area of the dam is 900.8 km^{2}. The dam impounds about 48 ha of land when full and can store 2876 thousand cubic meters of water. The construction of the dam was started on 1926 and completed in 1929.
