= Gamagori Choseichi Dam =

Dam in Aichi Prefecture, Japan

- Location within Japan
- Interactive map of Gamagori Choseichi Dam
- Location: Aichi Prefecture, Japan
- Coordinates: 34°49′54″N 137°15′51″E
- Construction began: 1977
- Opening date: 1996

Dam and spillways
- Height: 43.2 m (142 ft)
- Length: 178 m (584 ft)

Reservoir
- Total capacity: 612 thousand cubic meters
- Catchment area: 0.8 sq. km
- Surface area: 5 hectares

Gamagori Choseichi Dam(蒲郡調整池) is a rockfill dam located in Aichi Prefecture in Japan. The dam is used for irrigation and water supply. The catchment area of the dam is 0.8 km^{2}. The dam impounds about 5 ha of land when full and can store 612 thousand cubic meters of water. The construction of the dam was started on 1977 and completed in 1996.
