= Gokamura-ike Dam =

Dam in Aichi Prefecture, Japan

- Location within Japan
- Interactive map of Gokamura-ike Dam
- Location: Aichi Prefecture, Japan
- Coordinates: 35°19′46″N 137°3′03″E
- Construction began: 1972
- Opening date: 1974

Dam and spillways
- Height: 17.7 m (58 ft)
- Length: 42 m (138 ft)

Reservoir
- Total capacity: 105 thousand cubic meters
- Catchment area: 0.6 sq. km
- Surface area: 2 hectares

Gokamura-ike Dam (五ヶ村池) is an earthfill dam located in Aichi Prefecture in Japan. The dam is used for irrigation. The catchment area of the dam is 0.6 km^{2}. The dam impounds about 2 ha of land when full and can store 105 thousand cubic meters of water. The construction of the dam was started on 1972 and completed in 1974.
