= Ure Dam =

Dam in Aichi Prefecture, Japan

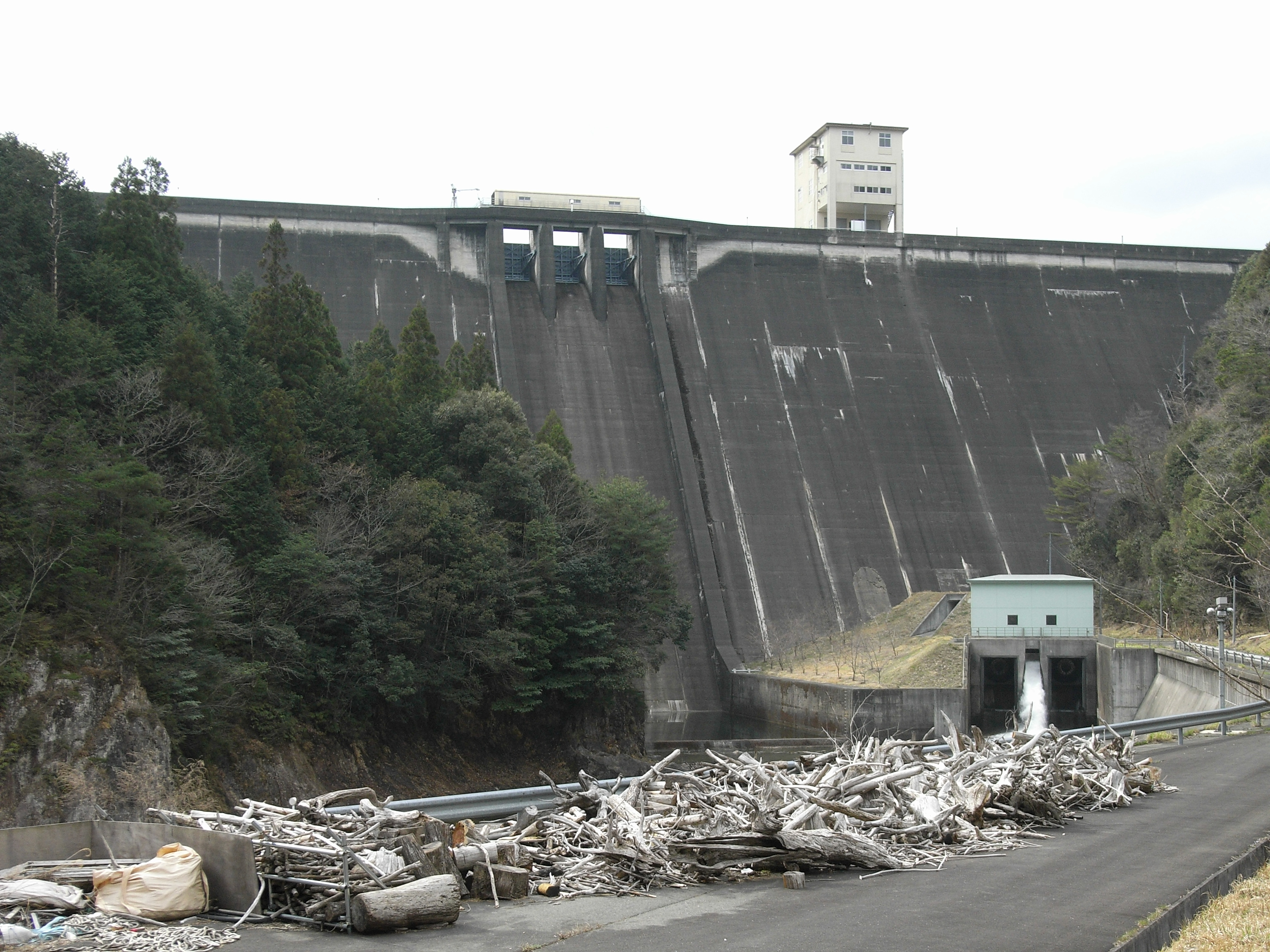
- Interactive map of Ure Dam
- Location: Aichi Prefecture, Japan.
- Coordinates: 35.0089°N 137.649°E

Dam and spillways
- Impounds: Ure River

Ure Dam is a gravity dam in the Aichi Prefecture of Japan. 6 houses were flooded in the building of the dam.
