= Kuroda Dam =

Dam in Toyota, Aichi, Japan

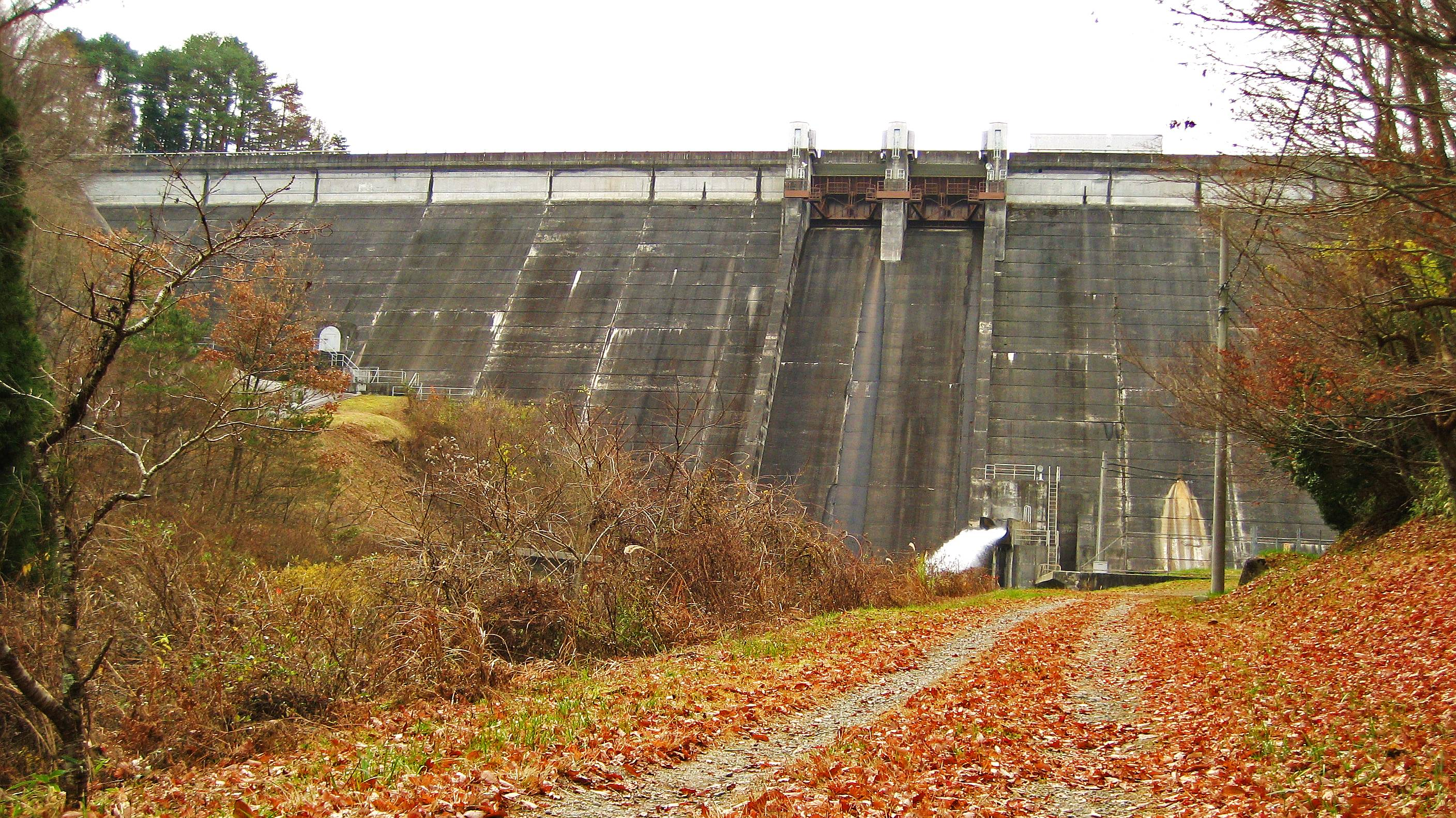
- Interactive map of Kuroda Dam
- Location: Toyota, Aichi Prefecture, Japan.
- Coordinates: 35°11′14″N 137°28′34″E
- Construction began: 1973
- Opening date: 1980

Dam and spillways
- Height: 45.2 m
- Length: 332.0 m

Reservoir
- Total capacity: 11,050,000 m^{3}
- Catchment area: 7.65 km^{2}
- Surface area: 82 hectares

The Kuroda Dam (黒田ダム) is a dam in the city of Toyota in the Aichi Prefecture of Japan. It is used for power generation, and as part of a pump storage energy facility.

== Gallery ==
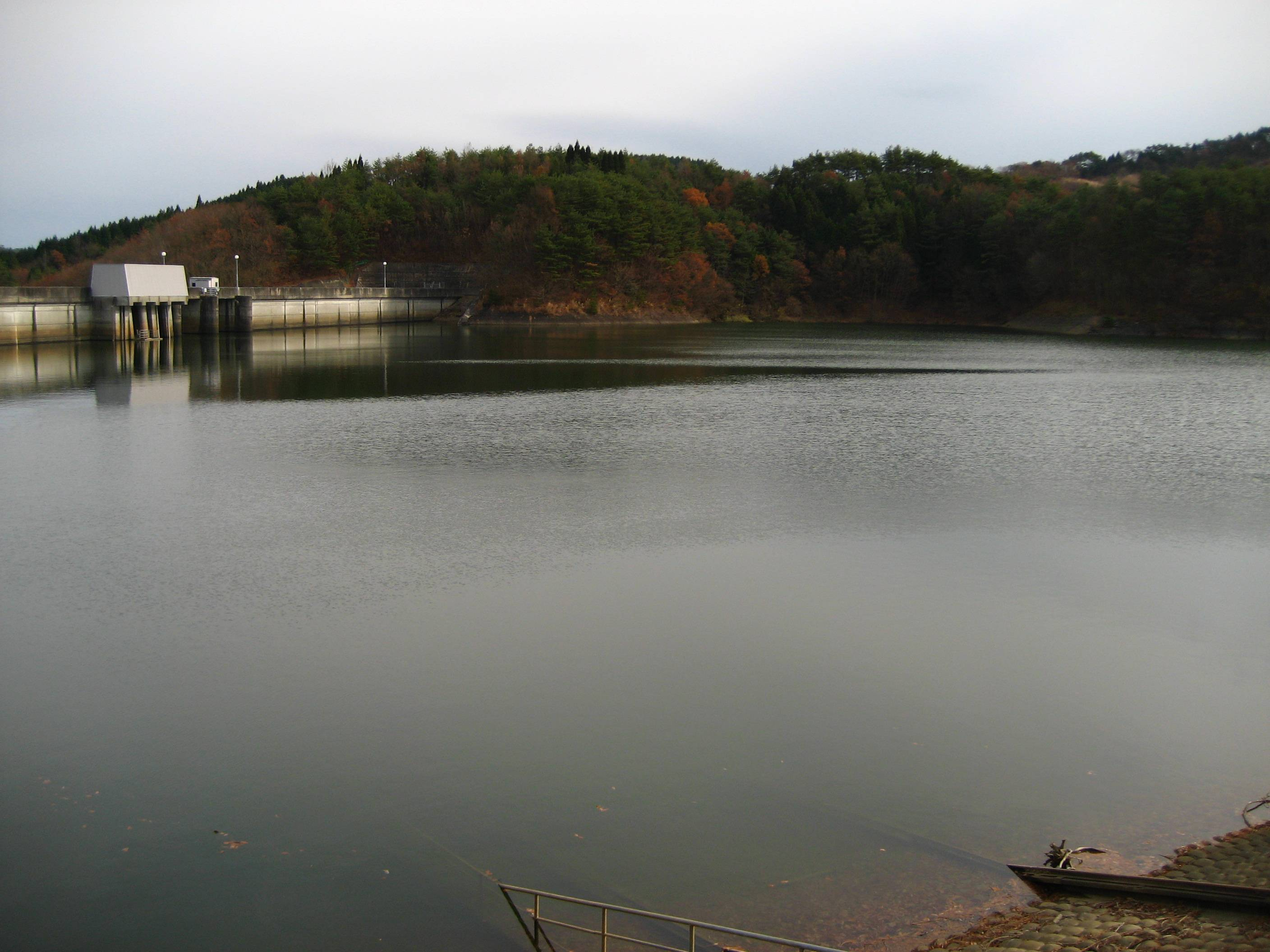

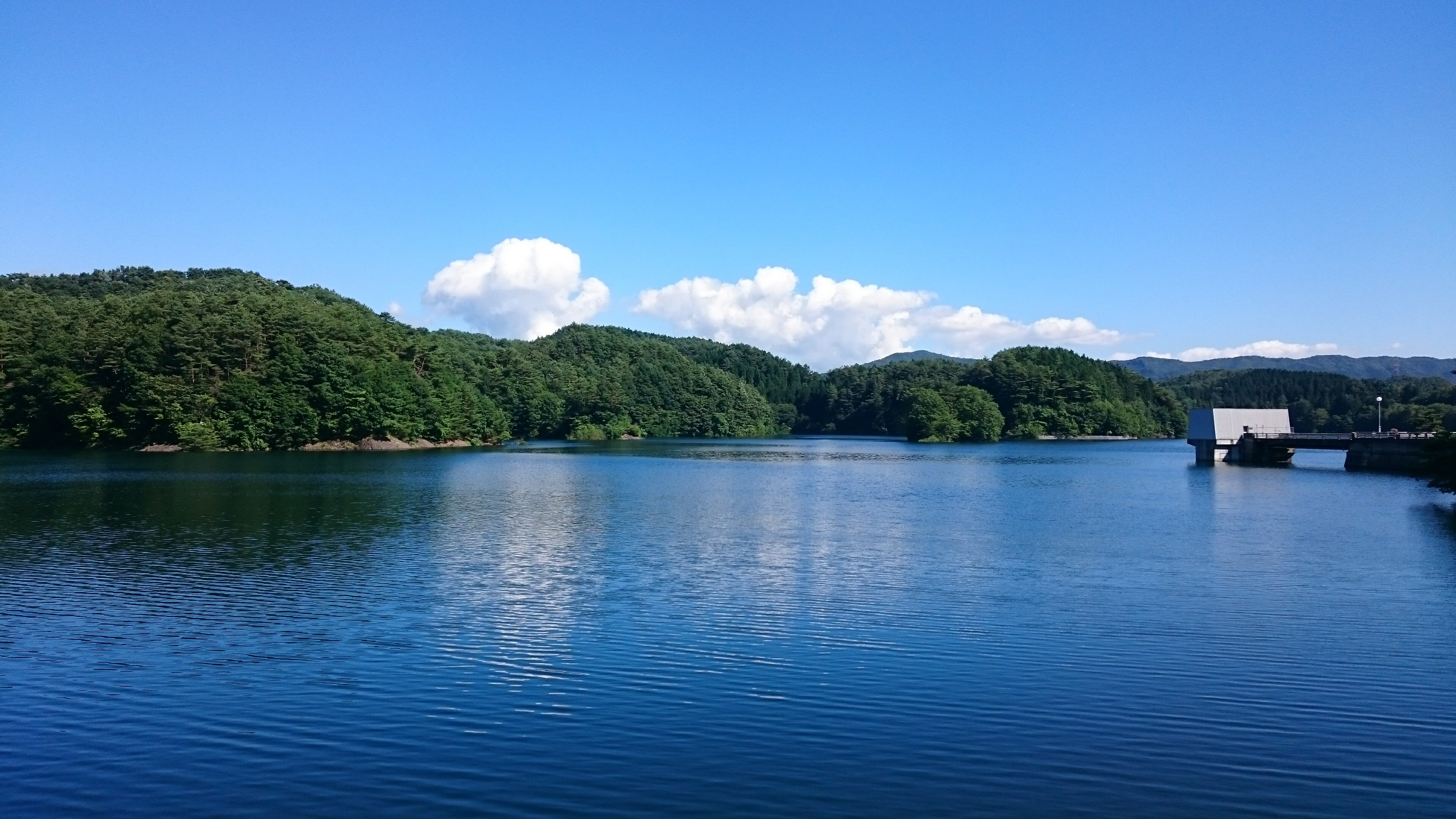
