= Yahagi Dam =

Dam in Aichi Prefecture, Japan

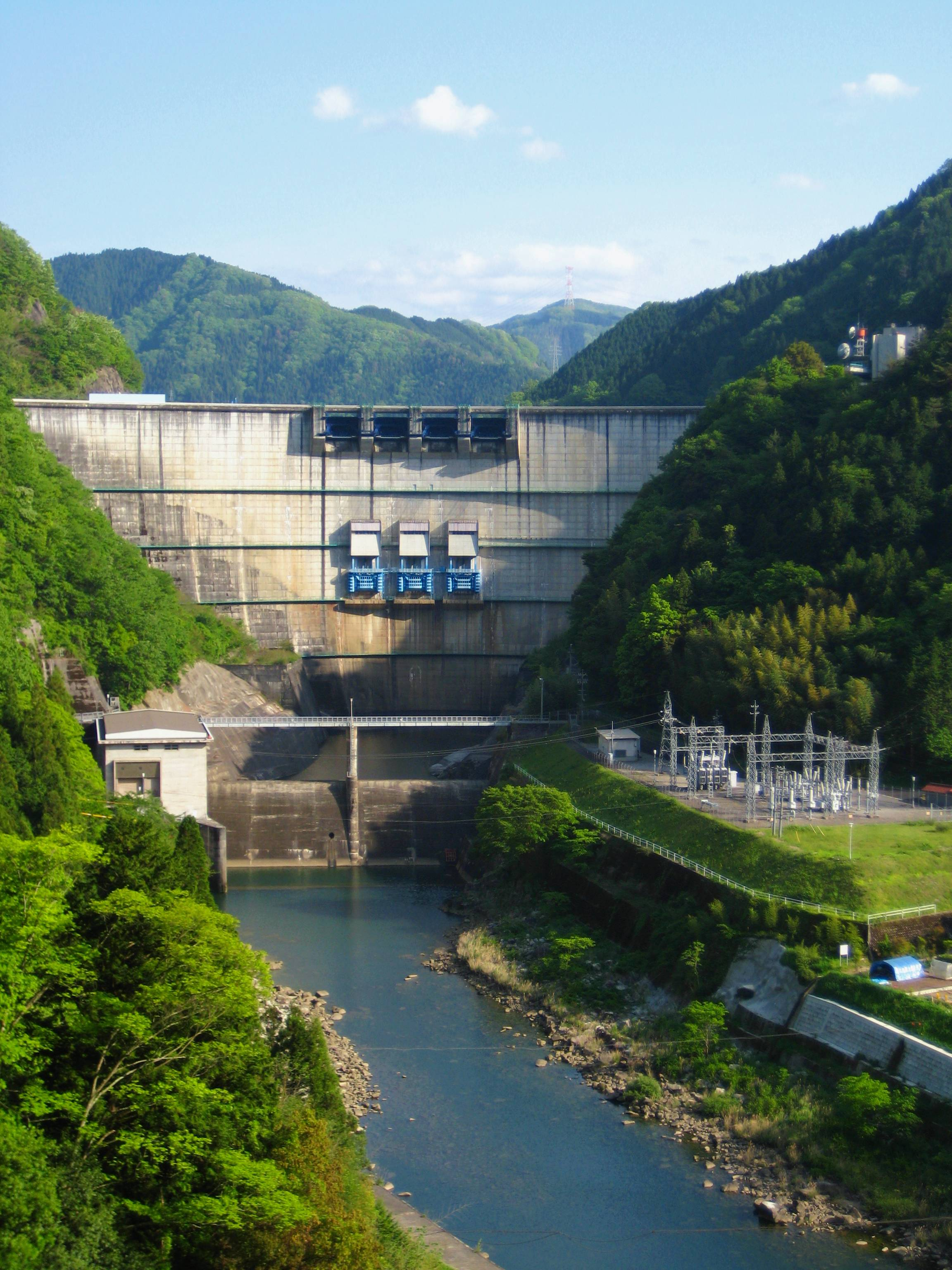
- Location: Toyota, Aichi Prefecture, Japan.
- Coordinates: 35°13′56.03″N 137°25′42.95″E
- Construction began: 1962
- Opening date: 1970

Dam and spillways
- Impounds: Yahagi River
- Height: 100 m
- Length: 323.1 m

Reservoir
- Total capacity: 80,000,000 m^{3}
- Catchment area: 504.5 km^{2}
- Surface area: 270 hectares

Yahagi Dam (Japanese: 矢作ダム, Hepburn: Yahagi Damu) is a dam near the city of Toyota in the Aichi Prefecture of Japan.

During the construction of the dam, the two villages of Asahi and Kushihara were flooded. 177 villagers were displaced.

== See also ==
- Yahagi No.2 Dam
