= Tominaga Dam =

Dam in Aichi Prefecture, Japan

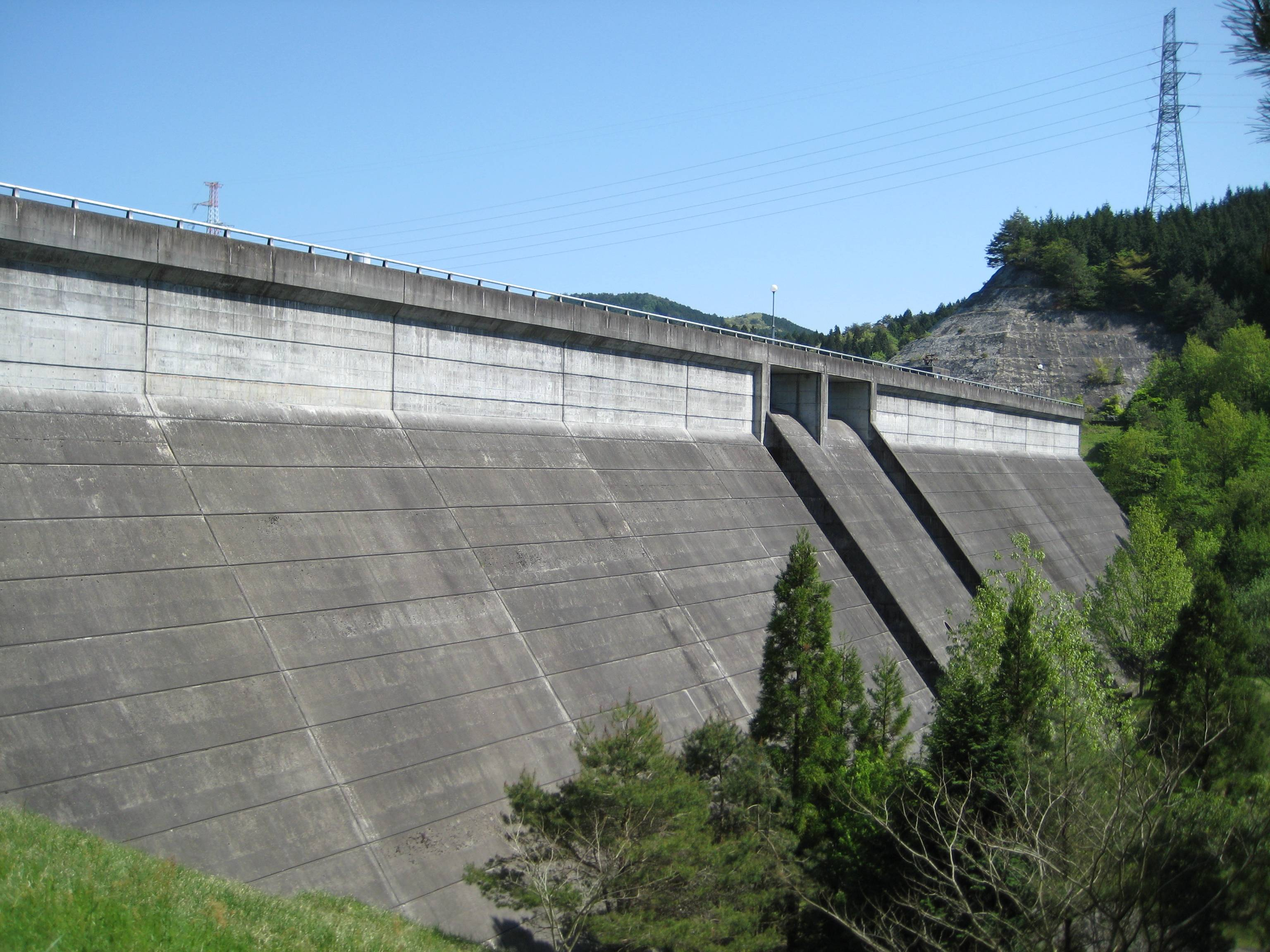
- Interactive map of Tominaga Dam
- Location: Toyone, Aichi Prefecture, Japan.
- Coordinates: 35°11′59″N 137°27′31″E
- Construction began: 1973
- Opening date: 1980

Dam and spillways
- Height: 32.5 m
- Length: 337 m

Reservoir
- Total capacity: 1,051,000 m^{3}
- Catchment area: 0.43 km^{2}
- Surface area: 11 hectares

Tominaga Dam (富永ダム) is a dam in the city of Toyota in the Aichi Prefecture of Japan. It is a concrete Gravity dam that stands at a height of approximately 107 feet (33 meters) and generates power for Chubu Electric Power.

== History ==
After the Second World War, Chubu Electric Power, which had been expanding its power supply facilities, made plans to construct their fourth large-scale pumped-storage hydroelectric plant in the Yahagi River system following the Hatanagi, Takane, and Mazegawa dams.
