= Wind power in Japan =

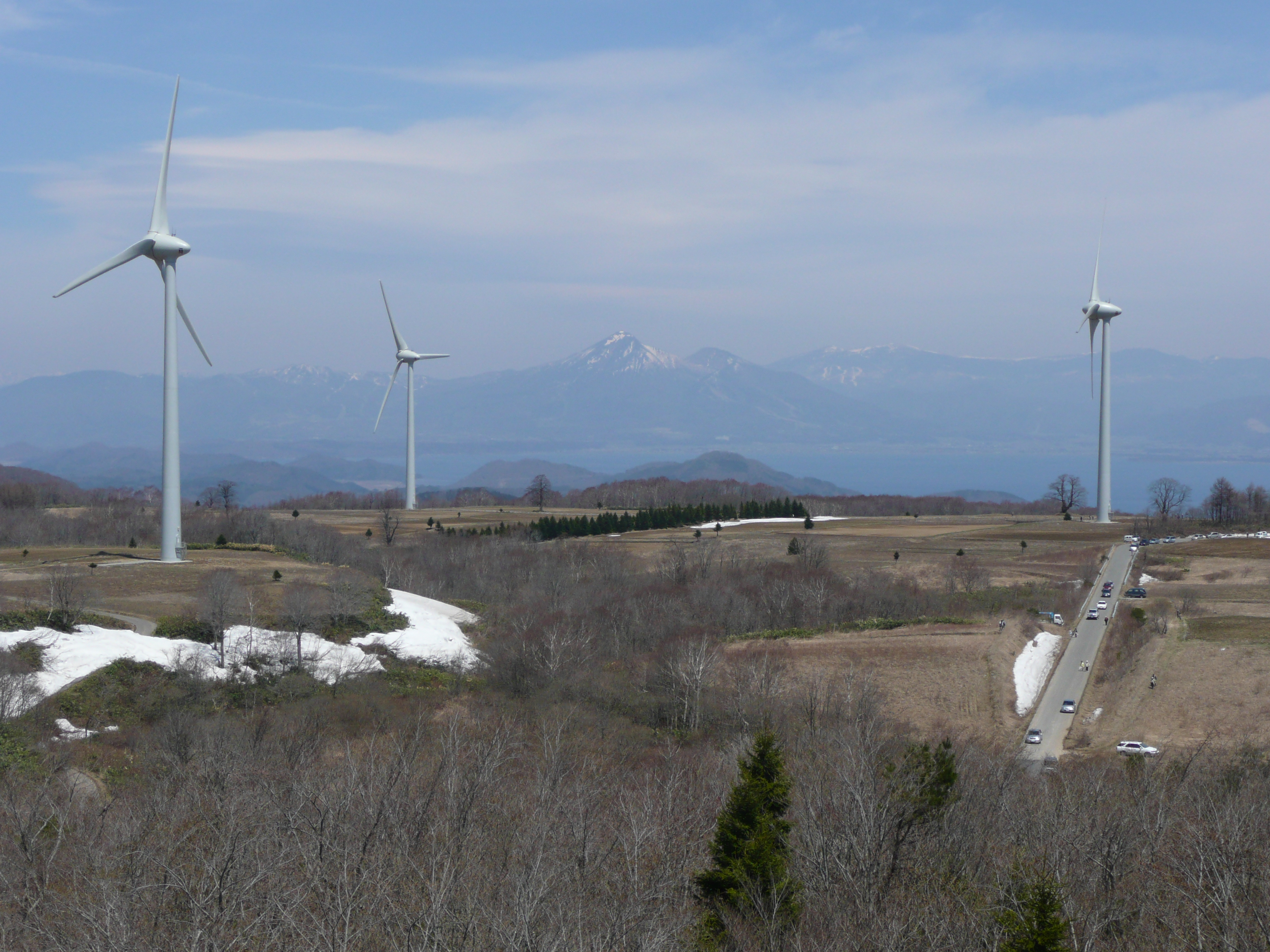
Turbines at the Nunobiki Plateau Wind Farm, one of the largest wind farms in Japan, with 33 turbines

In Japan's electricity sector, wind power generates a small proportion of the country's electricity. It has been estimated that Japan has the potential for 144 gigawatts (GW) for onshore wind and 608 GW of offshore wind capacity. As of 2023, the country had a total installed capacity of 5.2 GW.

As of 2018, government targets for wind power deployment were relatively low when compared to other countries, at 1.7% of electricity production by 2030.

In December 2020, the Japanese government announced plans to install up to 45 GW of offshore wind power by 2040.

== Statistics ==
Total capacity – Cumulative installed wind power capacity in megawatts since 2000

Year	Capacity	Change	% change
2000	136		
2001	302	166	122.06%
2002	338	36	11.92%
2003	580	242	71.60%
2004	809	229	39.48%
2005	1,049	240	29.67%
2006	1,309	260	24.79%
2007	1,538	229	17.49%
2008	1,882	344	22.37%
2009	2,186	304	16.15%
2010	2,475	289	13.22%
2011	2,556	81	3.27%
2012	2,562	6	0.23%
2013	2,646	84	3.28%
2014	2,753	107	4.04%
2015	2,809	56	2.03%
2016	3,205	396	14.1%
2017	3,483	278	8.67%
2018	3,498	15	0.43%
2019	3,952	454	12.98%
2020	4,262	310	7.84%
2021	4,262	0	0%
2022	4,372	110	2.58%
2023	5,232	860	19.67%

== Government regulation and incentives ==
As of 2017, the feed-in tariffs per kWh were 21 yen for onshore and 36 yen for offshore.

In April 2019 the Renewable Sea Area Utilization Law came into force. The Act is expected to promote offshore wind power projects by providing for long-term use of certain sea areas for offshore wind power projects based on a bidding process.

In 2020, a new feed-in premium scheme was passed. It comes into force in April 2022 and provides for premiums to be paid to electricity providers in addition to market prices achieved on the power market.

McKinsey estimates that for every 1 GW of added offshore capacity, Japan saves more than $300 million in fuel imports.

== Notable projects ==
The Shin Izumo Wind Farm owned by Eurus Energy was the largest wind farm in Japan as of 2011, comprising 26 turbines with a total nameplate capacity of 78 megawatts.

The Shin Aoyama Wind Farm owned by C-tech is the largest wind farm in Japan, as of February 2018. It comprises 40 turbines with a total nameplate capacity of 80 megawatts. The amount of electrical power that can be generated is equivalent to the annual consumption of about 44,000 ordinary households.

The Yurihonjo Offshore Wind Farm located in Akita Prefecture was expected to begin construction in 2021. It will comprise 70-90 turbines with a proposed capacity of as much as 1000 megawatts. Upon completion, its capacity is projected to be the largest offshore wind farm in Japan.

In 2011, Japan stated plans to build a pilot floating wind farm, with six 2-megawatt turbines, off the Fukushima coast. After the evaluation phase is complete in 2016, "Japan plans to build as many as 80 floating wind turbines off Fukushima by 2020."

In 2013, a floating offshore wind turbine was tested about 1 km off the coast of the island of Kabajima in Nagasaki Prefecture. It was a part of a Japanese government test project. This was the first of its kind in Japan.

The first full-scale offshore wind farm began operation in December 2022 with 20 turbines producing 140 MW.

In the second half of 2023, commissioning of the 340 MW Dohoku wind farm cluster on the island of Hokkaido using 79 typhoon-proof 4.3 MW onshore turbines was expected.

== See also ==
- Energy in Japan
- Geothermal power in Japan
- Hydroelectricity in Japan
- Solar power in Japan
- List of offshore wind farms in Japan
- Renewable energy by country
