= Nishi Sonogi Hantō Prefectural Natural Park =

Prefectural Natural park in Japan

- 西彼杵半島県立自然公園
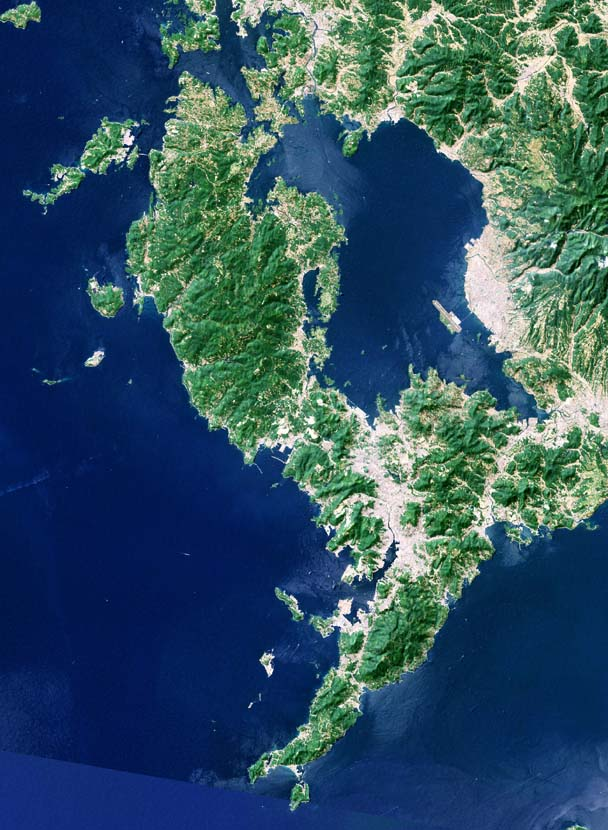
- The Nishisonogi Peninsula is the upper half
- Interactive map of Nishi Sonogi Hantō Prefectural Natural Park
- Location: Nagasaki Prefecture, Japan
- Area: 30.66 km^{2} (11.84 sq mi)
- Established: 11 January 1966

Nishi Sonogi Hantō Prefectural Natural Park (西彼杵半島県立自然公園, Nishi Sonogi Hantō kenritsu shizen kōen) is a Prefectural Natural Park in Nagasaki Prefecture, Japan. The park was established in 1966.

== See also ==
- National Parks of Japan
- Nomo Hantō Prefectural Natural Park
