= Energy in Japan =

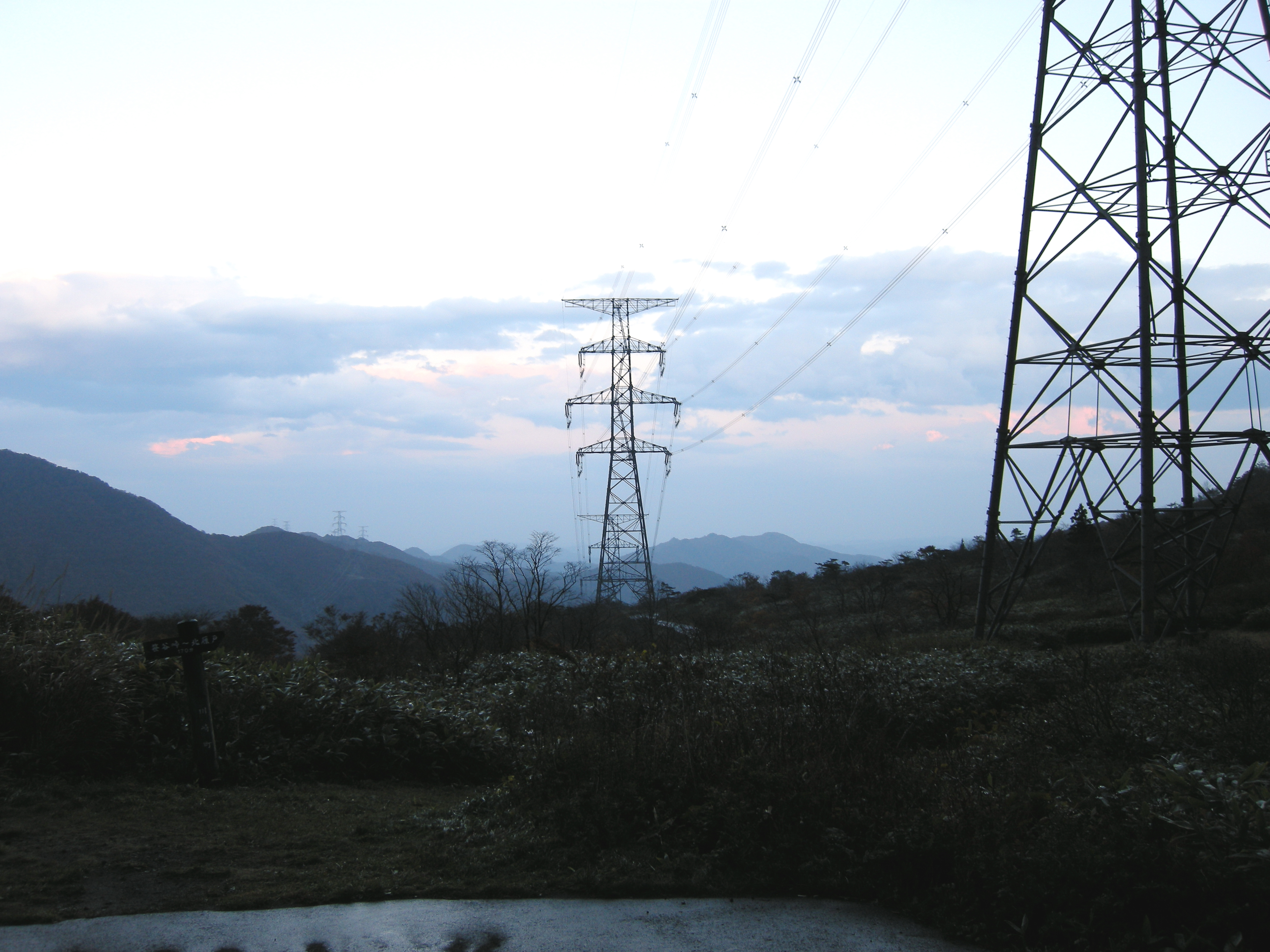
Electricity pylons in Japan

Japan is a major consumer of energy, ranking fifth in the world by primary energy use. Fossil fuels accounted for 67% of Japan's primary energy in 2023. Japan imports most of its energy due to scarce domestic resources. As of 2022, the country imports 97% of its oil and is the largest liquefied natural gas (LNG) importer globally.

Japan is increasing its reliance on renewable energy to replace imported fossil fuels, and in 2019 renewable energy accounted for 7.8% of primary energy supply. Japan has committed to reaching net zero emissions by 2050, setting a target to reduce GHG emissions by 60% from year 2013 levels by 2035 and by 73% by 2040. In addition, the 7th Strategic energy Plan has also set the renewable share goal to be 40-50% by the year 2040. As of 2024, the share of renewable energy in total electricity generation reached 26.7%, an increase from 25.7% in 2023.

Japan initiated its first commercial nuclear power reactor in 1966, establishing nuclear energy as a strategic national priority from 1973 onwards. Following the Fukushima nuclear accident in 2011, this strategy underwent re-evaluation and new plans were introduced to proactively utilize nuclear power. They had added new plans in the 7th Strategic Energy Plan: planning to build and use a safer and more efficient nuclear power, with consideration for the consent of the local community, changing the rule for the 60 year limit to exclude the period during the shutdown, and to implement plutonium to at least 12 nuclear power plants by Fiscal year 2030.

Prior to the accident, nuclear reactors contributed about 30% of Japan's electricity, with the country now aiming for nuclear energy to account for at least 20% of its electricity production by 2030. The Fukushima accident also led to a 16% reduction in total primary energy supply (TPES) from 2010 to 2019. However, because of current needs of Digital Transformation (DX) and Green Transformation (GX) from the massive need of electricity from AI, data centers, and semiconductor manufacturing, the demand for electricity is expected to increase. Moreover, the government has also made a goal to raise Japan's energy self-sufficiency rate to about 30 to 40% by Fiscal year 2040.Therefore, it is more likely that the usage of nuclear power will increase.

== Overview ==
GDP versus energy consumption, 1968–2012

Development of carbon dioxide emissions

Energy in Japan
Year	Population (million)	Prim. energy (TWh)	Production (TWh)	Import (TWh)	Electricity (TWh)	CO_{2}-emission (Mt)
2004	127.7	6,201	1,125	5,126	1,031	1,215
2007	127.8	5,972	1,052	5,055	1,083	1,236
2008	127.7	5,767	1,031	4,872	1,031	1,151
2009	127.3	5,489	1,091	4,471	997	1,093
2010	127.4	5,778	1,126	4,759	1,070	1,143
2012	127.8	5,367	601	4,897	1,003	1,186
2012R	127.6	5,260	329	5,062	989	1,223
2013	127.3	5,288	325	5,082	998	1,235
2020	125.8	4,642	1004.8	–	969	1,024
Change 2004–10	−0.2%	−6.8%	0.0%	−7.2%	3.7%	−5.9%
Mtoe = 11.63 TWh, Prim. energy includes energy losses that are 2/3 for nuclear power 2012R = CO_{2} calculation criteria changed, numbers updated

== History ==
In the post-war period, Japan's energy policy underwent significant transformation as it grappled with limited domestic energy resources. Initially, Japan relied heavily on coal, which accounted for over 80% of its energy needs in the 1950s, fueling its rapid industrialization and supporting its economic recovery. Coal was integral to powering factories, railways, and other critical infrastructure. However, by the late 1950s and early 1960s, Japan shifted towards oil due to its cost-effectiveness, higher energy density, and the challenges posed by domestic coal supply disruptions. By the 1970s, oil dominated Japan's energy mix, accounting for over 70% of its energy requirements, driven by rapid urbanization and the expansion of the transportation and manufacturing sectors. The 1973 oil crisis marked a turning point, exposing Japan's vulnerability to external supply shocks and triggering efforts to diversify its energy sources. This period saw the emergence of liquefied natural gas (LNG) as a viable alternative, valued for its lower environmental impact, flexibility, and increasing global availability. Japan signed its first LNG import agreement in 1967, and by the 1990s, partnerships with countries in the Middle East, particularly Qatar, solidified LNG as a cornerstone of its energy policy. These energy shifts—from coal to oil to LNG—reflect Japan's strategic adaptation to global energy dynamics, ensuring a stable supply while fostering deeper economic and political ties with resource-rich regions like the Gulf.

Japan's rapid industrial growth since the end of World War II doubled the nation's energy consumption every five years into the 1990s. During the 1960–72 period of accelerated growth, energy consumption grew much faster than GNP, doubling Japan's consumption of world energy. By 1976, with only 3% of the world's population, Japan was consuming 6% of global energy supplies.

Compared with other nations, electricity in Japan is relatively expensive, and, since the loss of nuclear power after the earthquake and tsunami disaster at Fukushima, the cost of electricity has risen significantly.

After the 2011 Fukushima nuclear accident the government made major revisions, which were first outlined in the 2014 Strategic Energy Plan. These revisions focused on restructuring the FIT (feed-in tariff) system, prioritizing disseminating renewable resources over fossil fuels, and using Fukushima as a hub for non-fossil fuel energy industries.

The COVID-19 pandemic had a significant impact on energy consumption. Although 2020-2021 energy emissions were stable, consumption rebounded in 2022.

== Energy sources ==
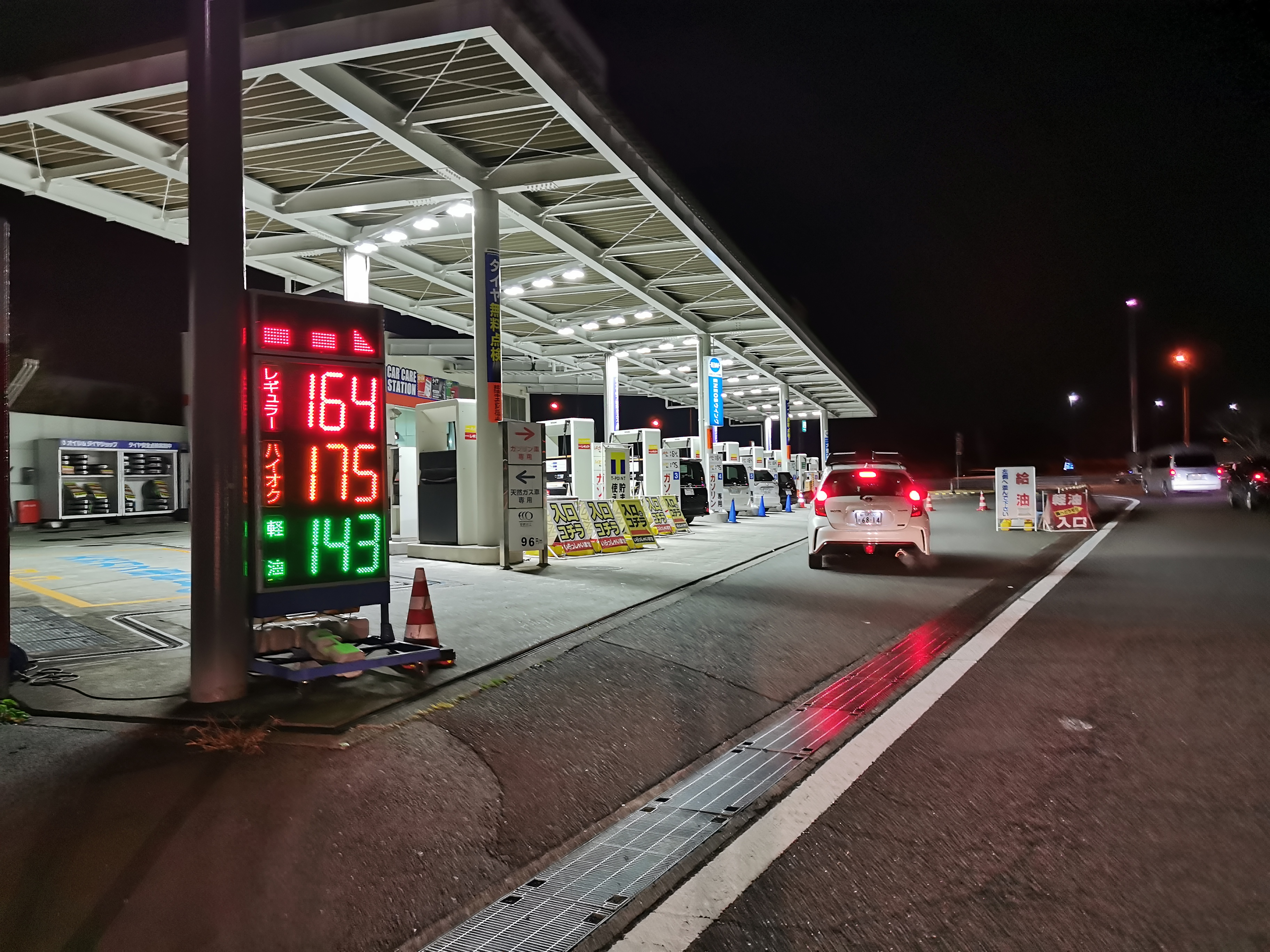
A self-service Eneos gas station in Ebina, Kanagawa

In 1950, coal supplied half of Japan's energy needs, hydroelectricity one-third, and oil the rest. By 2001, the contribution of oil had increased to 50.2% of the total, with rises also in the use of nuclear power and natural gas. Japan now depends heavily on imported fossil fuels to meet its energy demand.

As of 2024, electricity generated from fossil fuels fell to 65.1% lower compared to 66.6% the previous year. Yet, both natural gas and coal remained largely unchanged: LNG at 29.1% and coal at 28.2%.

Japan—primary energy use
Fuel	1950	1988	2001	2017
Oil	17%	57.3%	50.2%	40.6%
Natural gas	–	10.1%	13.6%	24.6%
Coal	50%	18.1%	16.8%	24.3%
Nuclear	–	9.0%	14.4%	10.4%
Hydro	33%	4.6%	4.0%	10.4%
Other	–	1.3%	1.0%	10.4%

=== Oil ===
In the wake of the two oil crises of the 1970s (1973 and 1979), Japan made efforts to diversify energy resources in order to increase energy security. Japan's domestic oil consumption dropped slightly, from around 5.1 million barrels (810,000 m^{3}) of oil per day in the late 1980s to 4.9 million barrels (780,000 m^{3}) per day in 1990. While the country's use of oil declined, its use of nuclear power and natural gas rose substantially. Several Japanese industries, for example electric power companies and steelmakers, switched from petroleum to coal, most of which is imported. Japan's proved oil reserves total an estimated 44 million barrels.

The state stockpile equals about 92 days of consumption and the privately held stockpiles equal another 77 days of consumption for a total of 169 days or 579 million barrels (92,100,000 m^{3}). The Japanese SPR is run by the Japan Oil, Gas and Metals National Corporation. Japan was the fifth-largest oil consumer and fourth-largest crude oil importer in the world in 2019.

Oil demand has been waning in Japan, especially leading up to and since the Tohoku earthquake in 2011. While oil consumption was over 5 million barrels per day (bpd) for decades, this had declined to 3.22 million bpd by 2017. As of 2016, India, Saudi Arabia and Texas have overtaken Japan in oil consumption. A further decline to 3.03 mln bpd or just under 176 million kiloliters (preliminary) was posted in 2018. Crude consumption further declined during first half of 2020 to 303/141 = 2.15 million bpd, but that figure probably doesn't include refined products that are directly increasingly imported rather than converted.

In 2022, Japan's crude oil imports rose to 2.5 million barrels per day (b/d), an increase from 2.3 million b/d in 2021, despite a decade-long trend of declining imports, which are now almost 0.9 million b/d less than the 2013 levels. The Middle East remained the predominant source, accounting for 93% of imports. Concurrently, Japan's crude oil acquisitions from Russia declined to 1% of the total, a decrease from 4% in the preceding year, in the aftermath of Russia's invasion of Ukraine.

=== Natural gas ===
Japan ranked as the world's largest importer of liquefied natural gas (LNG).

Because domestic natural gas production is minimal, rising demand is met by greater imports. In 2024, Japan imported approximately 66 million tons of natural gas. Australia was the largest supplier, accounting for 38.2% of imports, followed by Malaysia at 15.5%, the United States at 9.6%, Russia at 8.6%, and Papua New Guinea at 5.6%. Japan depended on imports for 97.9% of its natural gas supply. In 1987, suppliers were Indonesia (51.3%), Malaysia (20.4%), Brunei (17.8%), United Arab Emirates (7.3%), and the United States (3.2%). In 2017, Japan consumed 4.7 quadrillion Btu (1377 TWh) of imported methane.

Natural Gas Consumption in Japan from 2012 to 2022 (ft/Day)
2012	2013	2014	2015	2016	2017	2018	2019	2020	2021	2022
11.900	12.000	12.100	11.500	11.200	11.300	11.200	10.500	10.000	10.000	9.700

The new Japanese LNG strategy published in May 2016 envisages the creation of a liquid market and an international LNG hub in Japan. This promises to radically change the traditional JCC (crude oil) based pricing system in Japan, but also potentially in the Pacific Basin as a whole. But the path to hub creation and hub pricing in the early 2020s envisaged by the Strategy will not be straightforward.

In 2022, Japan's LNG imports decreased to 3.3 Tcf from 3.6 Tcf in 2021, yet it remained the world's leading LNG importer, surpassing China. Australia's contribution to Japan's imports increased from 36% to 42%, affirming its status as Japan's primary LNG supplier. Conversely, Qatar's share fell from 13% to 4%. Despite Japan's commitment to reducing energy dependence on Russia, in line with the G7's price cap on Russian crude oil, its LNG imports from Russia remained steady, supported by an exemption for the Sakhalin-2 project.

Japan has set a policy goal to reduce the share of LNG in its power generation from 34% in 2022 to 20% by 2030. As the largest single source of power in 2022, accounting for 34%, LNG consumption has seen a decline since 2019, influenced by the reactivation of nuclear plants, slow economic growth, high international LNG prices, and enhanced energy efficiency. Japan holds the largest LNG storage capacity in the world, estimated at 425.1 billion cubic feet, which plays a critical role in managing seasonal demand fluctuations and potential supply disruptions. Furthermore, from 2009 to 2023, the levels of LNG inventory in Japan varied between 32% and 66% of its storage capacity.

Japan's engagement with Middle Eastern nations, particularly Qatar, has played a crucial role in shaping its liquefied natural gas (LNG) imports and energy security. Following the adoption of LNG in the 1960s, Japan's shift towards cleaner and cost-effective energy sources has led to long-term partnerships with Gulf states. Qatar, home to the world's largest non-associated gas field, became a dominant LNG supplier to Japan in 1997, with agreements prioritizing reliability, cost optimization, and integrated supply systems. These ties have not only contributed to Japan's energy stability but also strengthened bilateral trade and technological cooperation, reflecting a broader interdependence between Japan and the Gulf region.

Under the 7th Strategic Energy Plan, Japan has raised its self-development target ratio for oil and natural gas to over 50% by 2030 and 60% by 2040, increasing equity participation in overseas projects. While Japan will continue to rely on LNG, they are also working to decarbonize the LNG value chain and reduce emissions.

=== Coal ===
As of 2019, a third of the electricity in Japan was generated from coal and is the third-largest importer of coal behind China and India in 2019. Government targets aimed to reduce that proportion to a quarter through closure of older, less efficient coal power plants. In 2017, Japan consumed 4.738 quadrillion Btu (1,388 TWh) of imported coal. In July 2020, the minister of Industry, Hiroshi Kajiyama, announced that around 100 coal plants would be shut down by 2030. In 2023 Japan said it would not start building any more new unabated (without carbon capture and storage) coal plants. Japan plans to phase out unabated coal by 2035.

Coal Consumption in Japan from 2014 to 2022 (Mst)
2014	2015	2016	2017	2018	2019	2020	2021	2022
215,079	212,558	212,493	214,393	208,504	206,517	203,062	201,875	206,881

In 2022, Japan's coal imports remained at 202 million short tons. Russian imports significantly decreased from 22 million to 13 million short tons, offset by increases from Indonesia, Canada, and Australia. Bituminous coal made up 89% of steam coal imports, slightly down from the previous year. The main sources—Australia, Indonesia, Russia, and the United States—contributed 94% of the total, a 3% decrease from 2021.

The contribution of coal-fired power generation decreased from 30.2% in 2016 to 26.5% in 2021, but then saw an increase to 27.8% in 2022.

Japan has set a policy goal to reduce the share of coal in electricity generation from 31% in 2022 to 19% by 2030. As part of this initiative, there are plans to close or suspend about 90% of inefficient coal-fired power plants, which amounts to approximately 100 facilities, thereby reducing Japan's total installed coal capacity by about 40%. Additionally, to further mitigate environmental impact, new coal-fired power plants are required to incorporate emission reduction measures, such as blending coal with 20% ammonia or 25% wood pellets to significantly lower carbon dioxide emissions.

=== Nuclear power ===
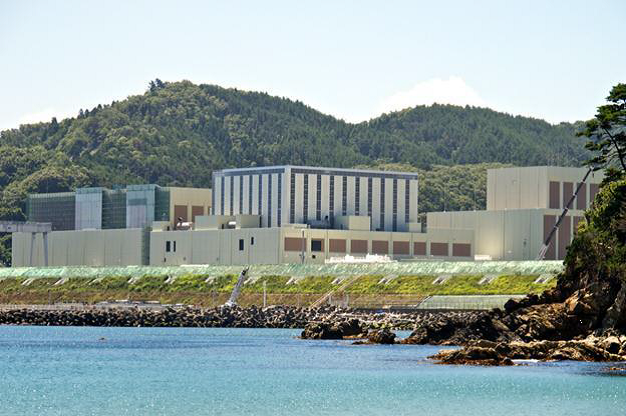
The Onagawa Nuclear Power Plant, a 3-unit BWR site typical of Japan's nuclear plants.

Following Eisenhower's Atoms for Peace speech, the United States helped Japan develop their nuclear power program. When Japan decided to embark on the nuclear power field, it imported technology from the United States and obtained uranium from Canada, France, South Africa, and Australia. The first nuclear reactor was commissioned in 1966, from then to 2010, 54 more nuclear reactors had opened, with total generation capacity of 48,847 MW. The ratio of nuclear power generation to total electricity production increased from 2% in 1973 to around 30% in March 2011. During the 1980s, Japan's nuclear power program was strongly opposed by environmental groups, particularly after the Three Mile Island accident in the United States. In the 2000s, Japan had a few of the modern Advanced Boiling Water Reactor, including some of the first new advanced Generation III reactors. At Rokkasho, Aomori a facility was built to enrich nuclear fuel, deal with nuclear waste, and recycle spent nuclear fuel.

The 2011 Tōhoku earthquake and tsunami damaged some nuclear reactors, and was the immediate cause of the Fukushima nuclear accident. This caused much uncertainty and fear about the release of radioactive material, as well as highlighting the ongoing concerns over seismic design standards (see Nuclear power in Japan §Seismicity). On 5 May 2012, Japan shut down the last nuclear reactor, the first time there has been no nuclear power production since 1970. On 16 June, Prime Minister Yoshihiko Noda ordered the restart of Ōi nuclear plant's reactors number 3 and 4, saying that people's livelihood needs to be protected. Ōi nuclear plant's reactor No. 3 was restarted on 2 July, and No. 4 began operation on 21 July. However, in September 2013 the plant was shut down again in order to have extensive safety inspections performed.

By late 2015, both of the Sendai Nuclear Power Plant's reactors had reopened and restarted producing nuclear energy. Other nuclear plants, such as the Takahama Nuclear Power Plant, have received permission to reopen, and other nuclear reactors are beginning the process of restarting.

In a draft of Japan's seventh long-term energy plan (December 2024), the Japanese government expresses the aim that nuclear power should account for 20% of Japan's energy supply by 2040, rising from 8.5% in 2023. This goal was raised to increase Japan's energy self-sufficiency rate to approximately 30 to 40% by 2040.

Japan's 7th Strategic Energy Plan further emphasizes the proactive use of nuclear power, driven by the growing energy demand for more energy with Digital Transformation (DX) and Green Transformation (GX).

Japan has restructured the usage of nuclear power in several ways. One is to rebuild a new advanced reactor that incorporates enhanced safety mechanisms and will only be approved with the consent of local communities. In addition, under the GX Decarbonization Power Source Act, a new system is proposed that excludes periods of shutdown from the 60-year maximum operating limit. Moreover, Japan will continue to promote its nuclear fuel recycling system. The plan is to reprocess used nuclear fuel to extract plutonium, which can then be reused as MOX fuel in nuclear reactors. This process is known as pluthermal. Japan aims to have at least 12 reactors using MOX fuel by FY2030. The government is currently working towards the completion of the Rokkasho Reprocessing Plant and MOX Fuel Fabrication Plant.

As a result, compared to the 7.7% share of nuclear generation in 2023, it has risen to 8.2% in 2024.

The policy to increase the share of nuclear energy, which dates from 2015, reversed a decision by the previous Democratic Party.

As of 2025, operating reactors are:

Plant	Date	Unit restarted	Ref.
Sendai Nuclear Power Plant	11 August 2015	1	
Sendai Nuclear Power Plant	1 November 2015	2	
Takahama Nuclear Power Plant	22 May 2017	4	
Takahama Nuclear Power Plant	6 June 2017	3	
Ōi Nuclear Power Plant	14 March 2018	3	
Ōi Nuclear Power Plant	9 May 2018	4	
Genkai Nuclear Power Plant	23 March 2018	3	
Genkai Nuclear Power Plant	June 2018	4	
Mihama Nuclear Power Plant	23 June 2021	3	
Ikata Nuclear Power Plant	2 December 2021	3	

- As of 2025, the government worked towards restarting the nuclear power plants in both Onagawa and Shimane, both of which have been certified to meet the new regulatory standards.
- Nuclear Power Station in Kashiwazaki-Kariwa was also undergoing intensive efforts to restart to solve the demand for electricity supply and reduce price disparities in Eastern Japan.

=== Renewables ===
The Fourth Strategic Energy Plan set the renewable share goal to be 40 to 50% by fiscal year 2040.In the next 15 years, Japan intends on investing $700 billion into renewable energy. One initiative the Japanese government has implemented in order to boost the amount of renewable energy produced and purchased in Japan is the feed-in tariff scheme. Japan had transitioned from the previous Renewable Portfolio Standards (RPS) to shifting investment to a Feed-in-Tariff (FIT) in July 2012.The scheme encourages companies to invest in renewable energy by providing set prices for various types of renewable energy. The initiatives appear to be working, as renewable energy generation capacity now stands at 26.2 GW, compared to 20.9 GW in 2012.

On 3 July 2018, Japan's government pledged to increase renewable energy sources, including wind and solar, from 15% to 22–24% by 2030. Nuclear power will provide 20% of the country's energy needs as an emissions-free energy source. This will help Japan meet climate change commitments.

In October 2021 Japan's cabinet approved a new target of 36–38% of renewable share in power generation by 2030. The nuclear target of 20–22% remained unchanged.

In 2022, renewables are estimated to make up 22.7% of Japan's overall electricity generation, including consumption at the site of generation, which is a slight rise from 22.4% in the previous year.

As of 2024, the share of renewable energy in total electricity generation reached 26.7%, an increased from 25.7% in 2023.

==== Hydroelectricity ====
The country's main renewable energy source is hydroelectricity, with an installed capacity of about 27 GW and a production of 69.2 TWh of electricity in 2009. There are still 14,440 MW of potential small and medium-scale hydropower that can be implemented in Japan, according to the Ministry of the Environment. In recent years, Japan has focused particularly on mini and micro hydropower facilities, especially in mountainous regions that have less environmental impact.

Hydropower capacity in Japan from 2014 to 2023 (MW)
2014	2015	2016	2017	2018	2019	2020	2021	2022	2023
49,597	50,035	50,058	50,015	50,037	50,033	50,033	50,009	50,015	50,033

==== Solar power ====
Japan was the world's second largest producer of solar power in the early 2000s, although solar was a very minor contribution to the total at that time. The country was overtaken by Germany in 2005, a year in which Japan had 38% of the world supply compared to Germany's 39%. Since then, Japan had been slow to increase solar capacity compared to other countries until 2012.

Solar energy capacity in Japan from 2014 to 2023 (MW)
2014	2015	2016	2017	2018	2019	2020	2021	2022	2023
23,339	34,150	42,040	49,500	56,162	63,192	71,868	78,413	83,057	87,068

On 1 July 2012, after the nuclear disaster at Fukushima, new tariffs for renewable energy were introduced by the Japanese government. The tariffs, set at ¥42 per kWh over the next 20 years to solar power producers, were among the highest in the world. With the incentives in place, Japan added 1,718 MW of solar power in 2012. By the end of the year, Japan's total solar capacity was 7.4 GW. Japan has seen sustained growth of solar PV capacity after 2012, reaching a cumulative installed capacity of 34 GW by the end of 2015, generating 3.5% of the national electricity consumption in that year.

In 2022, electricity produced by solar photovoltaic (PV) systems amounted to 9.9% of the total annual electricity output, reflecting a growth of 0.6 percentage points from 9.3% in 2021.

As of 2024, the usage of solar power has reached 11.4%, slowly approaching the 15% target goal for 2030.

==== Wind power ====
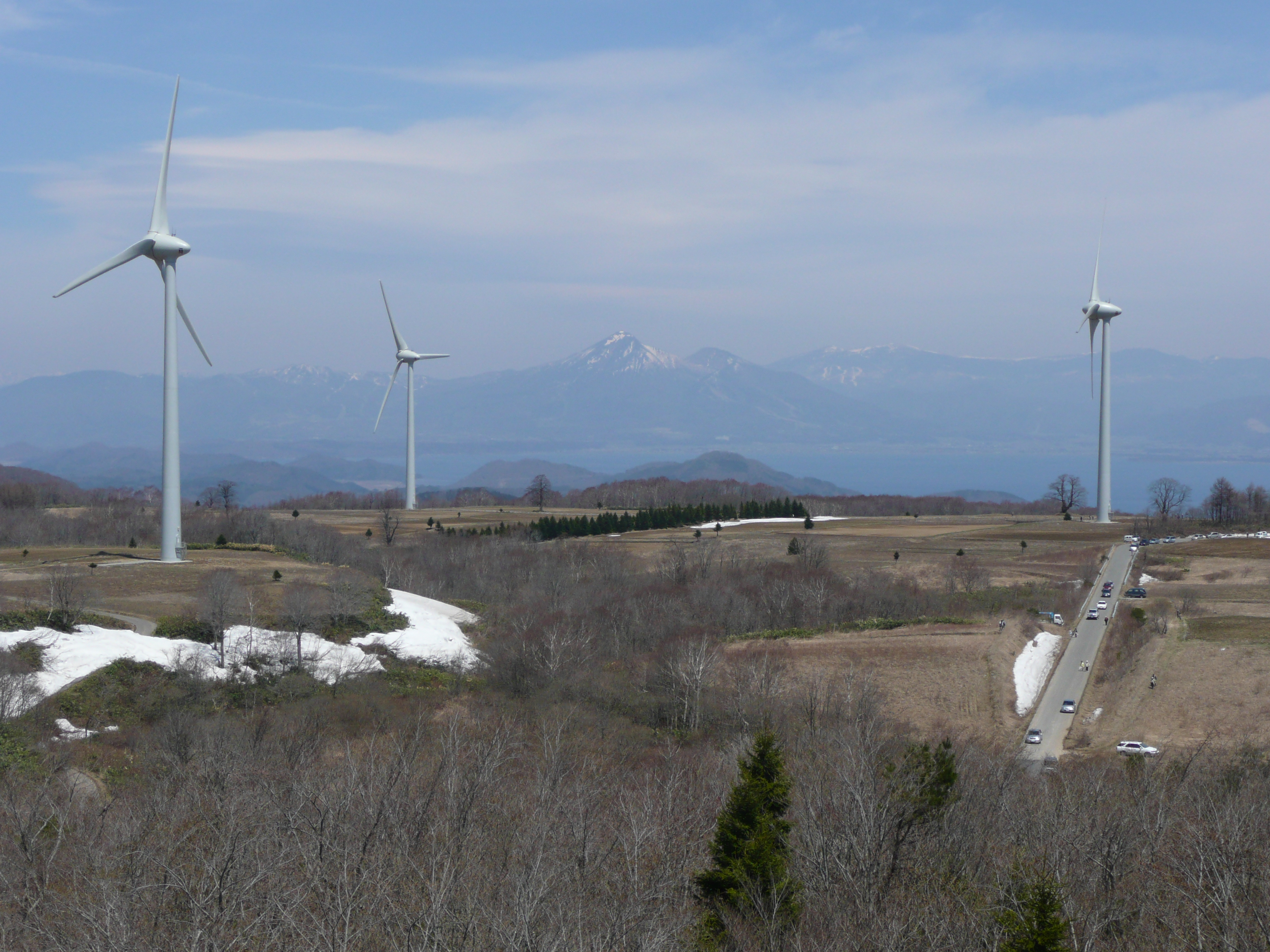
Turbines at the Nunobiki Plateau Wind Farm, one of the largest wind farms in Japan, with 33 turbines

In Japan's electricity sector, wind power generates a small proportion of the country's electricity. It has been estimated that Japan has the potential for 144 gigawatts (GW) for onshore wind and 608 GW of offshore wind capacity. As of 2023, the country had a total installed capacity of 5.2 GW.

As of 2018, government targets for wind power deployment were relatively low when compared to other countries, at 1.7% of electricity production by 2030.

In December 2020, the Japanese government announced plans to install up to 45 GW of offshore wind power by 2040.

Wind energy capacity in Japan from 2014 to 2023 (MW)
2014	2015	2016	2017	2018	2019	2020	2021	2022	2023
2,753	2,809	3,205	3,483	3,498	3,952	4,120	4,262	4,372	5,232

In 2022, wind power contributed to 0.85% of electricity production, experiencing a slight decrease from 0.88% in the previous year.

==== Geothermal energy ====
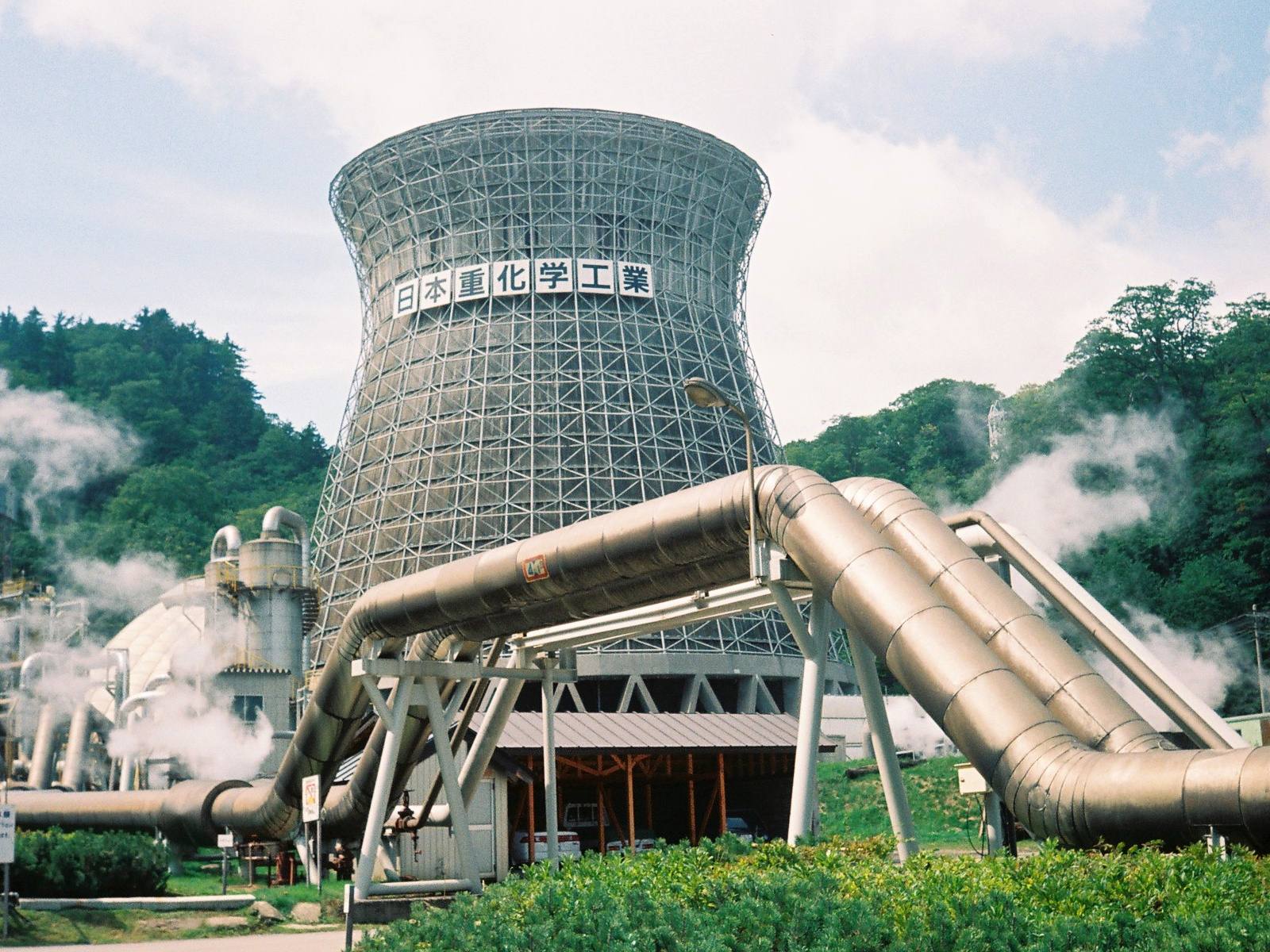
Matsukawa geothermal power station, the first commercial geothermal power station in Japan

Japan has favorable sites for geothermal power because of its proximity to the Izu–Bonin–Mariana Arc. Japan's geothermal energy sector leverages the nation's volcanic activity, which positions it among countries with high potential for Renewable energy development The Geography of Japan along the Pacific Ring of Fire, combined with its abundance of active volcanoes, creates ideal conditions for the development of geothermal power plants.

In 2007, Japan had 535.2 MW of installed electric generating capacity, about 5% of the world total. Geothermal power plays a minor role in the energy sector in the country: in 2013 it supplied 2596 GWh of electricity, representing about 0.25% of the country's total electricity supply.

Development of new geothermal power stations has slowed since the mid-1990s. Many potential sites are situated in government-protected areas and popular tourist destinations, including traditional hot springs or onsen. Hot springs are a notable aspect of Japan's onsen culture and are often considered in discussions about energy policy and geothermal development due to their cultural and economic roles. Local communities in these areas, which frequently depend on tourism revenue from onsen, have expressed reservations about the potential impact of geothermal projects on the landscape and the tourism industry. The Sumikawa Geothermal Power Station, located within Towada-Hachimantai National Park, is one of Japan's eighteen geothermal power sites and one of seven in the northern Honshu region (Tohoku). Operating since 1995, the Sumikawa Geothermal Power Station generates 50,000 kW of electrical energy and hot water, supporting the city of Kazuno and surrounding areas, home to approximately 32,000 residents.

Geothermal energy has been increasing in recent years due to the Japanese energy crisis following the Fukushima disaster and the subsequent closure of most of the country's nuclear power stations. Businesses and the government are currently considering over 60 possible sites for new geothermal power development. Estimated total capacity potential of geothermal power at 23 GW, the third largest amount in the world after the United States and Indonesia. Japan ranks third in the world in terms of geothermal potential, with more than 100 volcanoes contributing to its energy prospects. List of volcanoes in Japan.

Out of the 100 volcanoes with geothermal energy potential, most of Japan's 20 major geothermal power plants are in the Tohoku and Kyushu regions, which are home to some of the country's most abundant hot springs.

Geothermal energy capacity in Japan from 2014 to 2023 (MW)
2014	2015	2016	2017	2018	2019	2020	2021	2022	2023
508	516	526	471	473	481	487	487	437	428

Geothermal energy development in Japan faces significant challenges in balancing energy development with the preservation of the traditional hot spring (onsen) culture. While having the world's third-largest geothermal energy potential, many residents are concerned that hot springs may become scarce. These concerns are particularly common in tourist areas such as Beppu, where hot springs play an essential role in both local culture and the economy. In addition, about 80% of Japan's geothermal resources are located within national parks or places with similar protection, where strict environmental regulations, such as those under the Natural Parks Act and Hot Springs Act, complicate permissions related to hot springs.

The 2025 draft of the 7th Strategic Energy Plan introduced the Geothermal Frontier Project and the Accelerated Geothermal Development Package. These initiatives aim to expand scientific knowledge of geothermal resources while ensuring that local hot spring businesses are respected and supported through community consent.

==== Waste and biomass energy ====
As of September 2011, Japan had 190 generators attached to municipal waste units and 70 independent plants using biomass fuel to produce energy. In addition, 14 other generators were used to burn both coal and biomass fuel. In 2008, Japan produced 322 million tons of biomass fuel and converted 76% of it into energy.

Solid biofuels and renewable waste capacity in Japan from 2014 to 2023 (MW)
2014	2015	2016	2017	2018	2019	2020	2021	2022	2023
1,615	1,878	2,179	2,561	2,974	3,436	3,828	4,471	5,307	6,276

In 2022, the proportion of electricity generated from biomass power rose to 4.6%, an increase from 4.1% in the preceding year.

==== Ocean energy ====
In 2012, the government announced plans to build experimental tidal power and wave power plants in coastal areas. Construction on the projects, the locations for which had not been determined, would have begun in 2013.

There is a potential for generating tidal power in the Seto Inland Sea, which contributes to Japan's 2050 carbon neutrality goal. Using high-resolution ocean modeling, researchers have identified several locations suitable for tidal energy development, such as the Naruto Strait, the Akashi Strait, the Kurushima Strait, and the Obatake Strait. The study concluded that installing tidal turbines at the Obatake Strait in Yamaguchi Prefecture could supply electricity to approximately 100,000 households. Moreover, implementing the Obatake Stait project would help reduce carbon emissions by about 198,000 tons of CO2 per year.

=== Batteries ===
Japan's energy sector has experienced a significant expansion of renewable energy capacity, growing by over 30% in the past five years, fueling demand for battery energy storage systems (BESS). Over half of the 2.4 gigawatts of capacity awarded in recent long-term low-carbon power auctions went to foreign companies or consortia, with major projects including over 1.37 GW of new BESS capacity and more than 6.7 GWh of energy capacity approved for 2024. Japan's Long Term Decarbonization Power Source Auction incentivizes BESS development by guaranteeing fixed cost recovery for 20 years. However, limited price volatility and a price floor in the Japanese power market may constrain returns for BESS operators, highlighting the need for further reforms.

== Electricity sector ==
Electricity production in Japan by source

Map of Japan's electricity distribution network, showing incompatible systems between regions

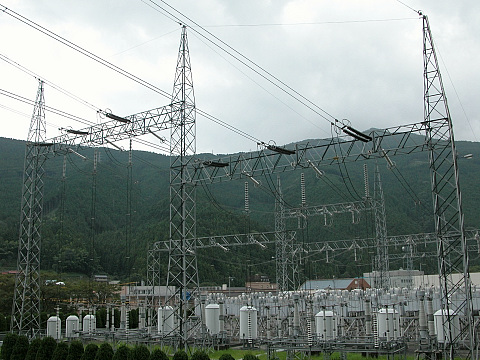
The Sakuma Frequency Converter Station

In 2014, Japan ranked fifth in the world by electricity production, after the United States, China, Russia, and India with 934 TWh produced during that year. It is estimated that Japan's net electricity generation was at about 950 terawatthours (TWh) in 2019 and has declined overall by about 11% since 2010. In 2019, Japan's net electricity generation decreased nearly 4% from the 2018 level as a result of warm winter weather and lower industrial output.

In terms of per capita electricity consumption, the average person in Japan consumed 8,459 kWh in 2004 compared to 14,240 kWh for the average American. In that respect it ranked 18th among the countries of the world. Its per capita electricity consumption increased by 21.8% between 1990 and 2004.

Japan had 282 GW of total installed electricity generating capacity in 2010, the third largest in the world behind the United States and China. However, after the damage by the 2011 earthquake, capacity is estimated to be around 243 GW in mid-2011. It was one of the world's largest users of solar energy, in fourth place behind Germany, Italy, and China. With 53 active nuclear power generating reactor units in 2009, that year Japan ranked third in the world in that respect, after the United States (104 reactors) and France (59). Almost one quarter (24.93%) of its electricity production was from nuclear plants, compared to 76.18% for France and 19.66% for the United States. However, after the 2011 Tōhoku earthquake and tsunami and the subsequent Fukushima Daiichi nuclear disaster, all plants eventually shut down in May 2012 and Ōi Nuclear Power Plant was restarted and operational between June 2012 and September 2013. On 11 August 2015 and 1 November 2015, the two nuclear reactors of Sendai Nuclear Power Plant were restarted respectively. Since the generation disruption caused by the Fukushima disaster, rapid steps have been made to liberalize the electricity market. One way this was done in Japan is through the feed-in-tariff scheme. This was announced in 2012 as a direct consequence of the Fukushima disaster. The feed-in-tariff scheme encourages utility operators and companies to purchase and invest in renewable energy. The Ministry of Economy, Trade and Industry set prices for various renewable energy sources to encourage the production and consumption of renewable energy. In April 2016 domestic and small business customers became able to select from over 250 supplier companies competitively selling electricity. Also wholesale electricity trading on the Japan Electric Power Exchange has been encouraged.

Japan produced 1004.8 TWh of electricity in 2021, close to 4% of the electricity generated in the world and 8% of that in Asia-Pacific (3rd largest behind China and India). Japan consumed 17.03 EJ, 3% of the world's consumption and 7% of Asia-Pacific's consumption (3rd largest behind China and India).

Nuclear energy's contribution to electricity generation has fluctuated, dropping to zero in 2014, then climbing to 6.5% by 2019. It fell to 4.3% in 2020, slightly rose to 5.9% in 2021, and then decreased once more to 4.8% in 2022.

As of 2024, renewable energy accounted for 26.7% of Japan's total electricity generation, up from previous year of 25.7%. Specifically, solar contributed 11.4%, hydropower 7.9%, biomass 5.9%, and wind 1.13%.The government plans to use public bidding under Japan's Offshore Renewable Energy Act to develop 10 GW of offshore renewable energy projects by 2030 and 30-45 GW by 2040.

Furthermore, Japan aims to steadily reduce the cost of renewable electricity. Specifically, they are aiming to drop the amount to 20 yen/ kWh by 2025, 14 yen/kWh by 2030, and 10-14 yen/kWh by 2040. The government also plans to increase domestic manufacturing of renewable energy equipment by 2030. Cooperation between the government and private companies is considered essential to enable mass production and global competitiveness. Ultimately, the government hopes to achieve 20 GW of installed renewable electricity capacity by 2040.

Because Japan is shifting more towards renewable energy, the demand for grid-scale battery storage is growing. Maintaining a balance between supply and demand is being prioritized. By March 2025, applications to connect large batteries to the grid had reached about 113 GW, demonstrating strong market interest. However, only 12 GW have been approved due to transmission limits and grid congestion. This is because Japan's electric system currently has more residential batteries than large utility systems. In order for Japan to integrate large-scale storage, uprgrading the grid and expanding utility-scale storage is necessary to improve overall system flexibility.

=== National grid ===
Unlike most other industrial countries, Japan doesn't have a single national grid but instead has separate eastern and western grids. The standard voltage at power outlets is 100 V, but the grids operate at different frequencies: 50 Hz in Eastern Japan and 60 Hz in Western Japan. The grids are connected together by three frequency converter stations (Higashi-Shimizu, Shin Shinano and Sakuma), but these can only handle 1 GW in total. A converter station also exists at Minami-Fukumitsu. The 2011 Tōhoku earthquake and tsunami resulted in 11 reactors being taken offline with a loss of 9.7GW. The three converter stations did not have the capacity to transfer enough power from Japan's western power grid to significantly help the eastern grid.

The two grids were originally developed by separate companies. Tokyo Electric Light Co was established in 1883, which also established electric power in Japan. In 1895, demand had grown enough that TELCO bought generation equipment from AEG of Germany. The same happened in the western parts of Japan with General Electric being the supplier to Osaka Electric Lamp. GE's equipment used the US standard of 60 Hz, while AEG's equipment used the European standard of 50 Hz.

=== Utilities ===
In Japan, the electricity market is divided into 10 regulated companies:

- Chugoku Electric Power Company (CEPCO/ENERGIA)
- Chubu Electric Power (Chuden)
- Hokuriku Electric Power Company (Hokuden)
- Hokkaido Electric Power Company (HEPCO)
- Kyushu Electric Power (Kyuden)
- Kansai Electric Power Company (KEPCO)
- Okinawa Electric Power Company (Okiden)
- Tokyo Electric Power Company (TEPCO)
- Tohoku Electric Power (Tohokuden)
- Shikoku Electric Power Company (Yonden)

== Hydrogen energy ==
In March 2016, METI set a target of 40,000 hydrogen fuel-cell vehicles on Japan's roads by 2020 and 160 fueling stations.

== Carbon emissions ==
Japan has a goal of net zero greenhouse gas emissions by 2050. Achieving this target will require changes in daily life to focus on lowering energy demand. This starts with saving electricity in buildings and factories. Moreover, Japan needs to invest in low-carbon technologies such as nuclear power and carbon capture.

== International cooperation and energy diplomacy ==
Geopolitical tensions, such as the Russian invasion of Ukraine, have strengthened Japan's resource diplomacy. This includes financial support from Japan Oil, Gas and Metals National Corporation (JOGMEC) and developing systems to secure emergency gas supplies with the help of the International Energy Agency (IEA).

Moreover, in recent years, Japan has focused on Green Economic Diplomacy, where it provides advanced green technology to emerging countries in exchange for stronger partnerships, particularly in LNG and oil imports. By doing so, Japan aims to stabilize its energy system despite its scarce domestic energy resources.

== See also ==
- Electricity sector in Japan
- Energy Law (Japan)
- Geothermal power in Japan
- Hydroelectricity in Japan
- Japan Electric Association
- Japan Oil, Gas and Metals National Corporation
- List of countries by energy consumption per capita
- List of countries by total primary energy consumption and production
- Renewable energy by country
- Solar power in Japan
- Wind power in Japan
- World energy consumption
