= Sumikawa Geothermal Power Plant =

Geothermal power plant in Kazuno, Akita, Japan

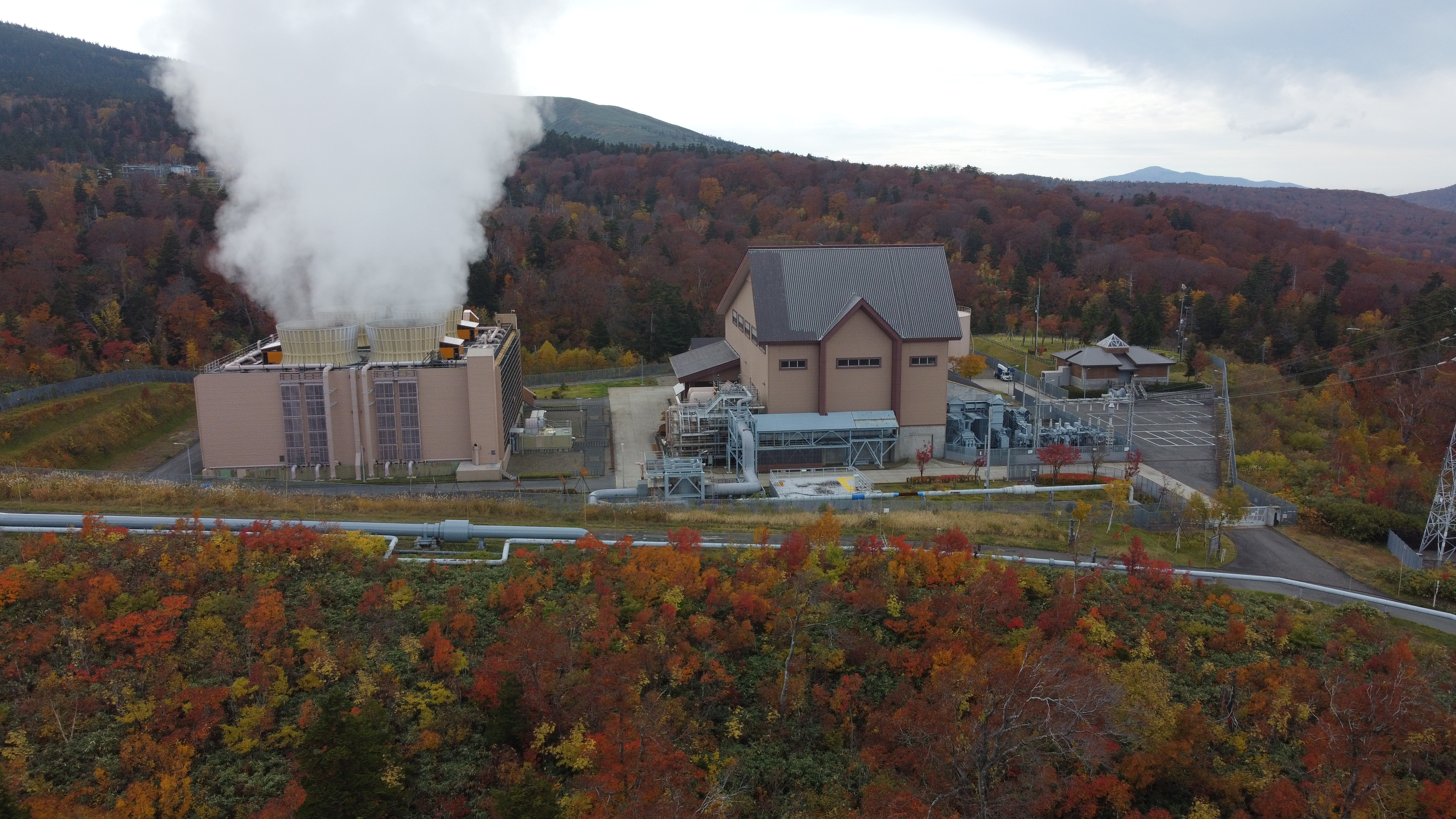
- Official name: 澄川地熱発電所
- Country: Japan
- Location: Kazuno, Akita, Japan
- Coordinates: 39°58′53.4″N 140°46′54.8″E
- Status: Operational
- Construction began: 1993
- Commission date: 1995
- Operator: Tohoku Electric Power

Power generation
- Nameplate capacity: 50 MW

External links
- Commons: Related media on Commons

The Sumikawa Geothermal Power Plant (Japanese: 澄川地熱発電所) is a geothermal power plant in Kazuno, Akita Prefecture, Japan.

== History ==
In 1981, Mitsubishi Metal Corporation began to conduct site survey of geothermal energy potential within the area. In 1990, a production test was performed to produce steam to generate power. The construction of the power plant then began in 1993. It was then commissioned in 1995.

== Technical specifications ==
The power plant has an installed generation capacity of 50 MW.

== See also ==
- Geothermal energy in Japan
- List of power stations in Japan
