= Japan Electric Power Exchange =

Company of Japan

Japan Electric Power Exchange, Public Interest incorporated organisation (Japanese:一般社団法人日本卸電力取引所（にっぽんおろしでんりょくとりひきしょ)、abbr: JEPX）is an exchange that facilitates with spot and forward transactions of electrical power by power among power utilities in Japan. Formed as an intermediary corporation in November 2003, it was based on the recommendation of the same year by the Electric-power Industry Sub-committee to form an electric power wholesale market. In 2004 it invited members for its central committee and in 2005 April 1, commenced transacting in wholesale power transactions. Later on, in November 2008, it also started a Green-power exchange. Pursuant to the change in Japan's corporate law for public interest organisations, it is now registered as a "Public Interest Incorporated Organization".

== Major constituent companies ==
It is mandatory to be a registered member in order to be able to conduct transactions. As of October 2017 there are 127 registered companies.

== See also ==
- Japan Electric Association
- Energy in Japan
- Electricity sector in Japan
