= Seto Windhill =

Wind farm in Ehime Prefecture, Japan

Coordinates: 33°26′8″N 132°13′24″E

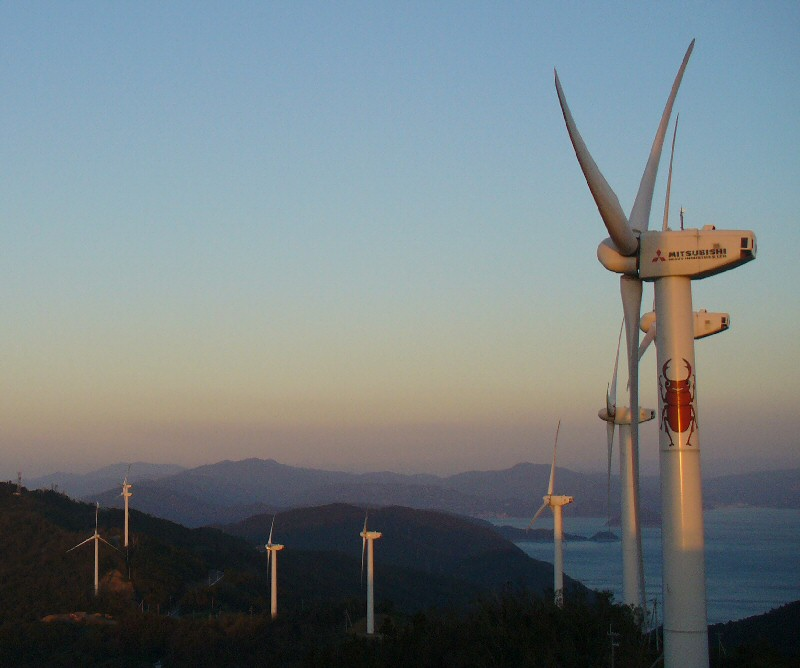
View from the neighboring park, taken on October 19, 2005

The Seto Windhill (瀬戸ウインドヒル発電所, Seto uindo hiru hatsudensho) is a collection of wind turbines located on the peaks of mountains along the Sadamisaki Peninsula, in the town of Ikata, Ehime Prefecture, Japan. The windfarm borders the Seto Wind Hill Park.

== Power production ==
The installation consists of 11 Mitsubishi Heavy Industries MWT-1000s with a nameplate capacity of 1000 kW. They were erected starting September 2002, and began full operation in October 2003.

== See also ==
- Nunobiki Plateau Wind Farm
- Aoyama Plateau Wind Farm
