= List of offshore wind farms in Japan =

This is a list of offshore wind farms in Japan. Japan intends to announce winners of a second contract round for 1.8 GW of capacity in March 2024.

== Operational ==
Wind farm	Prefecture	Wind turbine model	Unit power (MW)	No. of Units	Total (MW)	Commissioning date	Developer	Owner / operator	Coordinates	Notes and references
Setana Wind Farm	Hokkaido	Vestas V47	0.6	2	1.2					Close to shore
Sakata Offshore Wind Farm	Yamagata	Vestas V80	2.0	8 (3 onshore)	16					
Wind Power Kamisu	Ibaraki	Subaru 80	2	7	14	January 2008		Mitsuuroko Green Energy CO		Close to shore, survived exposure to the 2011 Tōhoku earthquake and tsunami.
Fukushima Floating Wind Turbine	Fukushima	Hitachi	2	1	2	November 2013				32% cf, 20 km from shore. 66kV floating transformer
Noshiro Port	Akita	Vestas	4.2	20	84	December 2022	Marubeni	Tohoku Electric Power	40°12′58.94″N 139°59′59.83″E	
Akita Port	Akita	Vestas	4.2	13	55	December 2022	Marubeni	Tohoku Electric Power	39°45′34.25″N 140°2′33.95″E	
Ishikari Bay	Hokkaido	Siemens Gamesa 8.0-167 DD	8.0	14	112	2023	Pattern Energy	JERA & NTT Anode Energy	43°20′N 141°7′E	3km from shore. 180MWh battery.
Gotō City Floating Offshore Wind Farm	Nagasaki prefecture	Hitachi	2.1	8	16.8	January 2026	TODA Corporation		32°39′N 128°58′E	Floating SPAR foundations. Downwind turbines.

== Planned ==
Wind farm project	Prefecture	Wind turbine model	Unit power (MW)	No. of Units	Total (MW)	Commissioning date	Developer	Owner / operator	Coordinates	Notes and references
Kitakyushu	Fukuoka			44				Kyuden Mirai		Cost 175bn yen ($1.5bn)
Yurihonjo	Akita	GE	12.6	65	819	2030	Mitsubishi	Chubu		JPY 12/kWh
Noshiro	Akita	GE	12.6	38	478	2028	Mitsubishi	Chubu		JPY 13/kWh
Choshi	Chiba	GE	12.6	31	390	2028	Mitsubishi			JPY 16/kWh

== See also ==
- Wind power in Japan
- List of wind farms
- List of offshore wind farms
- Lists of offshore wind farms by country
- Wind power
