= JEA (disambiguation) =

JEA is a municipal utility service in Jacksonville, Florida

JEA or Jea may also refer to:

- Jersey European Airways, defunct British airline
- JeA (born 1981), a South Korean singer and member of Brown Eyed Girls
- Jea, one half of Japanese electronic music collective DJ Sharpnel
- Japan Electric Association
- Japan Evangelical Association
- Jordanian Engineers Association
- John Emil Augustine
- Journal of Egyptian Archaeology, a scholarly journal on Egyptology
- Journalism Education Association, a national organization for teachers and advisers of journalism.
- Jerusalem Embassy Act of 1995, a public law of the United States initiating the relocation of its embassy in Israel from Tel Aviv to Jerusalem

== People with the surname Jea ==
- John Jea (born 1773), American slave and autobiographer
