= Hatchōbaru Geothermal Power Plant =

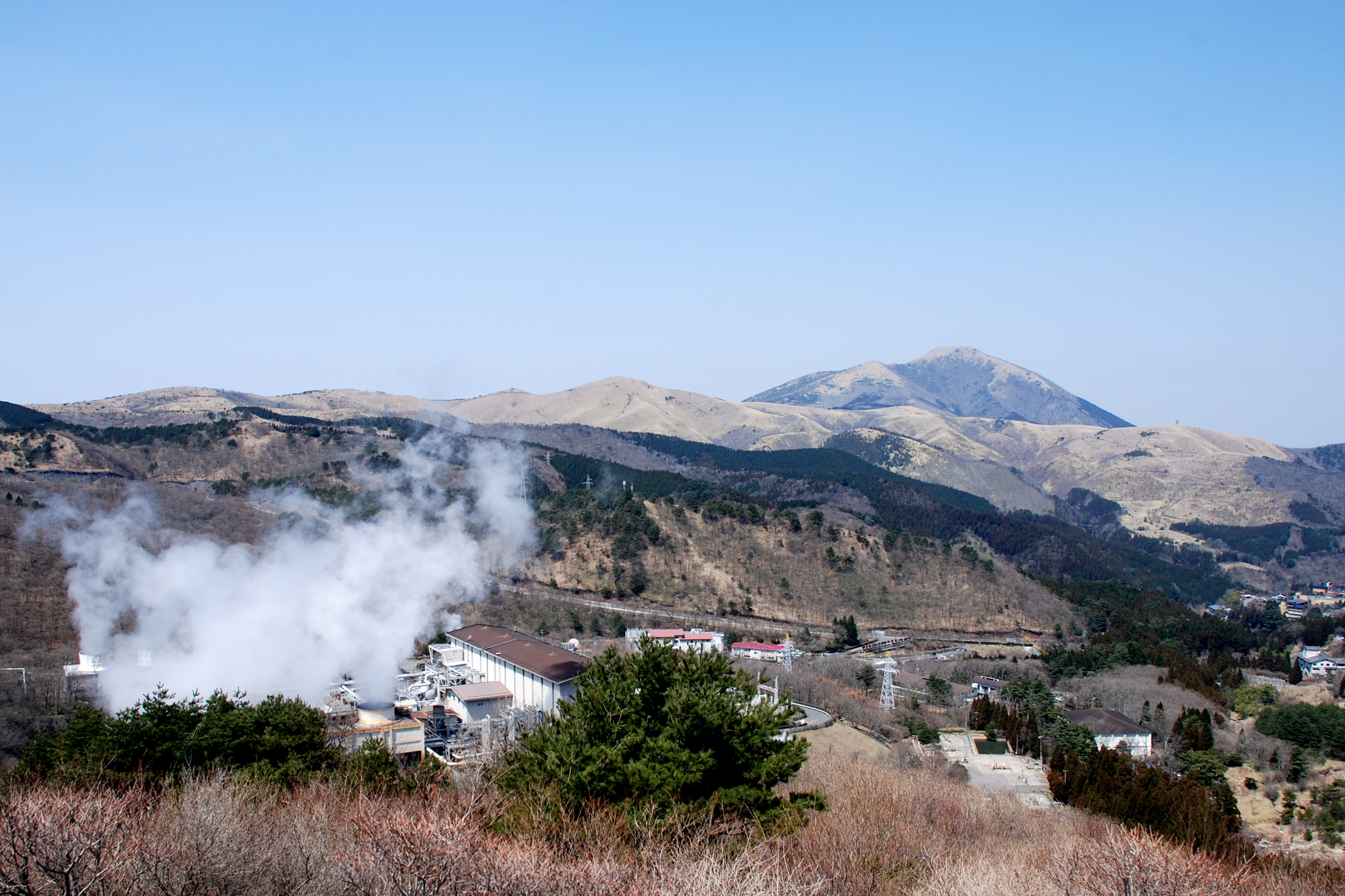
- Official name: 八丁原発電所
- Country: Japan
- Location: Ōita Prefecture
- Coordinates: 33°06′23″N 131°11′16″E
- Status: Operational
- Commission date: 1977
- Operator: Kyushu Electric Power Company (KEPCO)

Geothermal power station
- Type: Double flash, binary cycle
- Wells: 30
- Max. well depth: 3000 m

Power generation
- Nameplate capacity: 112 MW
- Annual net output: 785 GWh

The Hatchōbaru Geothermal Power Plant (八丁原発電所, Hatchōbaru Hatsudensho) is a large geothermal power station in Ōita Prefecture, Japan. At 112 MW, it is the largest geothermal power plant in the country. The plant comprises 3 generation units. The first unit, with a capacity of 55 MW, was activated in June 1977. A second unit started operation in June 1990, with an additional 55 MW capacity. A third binary unit rated at 2 MW is operational since April 2006. The first unit was among the first double flash geothermal generation units. The second unit is very similar to the first, with some technical improvements based on the experience gained from the operation of unit 1.

The power station is located in Kokonoe town, in the Aso Kujū National Park. Another geothermal power station, the Otake plant with a capacity of 12.5 MW, is located about 2 km from Hatchobaru plant. The location in a national park, and the presence of popular tourist attractions nearby, means that the plant is subject to strict limits and controls over location of wells, discharges, noise and visual distraction from the local scenery.

The plant is located in the vicinity of Mount Kujū, an active volcano. It generates electricity from high temperature steam from the site. The power plant is at an elevation of 1100 m and it is operated by remote control from the nearby Otake power plant. As of December 2008, there are 30 steam wells ranging in depth from 760 m to 3000 m and generating a total of 890 tons of steam per hour. The wells are concentrated in a relatively small area of about 1 km^{2}, due to terrain constraints: the plant is in a narrow valley in the Kuju mountain range.

As in other Japanese geothermal plants, the waste brine from Hatchobaru is used to produce hot water for local communities before being reinjected.

== See also ==
- Geothermal power in Japan
