= Geothermal power in Japan =

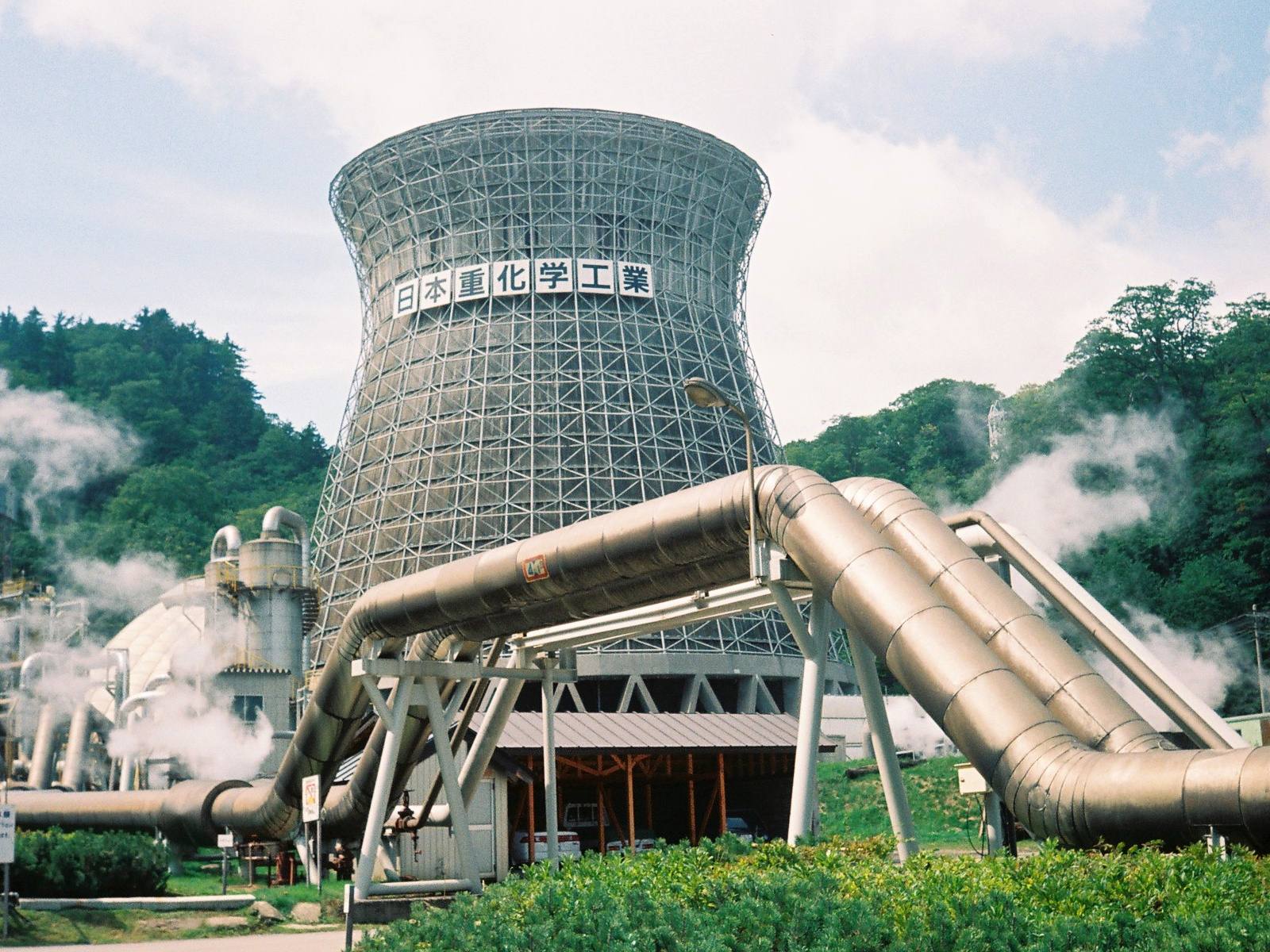
Matsukawa geothermal power station, the first commercial geothermal power station in Japan

Japan has favorable sites for geothermal power because of its proximity to the Izu–Bonin–Mariana Arc. Japan's geothermal energy sector leverages the nation's volcanic activity, which positions it among countries with high potential for Renewable energy development The Geography of Japan along the Pacific Ring of Fire, combined with its abundance of active volcanoes, creates ideal conditions for the development of geothermal power plants.

In 2007, Japan had 535.2 MW of installed electric generating capacity, about 5% of the world total. Geothermal power plays a minor role in the energy sector in the country: in 2013 it supplied 2596 GWh of electricity, representing about 0.25% of the country's total electricity supply.

Development of new geothermal power stations has slowed since the mid-1990s. Many potential sites are situated in government-protected areas and popular tourist destinations, including traditional hot springs or onsen. Hot springs are a notable aspect of Japan's onsen culture and are often considered in discussions about energy policy and geothermal development due to their cultural and economic roles. Local communities in these areas, which frequently depend on tourism revenue from onsen, have expressed reservations about the potential impact of geothermal projects on the landscape and the tourism industry. The Sumikawa Geothermal Power Station, located within Towada-Hachimantai National Park, is one of Japan's eighteen geothermal power sites and one of seven in the northern Honshu region (Tohoku). Operating since 1995, the Sumikawa Geothermal Power Station generates 50,000 kW of electrical energy and hot water, supporting the city of Kazuno and surrounding areas, home to approximately 32,000 residents.

Geothermal energy has been increasing in recent years due to the Japanese energy crisis following the Fukushima disaster and the subsequent closure of most of the country's nuclear power stations. Businesses and the government are currently considering over 60 possible sites for new geothermal power development. Estimated total capacity potential of geothermal power at 23 GW, the third largest amount in the world after the United States and Indonesia. Japan ranks third in the world in terms of geothermal potential, with more than 100 volcanoes contributing to its energy prospects. List of volcanoes in Japan.

== History ==
The country's first experimental geothermal power station was opened in 1925 in Beppu, Ōita Prefecture. Research in geothermal energy was slowed down by the Second World War. The first full scale geothermal power generation plant was Matsukawa in Iwate Prefecture, owned by Nihon Heavy Chemical Industry Corp. The plant started operating in 1966 with a capacity of 9.5 MW. In 1967, Otake Geothermal Power station in Ōita Prefecture, owned by Kyushu Electric Power, launched with 11 MW. After these first generation facilities, which were considered large scale experimental plants, from the mid-1970s new generation more efficient geothermal plants were opened. Until the mid-1980s, these were typically mid-sized plants with capacities of around 50 MW. Starting from the late 1980s more advanced technologies allowed for the economical exploration and development of even smaller geothermal resources, allowing the launch of several smaller scale plants. Total generation reached 500 MW in 1996.

In April 2011, Japanese Ministry of the Environment issued a "Study of Potential for the introduction of Renewable Energy" report. It has shown total 19.14GW of Japanese geothermal resource potential.

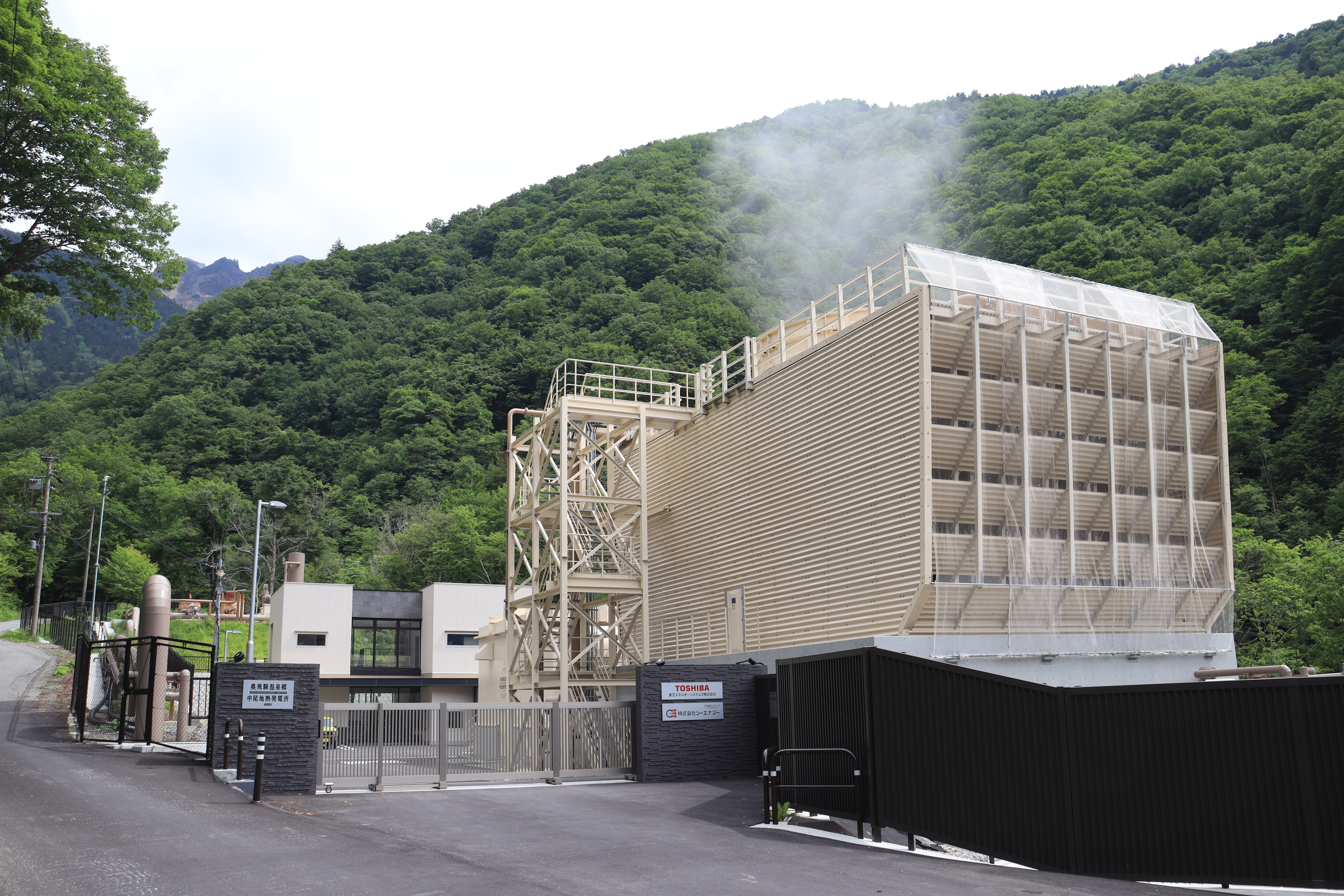
Nakao Geothermal Power Plant - Japan

== Power stations ==
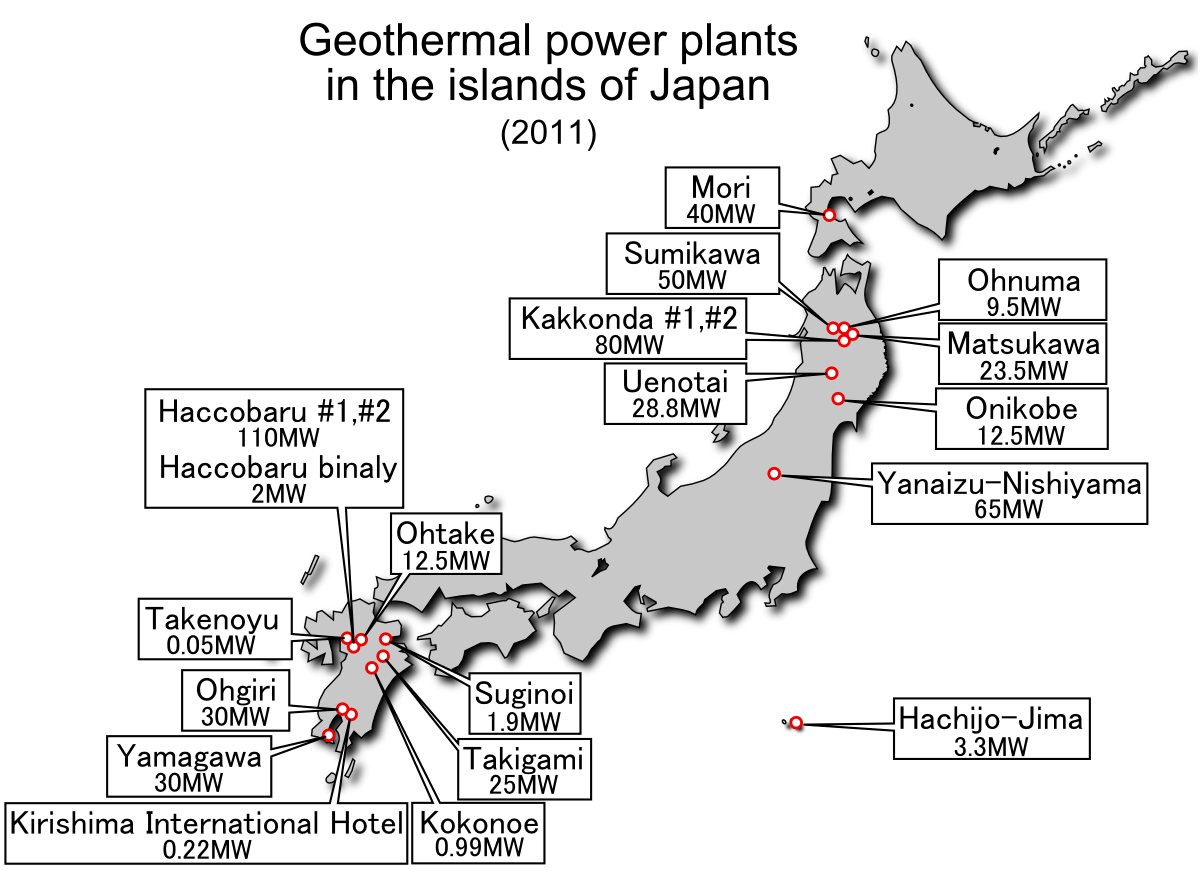
Geothermal power plants in the Islands of Japan

By 2022, Japan had established 98 geothermal power plants, collectively generating a capacity of about 540 MW. The country's geothermal journey began with the Matsukawa Geothermal Power Plant, which started operations in 1966 with an output of 23.5 MW. Among these facilities, the Hacchobaru Geothermal Power Plant stands out as the largest, boasting a total capacity of 110.2 MW. The Hatchobaru Geothermal Power Plant is currently the largest geothermal facility in the country, with a total capacity of 110.2 MW.

Name	Capacity (MWe)	Year	Notes
Mori	50	1982	
Onuma	9.5	1974	
Sumikawa	50	1995	
Matsukawa	23.5	1966	
Kakkonda 1 & 2	80	1978–1995	
Uenotai	28.8	1994	
Onikobe	15	1975	
Yanaizu-Nishiyama	65	1995	
Hachijō-jima	3.3	1999	
Suginoi	1.9	1981	
Takigami	25	1996	
Otake	12.5	1967	
Hatchōbaru 1 & 2	112	1977–2006	
Kujū	0.99	1998	
Takenoyu	0.1	1991	closed
Kirishima-kokuksai	0.1	1984	currently stopped
Ogiri	30	1996	
Yamagawa	30	1995	

== Technology ==
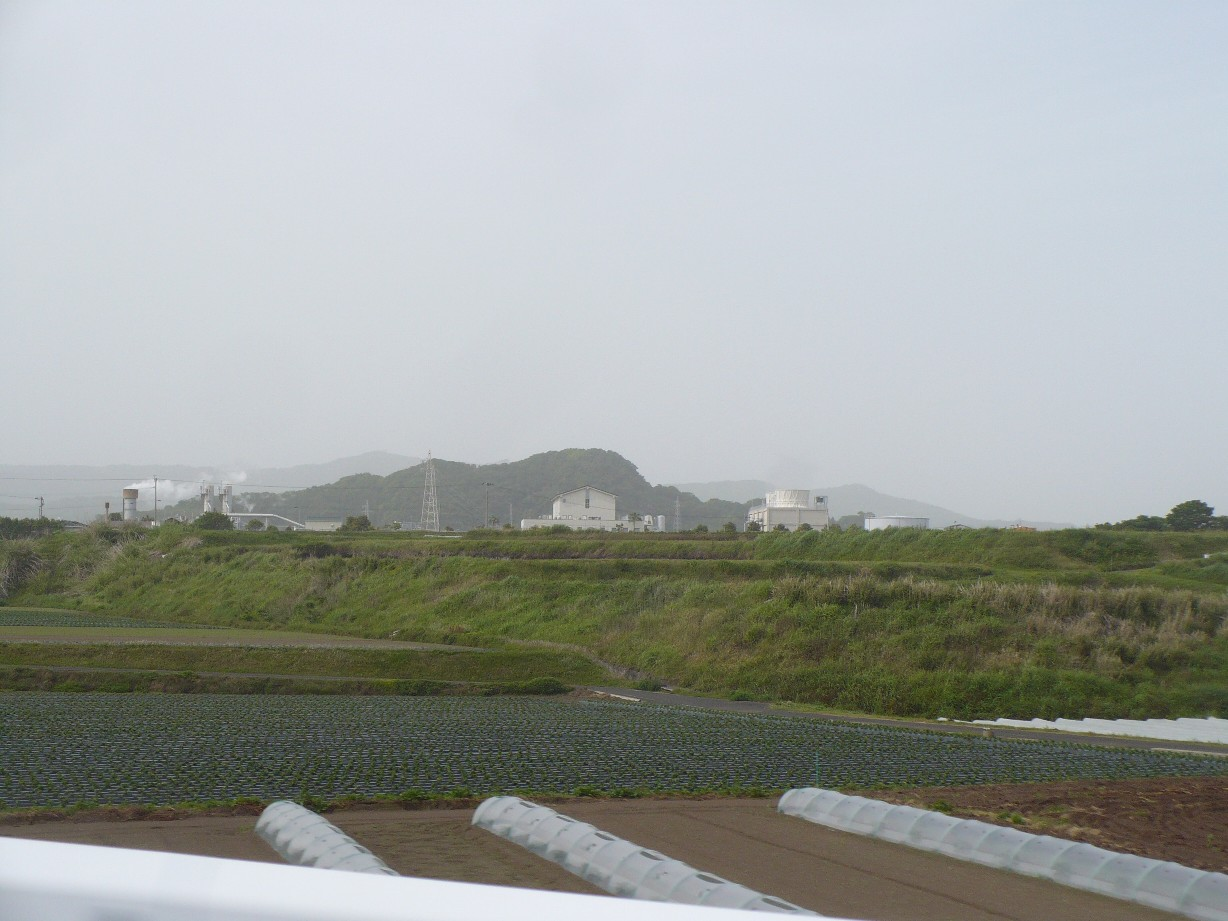
Yamagawa geothermal power station, opened in March 1995 with a capacity of 30 MW. It is one of the few plants located near the coast on flat land.

Japan has developed advanced technologies for the exploration, development, utilization and monitoring of geothermal resources. Due to the stagnant domestic geothermal sector, most of the technologies have been used in overseas development in recent years. Japan provided about 67% of all the turbines used in geothermal power stations in the world in the last 10 years. The Yamagawa Geothermal Power Station, began operations in March 1995 with a capacity of 30 MW, is among the few geothermal plants located near the coast on flat land. Sustainable sizing methods have been developed to optimize the potential of geothermal plants, efficient resource use and improved energy generation. Remote sensing techniques have been utilized to analyze heat discharge rates in geothermal areas, aiding in resource assessment and management. This approach contributes to plant efficiency and addressing operational challenges at facilities such as the Onuma Geothermal Power Plant in Japan.

== See also ==
- List of geothermal power stations
- Energy in Japan
- Electricity sector in Japan
- Hydroelectricity in Japan
- Solar power in Japan
- Wind power in Japan
- Renewable energy by country
