= Kabashima, Nagasaki =

Island in Amakusa, Nagasaki, Japan

Coordinates: 32.55000°N 129.80000°E

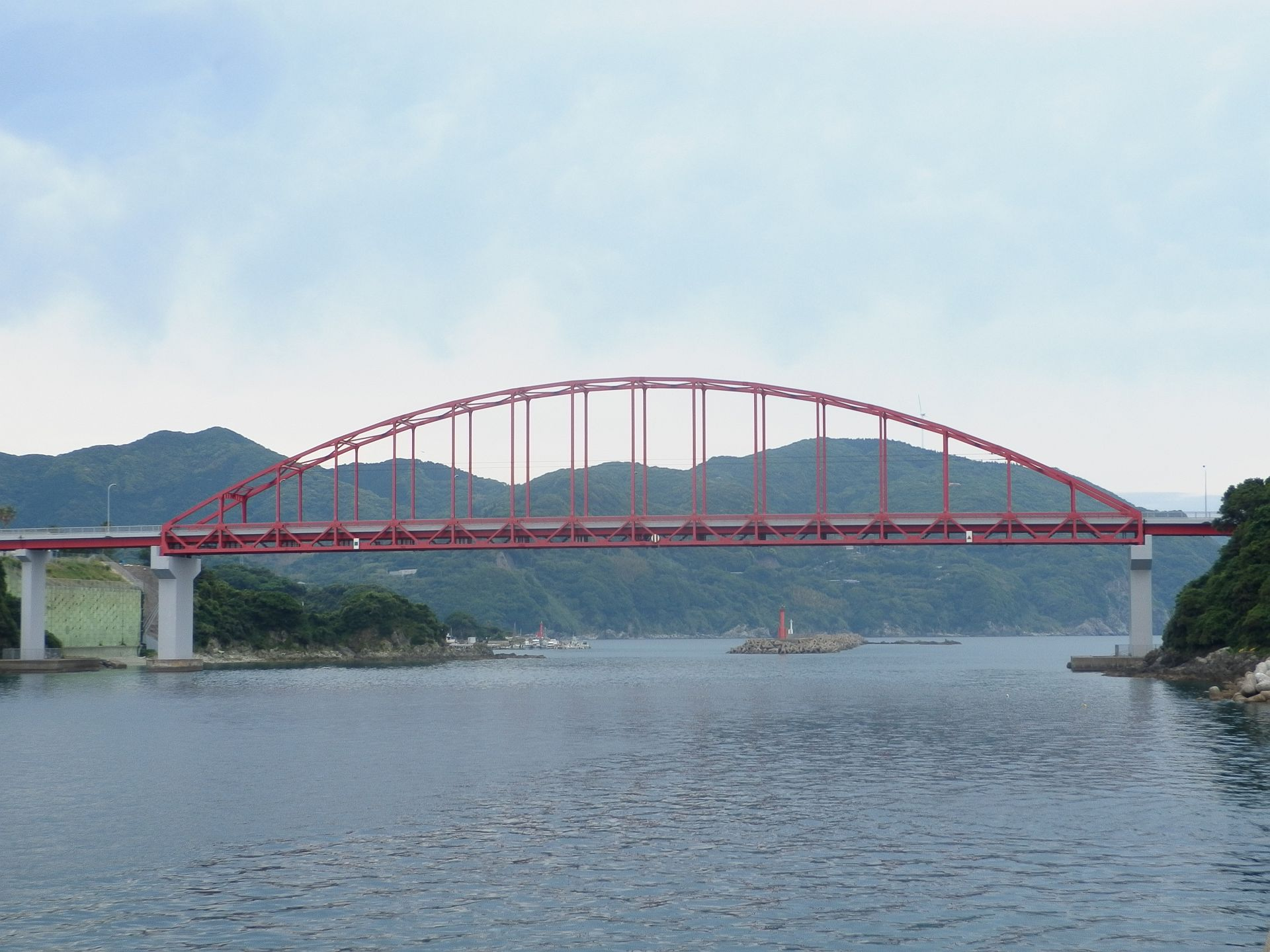
Kabashima Bridge

Kabashima (樺島), also known as Kabajima, is a small Japanese island off the southern coast of Nagasaki Prefecture on the Kyushu island.

== Geography ==
Kabashima is around 1.5 km in diameter and an area of around 2.4 km^{2}. It lies off the main coast of the Kyushu island, near the entrance of the Ariake Sea lagoon. It is connected with the Nomo Peninsula on mainland Kyushu through a causeway over an islet of Nakajima, and the Kabashima Bridge, constructed in 1986. The main settlement, home to about 110 households in 2013, is located in a harbor near the bridge.

Kabashima has steep hills 481 feet in height. East Rocks is a low reef which lies northeast of the island.

== Features ==
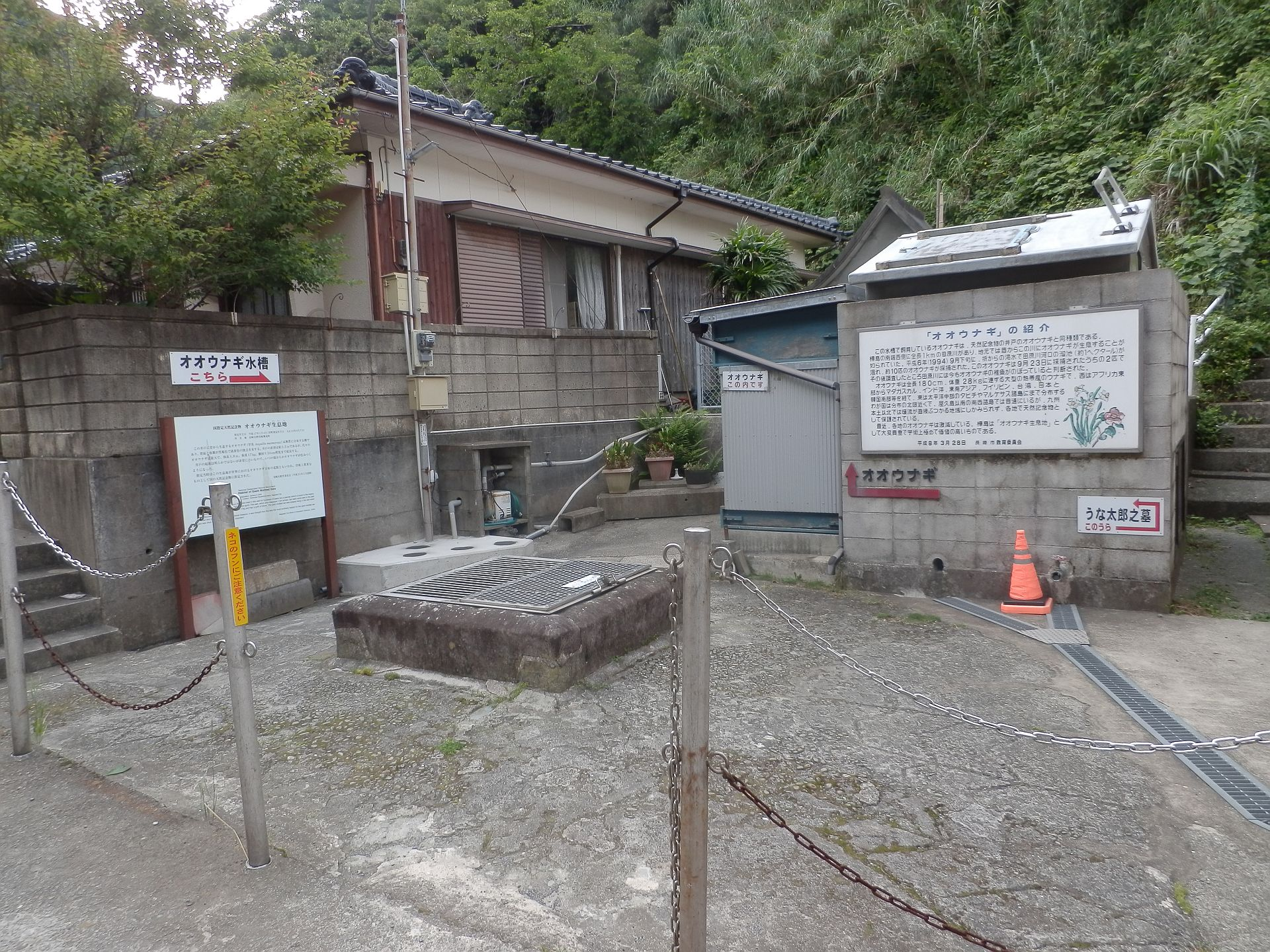
Habitat of the giant mottled eel

At the southern end of the island is the Kabashima lighthouse and accompanying Lighthouse Museum. The lighthouse was constructed in 1952, standing 100 meters above sea level, for ships sailing on the open sea about the Gotō Islands and Amakusa Islands.

The habitat of the giant mottled eel, a Natural Monument of Japan, is located on the island.

In 2013, a floating offshore wind turbine was tested about 1 km off the coast of the island. It was a part of a Japanese government test project. This was the first of its kind in Japan.

== See also ==
- Wind power in Japan
