= Nomo Peninsula =

Peninsula in Nagasaki Prefecture, Japan

Nomo Hantō Prefectural Natural Park
- 野母半島県立自然公園
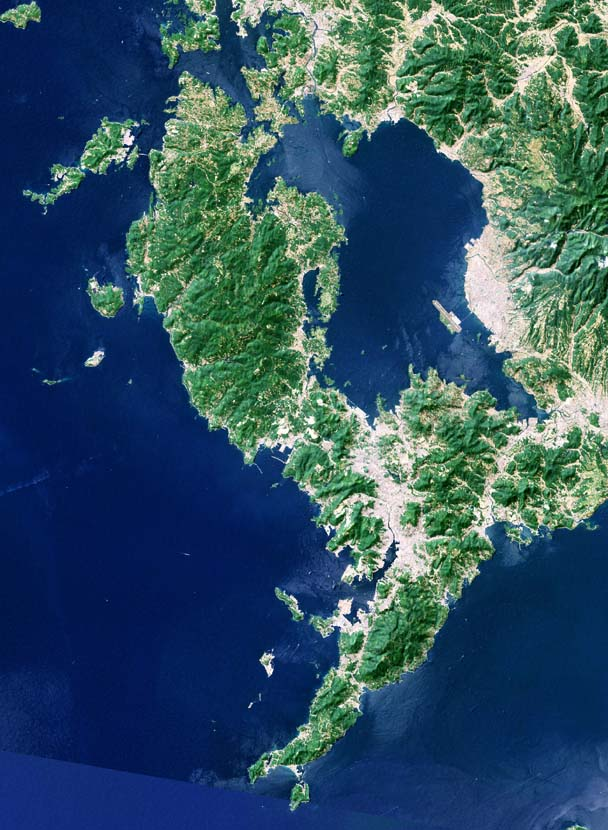
- the Nomo Peninsula at the southern part of photo, with the larger Nishisonogi Peninsula to the North-West above it.
- Interactive map of Nomo Hantō Prefectural Natural Park
- Location: Nagasaki Prefecture, Japan
- Area: 70.90 km^{2} (27.37 sq mi)
- Established: 13 October 1955

The Nomo Peninsula in southern Nagasaki Prefecture, Kyushu, Japan is a peninsula extending 17 miles (27 km) south from the city center of downtown Nagasaki to Nomomachi on Kokudō 499.

A large part of the peninsula is occupied by the Nomo Hantō Prefectural Natural Park (野母半島県立自然公園, Nomo Hantō kenritsu shizen kōen) which is a Prefectural Natural Park established in 1955.

The southernmost tip of the peninsula ends at the village of Nomomachi, with Mt. Gongen park area on the western side and Wakimisaki-machi on the south-eastern point, from where Kabashima Island is accessible by a permanent bridge.

== See also ==
- National Parks of Japan
