= Nishisonogi Peninsula =

Japanese peninsula

Coordinates: 33°05′59″N 129°40′45″E

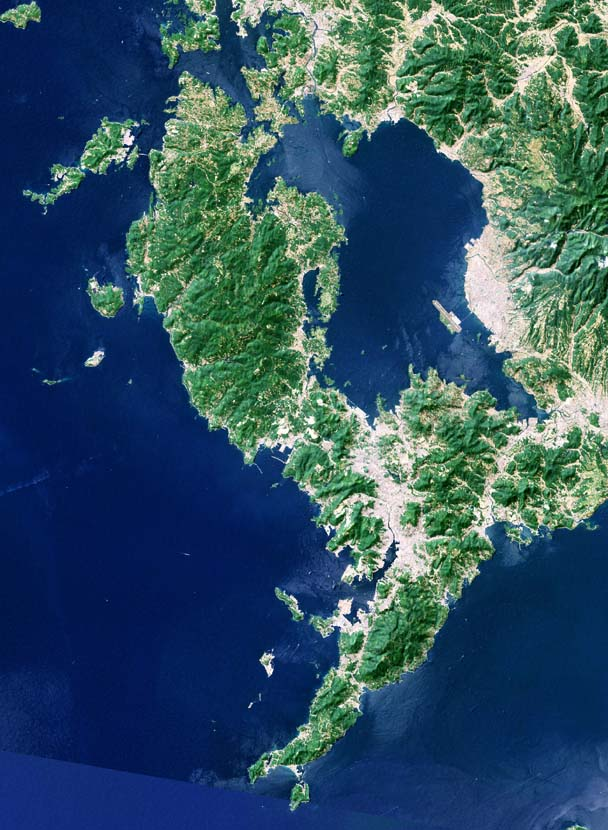
Nishisonogi Peninsula (top) and Nagasaki Peninsula (bottom) (Landsat image)

The Nishisonogi Peninsula (西彼杵半島, Nishi sonogi hantō), also called Seihi Peninsula (西彼半島, Seihi hantō), is a peninsula in northwest Kyūshū, Japan. It is the north-northwesterly fork of a larger peninsula which also includes Nagasaki and the Nomo Peninsula. To its west is the East China Sea, while to the east it encloses Ōmura Bay.

== History ==
In the Gusuku Period, stone cooking pots or ishinabe (石鍋) were made from talc stone mined on the Nishisonogi Peninsula and distributed widely; the ishinabe have been found in the Kantō region and as far as Hateruma in the Ryukyu Islands.

=== Christianity ===
Like many other areas in Nagasaki Prefecture, the now-dissolved municipality of Sotome in Nishisonogi Peninsula was an area with a number of Kakure Kirishitans, Japanese Christians who went into hiding during the Edo Period. When the prohibition against Christianity was revoked in 1873, the Kakure Kirishitans of Sotome, as well as Hirado, Shimogoto, and Ikitsuki, continued following their unique religious traditions, although these had diverged significantly from mainstream Christianity over time.

Location in southwest Japan
