= Ishikari Bay New Port Offshore Wind Farm =

Offshore wind farm off Hokkaido, Japan

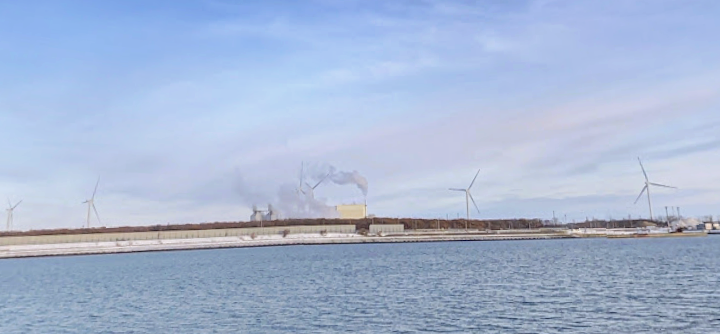
- Ishikari Bay Offshore Wind Farm
- Country: Japan
- Location: Sea of Japan
- Coordinates: 43°20′N 141°7′E
- Status: Operational
- Construction began: September 2022
- Commission date: January 2024
- Owners: JERA Nex bp; NTT Anode Energy
- Operator: Green Power Ishikari LLC

Wind farm
- Type: Offshore
- Distance from shore: 3 km
- Hub height: 90 m
- Rotor diameter: 167 m
- Site area: 5 km^{2} (2 mi^{2})

Power generation
- Units operational: 14 x 8MW
- Make and model: SG 8.0-167 DD
- Nameplate capacity: 112MW

External links
- Website: JERA Projects - Ishikari Bay

The Ishikari Bay New Port Offshore Wind Farm is an offshore wind farm off Ishikari Bay, Ishikari, Hokkaido, Japan. As of May 2024, it is, at 112MW, the largest commercial offshore wind farm in Japan.

The project was originally developed by Green Power Investment Corporation (GPI), the Japanese affiliate of Pattern Energy. The project ownership changed upon the sale in May 2023 of GPI to JERA - the joint venture of TEPCO Fuel & Power and Chubu Electric Power - and NTT Anode Energy. The duo reportedly paid more than $US 2bn for GPI.

The project uses the typhoon and seismic certified SG 8.0-167 DD offshore wind turbine from Siemens Gamesa (where DD denotes its gearbox-less direct drive generator). It is the first project in Japan to use 8MW turbines. Due to limited electrical transmission capacity to Honshu, and Hokkaido's relatively small, mainly rural, population, the local Transmission System Operator requires that all major renewable generator directly connect projects to a Battery Energy Storage System (BESS), and so the Ishikari Bay project is paired to a 100MW/180MWh BESS.

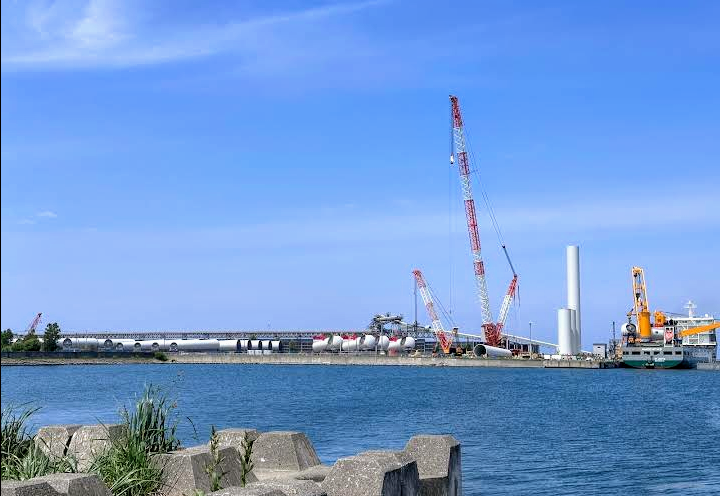
Ishikari Bay offshore wind farm under construction at Ishikari Bay New Port

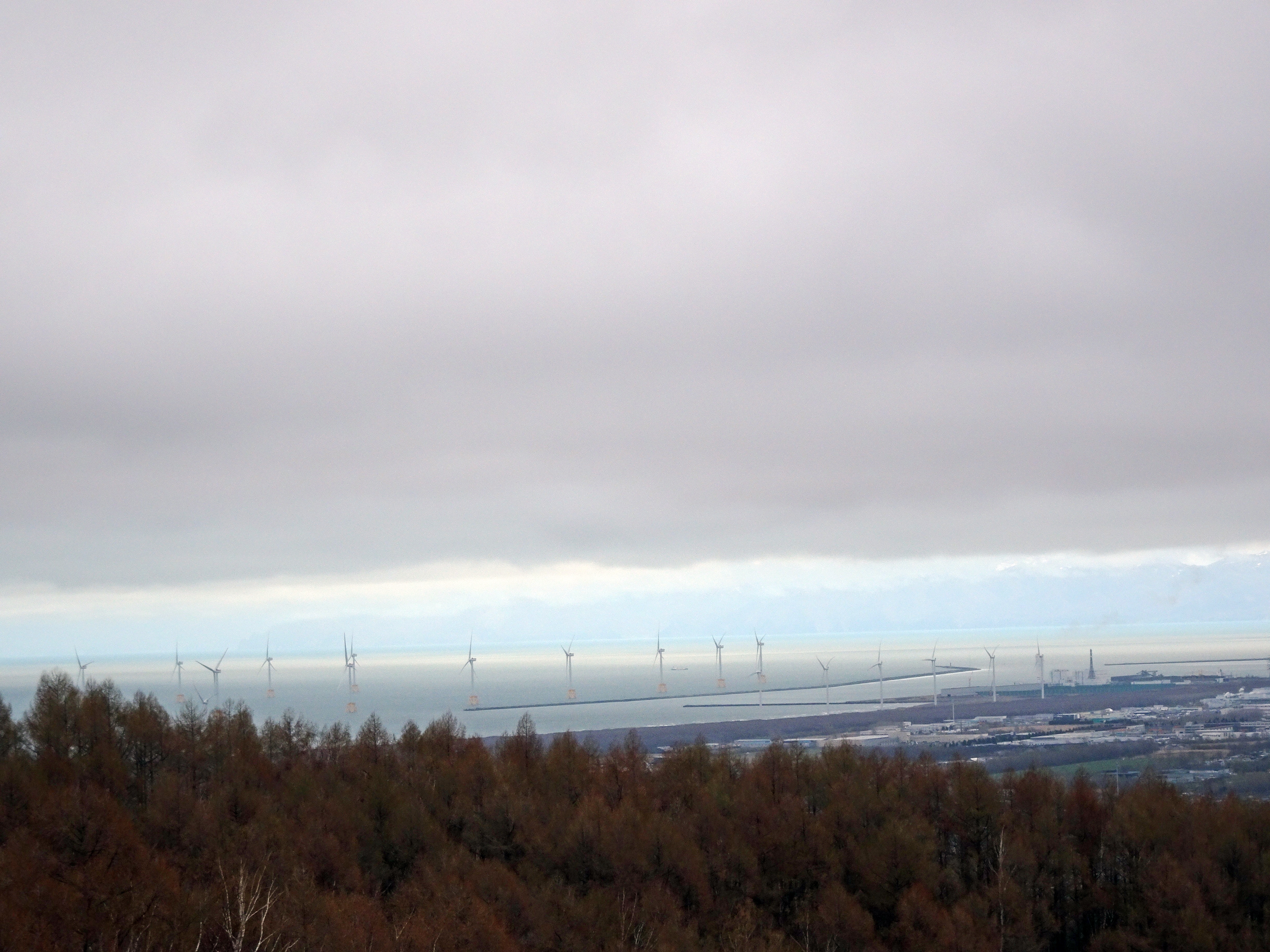
Ishikari Bay offshore wind farm during commissioning
