= Nunobiki Plateau Wind Farm =

Wind farm in Japan

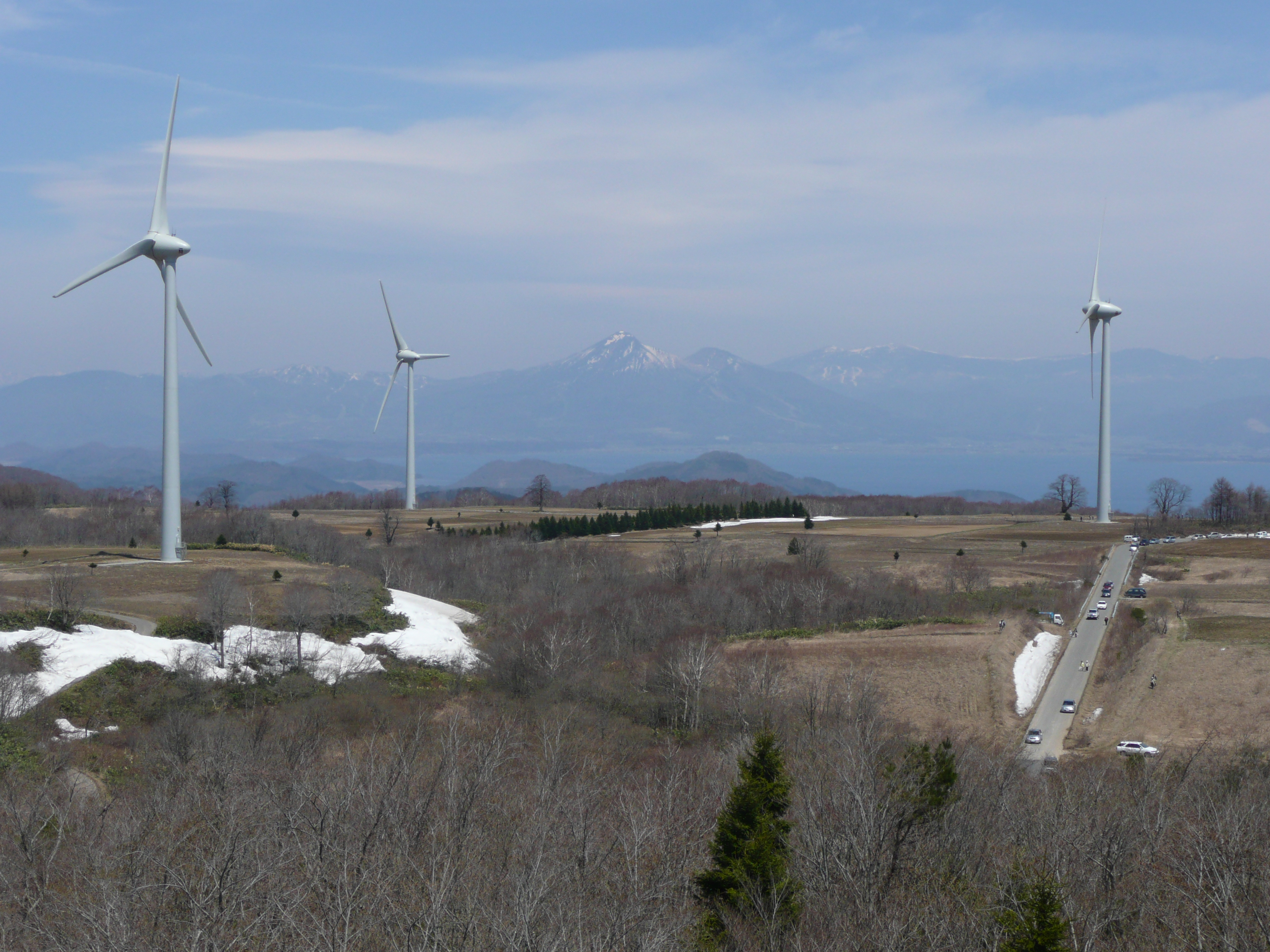
- A view of Mount Bandai from the wind farm
- Official name: 郡山布引高原風力発電所
- Country: Japan
- Location: Kōriyama, Fukushima
- Coordinates: 37°20′04″N 140°02′47.9″E
- Status: Operational
- Commission date: February 2007
- Owner: J-Power
- Operator: J-Power

Wind farm
- Type: Onshore
- Hub height: 100 m
- Rotor diameter: 30 m
- Site elevation: 1,080 m (3,540 ft)

Power generation
- Make and model: Enercon: E-70
- Units under const.: 33 units
- Annual net output: 65,980 KW

External links
- Website: www.jpower.co.jp/wind/win01000.html
- Commons: Related media on Commons

The Nunobiki Highlands Wind Farm (郡山布引高原風力発電所, Kōriyama Nunobiki Fūryoku-hatsudensho) is a wind farm operated by the electric utility company J-Power alongside Lake Inawashiro in Kōriyama, Fukushima, Japan. It is approximately 1,080 meters above sea level.

The wind farm produces 65.98 megawatts of power using a total of 33 type Enercon E-70, wind turbines, and generates enough power for approximately 35,000 houses.

The facility began operating in February 2007. Each wind turbine is about 100 meters high, and each turbine blade is about 30 meters long.

== See also ==
- Aoyama Plateau Wind Farm
- Seto Wind Farm
