= Electricity sector in Japan =

Electricity sector of Japan
Data
- Production (2024): 981.993 TWh
- Share of renewable energy: 9.26% (2022)

Electricity production in Japan by source.

The electric power industry in Japan covers the generation, transmission, distribution, and sale of electric energy in Japan. Japan's electricity demand was approximately 805.9 terawatt-hours (TWh) in 2024. Before the 2011 Fukushima Daiichi nuclear disaster, about a quarter of electricity in the country was generated by nuclear power. In the following years, most nuclear power plants have been on hold, being replaced mostly by coal and natural gas. Solar power is a growing source of electricity, and Japan has the third largest solar installed capacity with about 50 GW as of 2017. Japan's electricity production is characterized by a diverse energy mix, including nuclear, fossil fuels, renewable energy, and hydroelectric power. Japan has the second largest pumped-hydro storage installed capacity in the world after China.

The electrical grid in Japan is isolated, with no international connections, and consists of four wide area synchronous grids. Unusually, the Eastern and Western grids run at different frequencies (50 and 60 Hz respectively) and are connected by HVDC connections. This considerably limits the amount of electricity that can be transmitted between the north and south of the country.

== Consumption ==
In 2008, Japan consumed an average of 8507 kWh/person of electricity. That was 115% of the EU15 average of 7409 kWh/person and 95% of the OECD average of 8991 kWh/person.

Electricity per person in Japan (kWh/ hab.)
	Use	Production	Import	Imp. %	Fossil	Nuclear	Nuc. %	Other RE	Bio+waste*	Wind	Non RE use*	RE %
2004	8,459	8,459	0		5,257	2,212	26.1%	844	146		7,469	11.7%
2005	8,633	8,633	0		5,378	2,387	27.6%	715	153		7,765	10.1%
2006	9,042	9,042	0		6,105	2,066	22.8%	716	154		8,171	9.6%
2008	8,507	8,507	0		5,669	2 010	23.6%	682	147		7,679	9.7%
2009	8,169	8,169	0		5,178	2,198	26.9%	637*	128	27*	7,377	9.7%
* Other RE is waterpower, solar and geothermal electricity and wind power until 2008 * Non RE use = use – production of renewable electricity * RE % = (production of RE / use) * 100% Note: European Union calculates the share of renewable energies in gross electrical consumption.

Compared with other nations, electricity in Japan is relatively expensive.

== History ==
=== Beginnings ===
A Japanese-made electric generator in northern Sakhalin c. 1924

Japan was a pioneer in electrification. Japan's first electric utility, Tokyo Electric Light, started 1883, about the same time as western countries such as Britain, Germany, and the USA. The first transmission line went into service between Komabashi and Tokyo with a voltage of 55 kV in 1907 and a 115 kV transmission line from Inawashiro to Tokyo in 1913. In 1935 Japan was one of the most electrified countries with 89% of households connected to electricity. Though rivalry of concurrent power operators and a lack of frequency standardization hampered the creation of a national transmission grid. In 1929, most regions had parallel grids, one for 50 Hz and one for 60 Hz, served by various private companies.

=== Second world war ===
During the Second Sino-Japanese War and the succeeding Pacific War, the entirety of Japan's electricity sector was state-owned; the system at the time consisted of a Japan Electric Generation and Transmission Company (日本発送電株式会社, Nippon Hassōden kabushiki gaisha; otherwise known as Nippon Hassōden KK or Nippatsu) and several electricity distributors. At the behest of the Supreme Commander for the Allied Powers, Nippon Hassōden became the Electric Power Development Co., Limited in the fifties; and almost all of the electricity sector that are not under the control by EPDC was privatized into nine government-granted monopolies. The Ryukyu Islands electricity provider was, during the USCAR era, publicly owned; it was privatized shortly after the islands' admission into Japan.

=== Liberalization of the electricity market ===
Since the Fukushima Daiichi nuclear disaster, and the subsequent large scale shutdown on the nuclear power industry, Japan's ten regional electricity operators have been making very large financial losses, larger than US$15 billion in both 2012 and 2013.

Since then steps have been made to liberalize the electricity supply market. In April 2016 domestic and small business mains voltage customers became able to select from over 250 supplier companies competitively selling electricity, but many of them sell only locally, mainly in large cities. Also wholesale electricity trading on the Japan Electric Power Exchange (JEPX), which previously traded only 1.5% of power generation, was encouraged. By June 2016 more than 1 million consumers had changed supplier. However total costs of liberalization to that point were around ¥80 billion, so it is unclear if consumers had benefited financially.

In 2020 transmission and distribution infrastructure access will be made more open, which will help competitive suppliers cut costs.

== Transmission ==
Map of Japan's electricity transmission network, showing differing systems between regions

Electricity transmission in Japan is unusual because the country is divided for historical reasons into two regions each running at a different mains frequency. Eastern Japan has 50 Hz networks while western Japan has 60 Hz networks. Limitations of conversion capacity causes a bottleneck to transfer electricity and shift imbalances between the networks.

Eastern Japan (consisting of Hokkaido, Tohoku, Kanto, and eastern parts of Chubu) runs at 50 Hz; Western Japan (including most of Chubu, Kansai, Chugoku, Shikoku, and Kyushu) runs at 60 Hz. That originates from the first purchases of generators from AEG for Tokyo in 1895 and from General Electric for Osaka in 1896.

The frequency difference partitions Japan's national grid and so power can be moved only between the two parts of the grid using frequency converters, or HVDC transmission lines. The boundary between the two regions has four back-to-back HVDC substations, which convert the frequency: Shin Shinano, Sakuma Dam, Minami-Fukumitsu, and the Higashi-Shimizu Frequency Converter. The total transmission capacity between the two grids is 1.2 GW.

The limitations of these links have been a major problem in providing power to the areas of Japan affected by the Fukushima Daiichi nuclear disaster. During the 2011 Tōhoku earthquake and tsunami, there were blackouts in some areas of the country because of the insufficient ability of the three HVDC converter stations to transfer energy between the two networks.

A few projects are underway to increase the electricity transfer between the 50 Hz (eastern Japan) and 60 Hz networks (western Japan) which will improve power reliability in Japan. In April 2019, Hitachi ABB HVDC Technologies secured an HVDC order for the Higashi Shimizu project to increase the interconnection capacity between the 60 Hz area of Chubu Electric and the 50 Hz area of TEPCO from 1.2 GW to 3 GW. Chubu Electric will increase the interconnection capacity of the Higashi Shimizu Substation from 300 MW to 900 MW which should be operational by 2027. OCCTO (Organization for Cross-regional Coordination of Transmission Operators) supervises the power interchange among electric power companies.

== Mode of production ==
Gross production of electricity by source in Japan (TWh)
Year	Total	Coal		Gas		Oil		Nuclear		Hydro		Solar		Wind		Geothermal		Biofuels	
2004	1,121	294	26.2%	256	22.9%	169	15.0%	282	25.2%	103	9.2%								
2008	1,108	300	27.1%	292	26.3%	154	13.9%	258	23.3%	84	7.5%								
2009	1,075	290	27.0%	302	28.1%	98	9.1%	280	26.0%	84	7.8%								
2010	1,148	310	27.0%	319	27.8%	100	8.7%	288	25.1%	91	7.9%	3.800	0.33%	3.962	0.35%	2.647	0.23%		
2011	1,082	291	26.9%	388	35.8%	166	15.4%	102	9.4%	92	8.5%	5.160	0.48%	4.559	0.42%	2.676	0.25%		
2012	1,064	314	29.5%	409	38.4%	195	18.3%	16	1.5%	84	7.9%	6.963	0.65%	4.722	0.44%	2.609	0.24%		
2013	1,066	349	32.7%	408	38.2%	160	15.0%	9	0.9%	85	8.0%	14.279	1.34%	4.286	0.4%	0.296	0.03%		
2014	1,041	349	33.5%	421	40.4%	116	11.2%	0	0%	87	8.4%	24.506	2.35%	5.038	0.48%	2.577	0.25%		
2015	1,009	342	34.0%	396	39.2%	91	9.0%	9	0.9%	85	8.4%	35.858	3.55%	5.16	0.51%	2.582	0.26%		
2018	1,067	332	31.1%	406	38.0%	44.6	4.2%	64.9	6.1%	88.4	8.3%	62.667	5.87%	7.481	0.7%	2.524	0.23%	19.2	1.80%
2019	1,039	327	31.5%																
2020	1,017	311	30.6%																
2021	1,050	321	30.6%																
2022	1,018	308	30.3%																
2023	1,003	284	28.3%	331	33.0%	30.2	3.0%	84.0	8.38%	85	8.5%	96.459	9.62%	10.491	1.05%	3.399	0.34%	39.09	3.90%
2024	982	295	30.1%	293	29.9%	22.4	2.3%	93.5	9.5%	85.3	8.7%	97.894	10%	11.984	1.22%	3.870	0.39%	38.28	3.90%

According to the International Energy Agency, Japanese gross production of electricity was 1,041 TWh in 2009, making it the world's third largest producer of electricity with 5.2% of the world's electricity. After Fukushima, Japan imported an additional 10 million short tons of coal and liquefied natural gas imports rose 24% between 2010 and 2012. In 2012 Japan used most of its natural gas (64%) in the power sector.

=== Nuclear power ===
Nuclear power was a national strategic priority in Japan. Following the 2011 Fukushima nuclear accidents, the national nuclear strategy is in doubt due to increasing public opposition to nuclear power. An energy white paper, approved by the Japanese Cabinet in October 2011, reported that "public confidence in safety of nuclear power was greatly damaged" by the Fukushima disaster, and it calls for a reduction in the nation's reliance on nuclear power.

Following the 2011 accident, many reactors were shut down for inspection and for upgrades to more stringent safety standards. By October 2011, only 11 nuclear power plants were operating in Japan, and all 50 nuclear reactors were offline by 15 September 2013. That left Japan without nuclear energy for only the second time in almost 50 years. Carbon dioxide emissions from the electricity industry rose in 2012, reaching levels 39% more than when the reactors were in operation.

Sendai 1 reactor was restarted on 11 August 2015, the first reactor to meet new safety standards and be restarted after the shutdown. As of July 2018, there are nine reactors that have been restarted.

=== Hydro power ===
Hydroelectricity is Japan's main renewable energy source, with an installed capacity of about 27 GW, or 16% of the total generation capacity, of which about half is pumped-storage. The production was 73 TWh in 2010. As of September 2011, Japan had 1,198 small hydropower plants with a total capacity of 3,225 MW. The smaller plants accounted for 6.6 percent of Japan's total hydropower capacity. The remaining capacity was filled by large and medium hydropower stations, typically sited at large dams.

=== Other renewables ===
Benjamin K. Sovacool estimated that Japan has a total of "324 GW of achievable potential in the form of onshore and offshore wind turbines (222 GW), geothermal power plants (70 GW), additional hydroelectric capacity (26.5 GW), solar energy (4.8 GW) and agricultural residue (1.1 GW)."

One result of the Fukushima Daiichi nuclear disaster could be renewed public support for the commercialization of renewable energy technologies. The Japanese government announced in May 2011 a goal of producing 20% of the nation's electricity from renewable sources, including solar, wind, and biomass, by the early 2020s. In August 2011, the Japanese Government passed a bill to subsidize electricity from renewable energy sources. The legislation will become effective on 1 July 2012, and require utilities to buy electricity generated by renewable sources including solar power, wind power and geothermal energy at above-market rates.

In 2011 Japan planned to build as many as 80 floating wind turbines off Fukushima by 2020. In 2020, seven years after the world's first pilot floating wind turbine was installed off Fukushima in 2013, the Japanese government announced its withdrawal from the offshore wind farm.

== Grid storage ==
Japan relies mostly on pumped storage hydroelectricity to balance demand and supply. As of 2014, Japan has the largest pumped storage capacity in the world, with over 27 GW.

== See also ==
- Japan Electric Association
- Energy in Japan
