= Japan Electric Association =

The Japan Electric Association (日本電気協会) (JEA) is a membership organisation for the electricity sector in Japan and, although it has roots dating back to 1892, was founded in October 1921. It currently has around 4,800 corporate and individual members.

== Activities ==
The JCA has a number of committees that set national technical guidelines (JEAGs), codes (JEACs) and standards covering areas ranging from electrical safety to the design of nuclear power stations some of which are regarded as optional 'independent standards of the private sectors' while others have official status as the 'standards of academic societies and associations'.

The JCA also acts as the main lobby group for the Japanese power companies and is active in promoting nuclear power.

Among its other work, the JCA promotes education, publishes a range of books and guides, and holds lectures, seminars and cultural events. Since 1942 the ECA has published The Denki Shimbun (The Electric Daily News), founded in 1907 as the Electrical News.

=== Nuclear power ===
Through the work of its committees, the JCA prepares and publishes a number of codes and guides for the Japanese nuclear power industry, including the Rules of Quality Assurance for Safety of Nuclear Power Plants (JEAC 4111–2003) and the Guideline for Development and Design of Computerized Human-Machine Interface in the Central Control Room (JEAG 4617–2005), intended to meet the performance requirements specified under the Electricity Utilities Industry Law As of 2007, the Nuclear and Industrial Safety Agency were engaged in the process of evaluating certain standards produced by the JEA and others for technical adequacy.

There have been allegations that the JEA wields too much power in setting standards. Professor Katsuhiko Ishibashi, one of the seismologists on a Japanese government subcommittee that produced the 2006 Regulatory Guide for Reviewing Seismic Design of Nuclear Power Reactor Facilities claimed that the review process was 'unscientific' and the outcome rigged to suit the interests of the JEA, which had 11 of its committee members on the 19-member government subcommittee and that among other problems the guide was 'seriously flawed' as a consequence because it underestimated the design basis earthquake ground motion.

== History ==
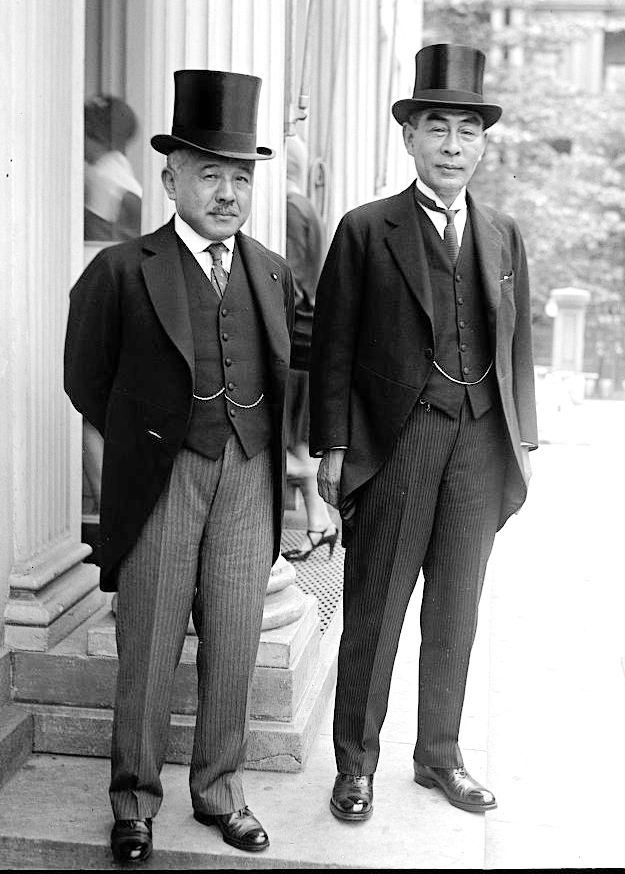
Yasuzaemon Matsunaga (right), former JEA president, pictured with diplomat Katsuyi Debuchi (left)

Between 1923 and January 1, 1965, the JEA was one of the bodies authorised to inspect electricity meters, a function subsequently transferred to the Japan Electric Meters Inspection Corporation (JEMIC).

The Japan Electrical Safety & Environment Technology Laboratories (JET) were founded as the Japan Electrical Testing Laboratories of Japan Electric Association in February 1963.

=== Past presidents ===
- Goro Inoue
- Yasuzaemon Matsunaga

== See also ==
- Electricity sector in Japan
- Energy in Japan
- Nuclear power in Japan
