= Aoyama Plateau Wind Farm =

Large wind farm in Japan

Coordinates: 34°42′40″N 136°17′34″E

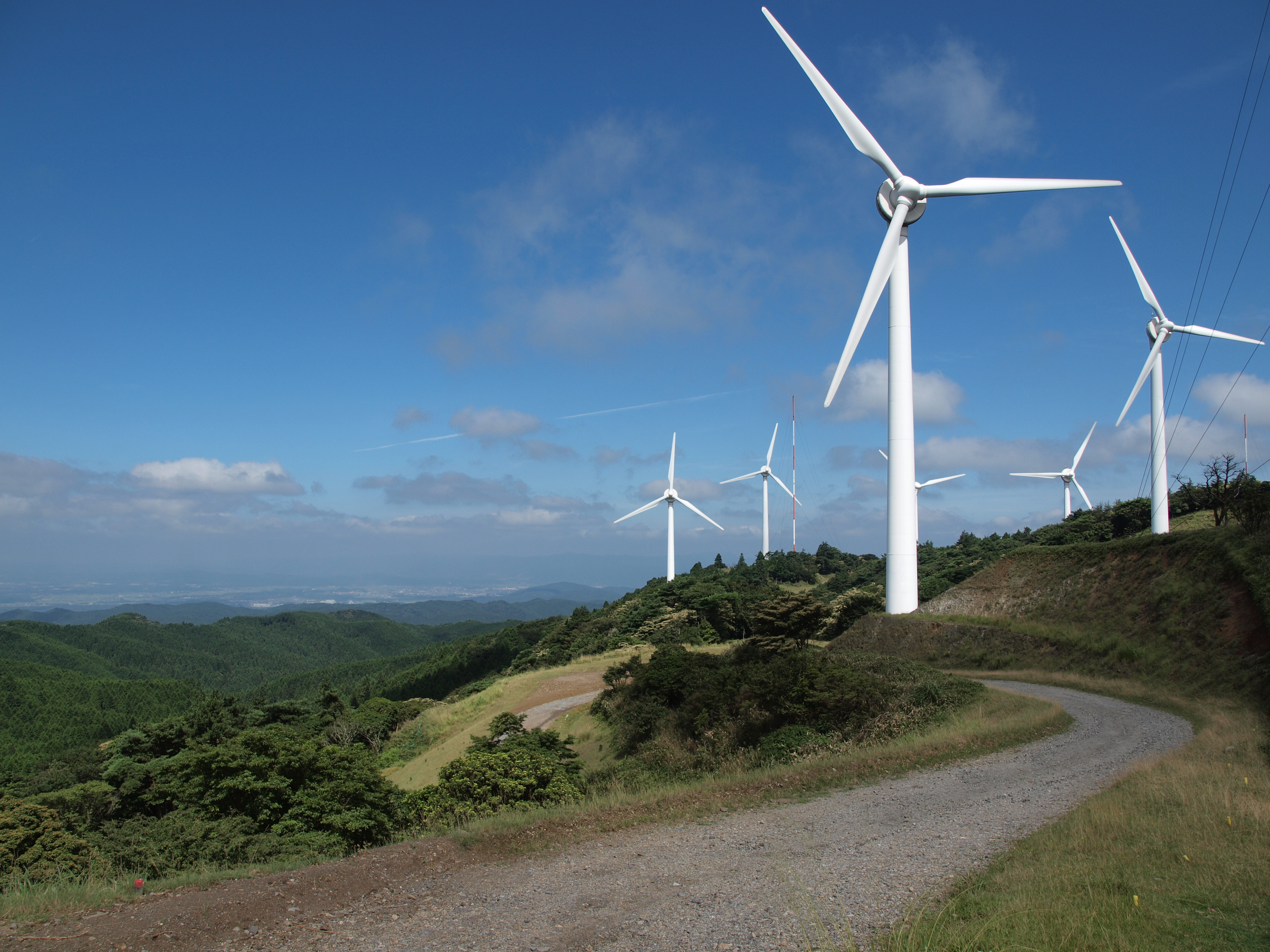
Aoyama Plateau Wind Farm

The Aoyama Plateau Wind Farm (青山高原ウインドファーム, Aoyama kōgen uindofāmu) is the largest wind farm in Japan. It has a total capacity of 95 MW, and is located in the Aoyama Plateau, Muroo-Akame-Aoyama Quasi-National Park.

The wind farm was built in stages. The first phase consisted of 20 750 kW turbines manufactured by JFE Engineering, commissioned in 2003. These turbines have a rotor diameter of 50.5 m and a tower height of 50 m. This original site covers 10.5 hectares and produced a maximum of 15 MW. The second phase was commissioned between 2016 and 2017 and comprises an additional 40 larger 2 MW turbines with a rotor diameter of 65.4 m and a tower height of 80 m, manufactured by Hitachi.

== See also ==
- Wind power in Japan
