= Electric power distribution =

Final stage of electricity delivery to individual consumers in a power grid

Overhead power lines

Electric power distribution is the final stage in the delivery of electricity. Electricity is carried from the transmission system to individual consumers. Distribution substations connect to the transmission system and lower the transmission voltage to medium voltage ranging between 600 V and 35 kV with the use of transformers. Primary distribution lines carry this medium voltage power to distribution transformers located near the customer's premises. Distribution transformers again lower the voltage to the utilization voltage used by lighting, industrial equipment and household appliances. Often several customers are supplied from one transformer through secondary distribution lines. Commercial and residential customers are connected to the secondary distribution lines through service drops. Customers demanding a much larger amount of power may be connected directly to the primary distribution level or the subtransmission level.

General layout of electricity networks. The voltages and loadings are typical of a European network (in Canada, for example, Extra High Voltage can mean 735kV.)

The transition from transmission to distribution happens in a power substation, which has the following functions:

- Circuit breakers and switches enable the substation to be disconnected from the transmission grid or for distribution lines to be disconnected.
- Transformers step down transmission voltages, 35 kV or more, down to primary distribution voltages. These are medium-voltage circuits, usually 600 V-35 kV.
- From the transformer, power goes to the busbar that can split the distribution power off in multiple directions. The bus distributes power to primary distribution lines, which fan out to customers.

Urban distribution is mainly underground, sometimes in common utility ducts. Rural distribution is mostly above ground with utility poles, and suburban distribution is a mix. Closer to the customer, a distribution transformer steps the primary distribution power down to a low-voltage secondary circuit, usually 120/240 V in the United States for residential customers. The power comes to the customer via a service drop and an electricity meter. The final circuit in an urban system may be less than 15 metres (50 ft) but may be over 91 metres (300 ft) for a rural customer.

== History ==
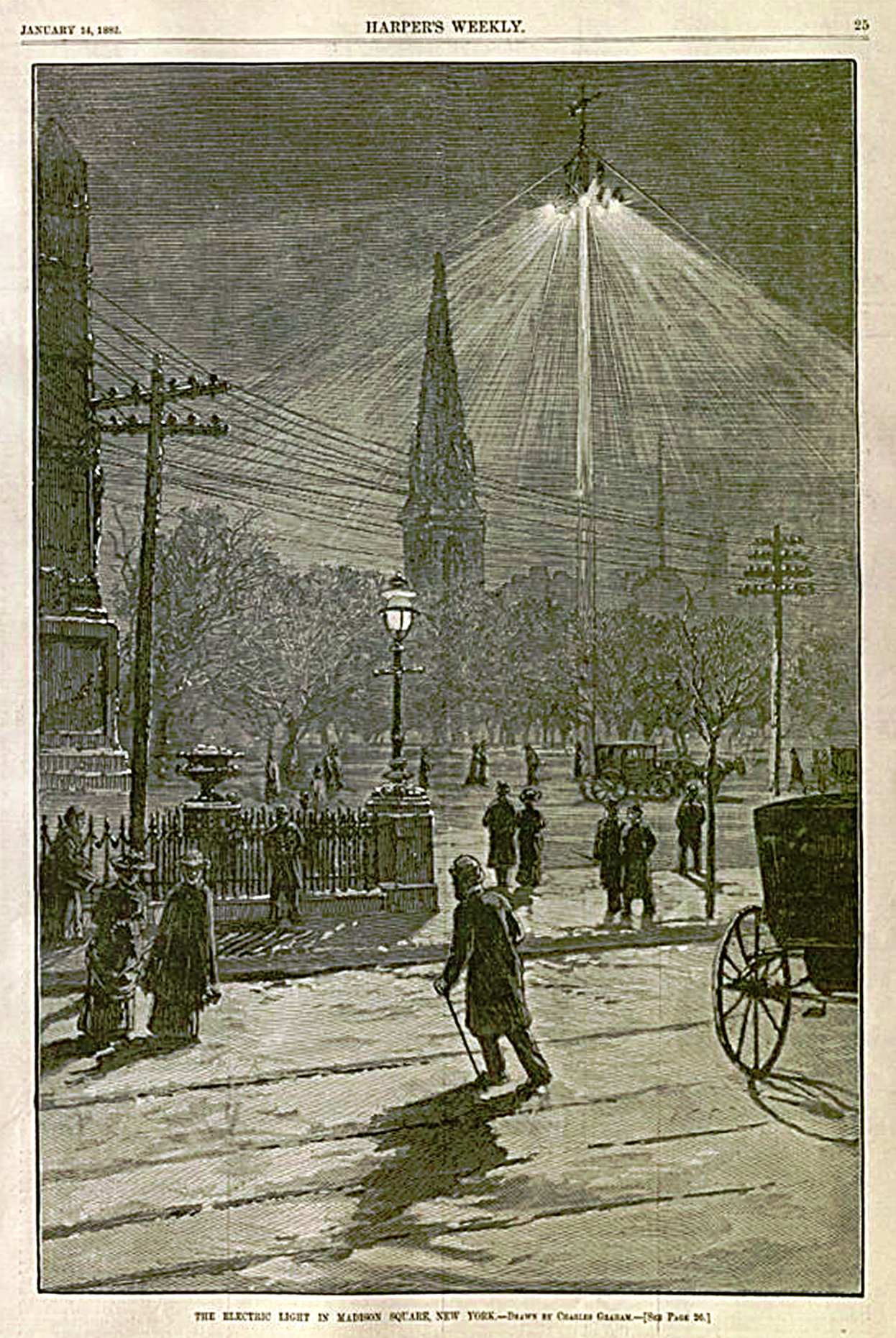
The late 1870s and early 1880s saw the introduction of arc-lamp lighting used outdoors or in large indoor spaces, such as this Brush Electric Company system installed in 1880 in New York City.

Electric power distribution become necessary only in the 1880s, when electricity started being generated at power stations. Until then, electricity was usually generated where it was used. The first power-distribution systems installed in European and US cities were used to supply lighting: arc lighting running on very-high-voltage (around 3,000 V) alternating current (AC) or direct current (DC), and incandescent lighting running on low-voltage (100 V) direct current. Both were supplanting gas lighting systems, with arc lighting taking over large-area and street lighting, and incandescent lighting replacing gas lights for business and residential users.

The high voltages used in arc lighting allowed a single generating station to supply a string of lights up to 7 miles (11 km) long. Each doubling of voltage would allow a given cable to transmit the same amount of power four times the distance than at the lower voltage (with the same power loss). By contrast, direct-current indoor incandescent lighting systems, such as Edison's first power station, installed in 1882, had difficulty supplying customers more than a mile away because they used a low voltage (110 V) from generation to end use. The low voltage translated to higher current and required thick copper cables for transmission. In practice, Edison's DC generating plants needed to be within about 1.5 miles (2.4 km) of the farthest customer to avoid even thicker and more expensive conductors.

=== Introduction of the transformer ===
The problem of transmitting electricity over longer distances became a recognized engineering roadblock to electric power distribution, with many less-than-satisfactory solutions tested by lighting companies. But the mid-1880s saw a breakthrough with the development of functional transformers that allowed AC power to be "stepped up" to a much higher voltage for transmission, then dropped down to a lower voltage near the end user. Compared to direct current, AC had much lower transmission costs and greater economies of scale—with large AC generating plants capable of supplying entire cities and regions leading to the rapid introduction of AC.

In the US the competition between direct current and alternating current took a personal turn in the late 1880s in the form of a "war of currents" when Thomas Edison started attacking George Westinghouse and his development of the first US AC transformer systems, highlighting the deaths caused by high-voltage AC systems over the years and claiming any AC system was inherently dangerous. Edison's propaganda campaign was short-lived, with his company switching over to AC in 1892.

AC became the dominant form of transmission of power with innovations in Europe and the US in electric motor designs, and the development of engineered universal systems allowing the large number of legacy systems to be connected to large AC grids.

In the first half of the 20th century, in many places the electric power industry was vertically integrated, meaning that one company did generation, transmission, distribution, metering and billing. Starting in the 1970s and 1980s, nations began the process of deregulation and privatization, leading to electricity markets. The distribution system would remain regulated due to being a natural monopoly, but generation, retail, and sometimes transmission systems were transformed into competitive markets.

== Generation and transmission ==
Simplified diagram of AC electricity delivery from generation stations to consumers' service drop.

Electric power begins at a generating station, where the potential difference can be as high as 33,000 volts. AC is usually used. Users of large amounts of DC power such as some railway electrification systems, telephone exchanges and industrial processes such as aluminium smelting use rectifiers to derive DC from the public AC supply, or may have their own generation systems. High-voltage DC can be advantageous for isolating alternating-current systems or controlling the quantity of electricity transmitted. For example, Hydro-Québec has a direct-current line which goes from the James Bay region to Boston.

From the generating station it goes to the generating station's switchyard where a step-up transformer (Electrical transformers) increases the voltage to a level suitable for transmission, from 44 kV to 765 kV. Once in the transmission system, electricity from each generating station is combined with electricity produced elsewhere. For alternating-current generators, all generating units connected to a common network must be synchronized, operating at the same frequency within a small tolerance. Alternatively, disparate sources can be combined to serve a common load if some external power converter, such as a rotating machine or a direct current converter system is interposed. Electricity is consumed as soon as it is produced. It is transmitted at a very high speed, close to the speed of light.

== Primary distribution ==
Primary distribution voltages range from 4 kV to 35 kV phase-to-phase (2.4 kV to 20 kV phase-to-neutral) Only large consumers are fed directly from distribution voltages; most utility customers are connected to a transformer, which reduces the distribution voltage to the low voltage "utilization voltage", "supply voltage" or "mains voltage" used by lighting and interior wiring systems.

=== Network configurations ===
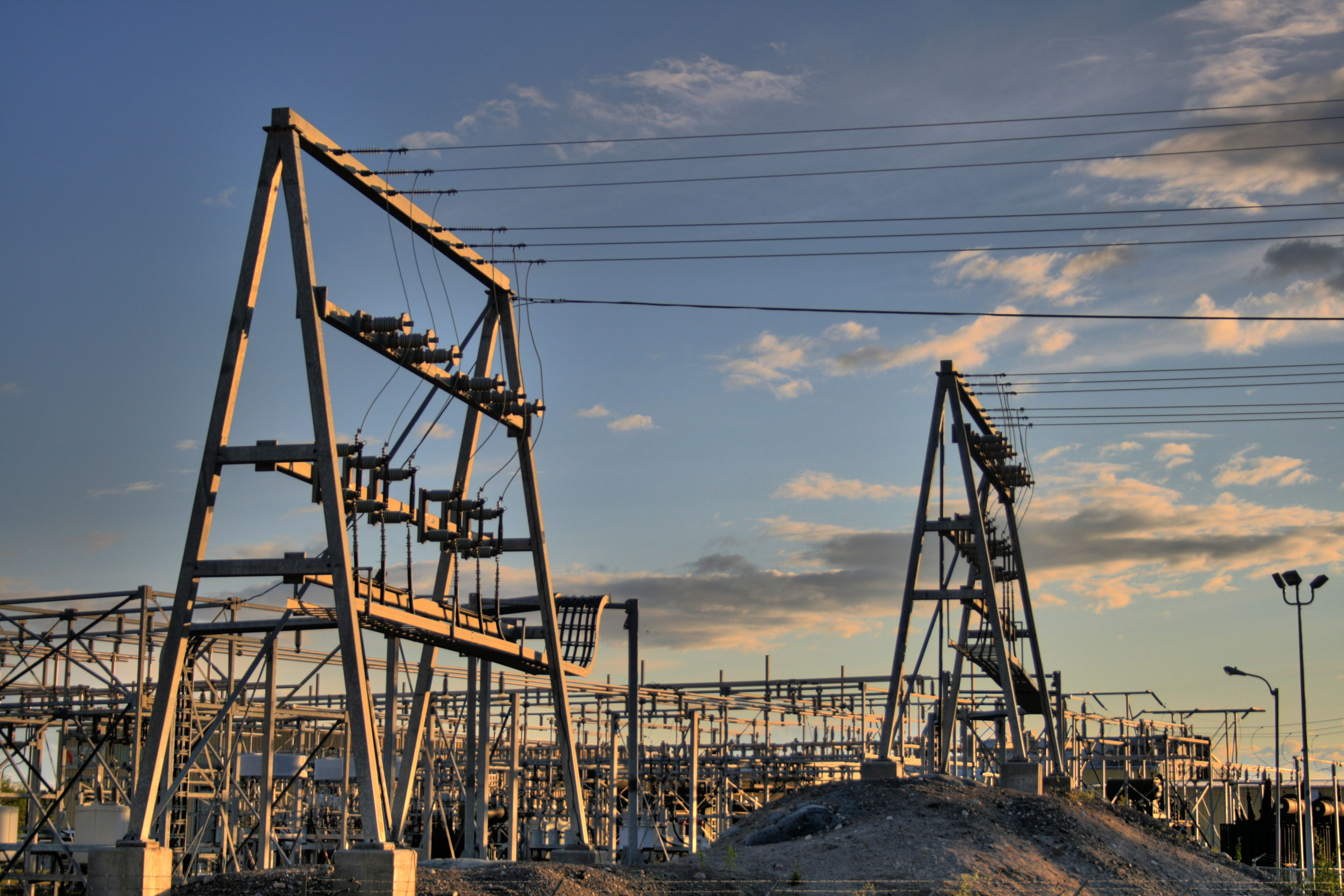
Substation near Yellowknife, in the Northwest Territories, Canada

Distribution networks are divided into two types, radial system or network. A radial system is arranged like a tree where each customer has one source of supply. A network system has multiple sources of supply operating in parallel. Spot networks are used for concentrated loads. Radial systems are commonly used in rural or suburban areas.

Radial systems usually include emergency connections where the system can be reconfigured in case of problems, such as a fault or planned maintenance. This can be done by opening and closing switches to isolate a certain section from the grid. Some utilities have smart switches (also known as trip savers) that automatically reconfigure the network to route around and make safe a grid segment that is experiencing a fault such as a fallen tree or pole.

Long feeders experience voltage drop (power factor distortion) requiring capacitors or voltage regulators to be installed.

Reconfiguration, by exchanging the functional links between the elements of the system, represents one of the most important measures which can improve the operational performance of a distribution system. The problem of optimization through the reconfiguration of a power distribution system, in terms of its definition, is a historical single objective problem with constraints. Since 1975, when Merlin and Back introduced the idea of distribution system reconfiguration for active power loss reduction, a lot of researchers have proposed diverse methods and algorithms to solve the reconfiguration problem as a single objective problem. Some authors have proposed Pareto optimality based approaches (including active power losses and reliability indices as objectives). For this purpose, different artificial intelligence based methods have been used: microgenetic, branch exchange, particle swarm optimization and non-dominated sorting genetic algorithm.

=== Rural services ===
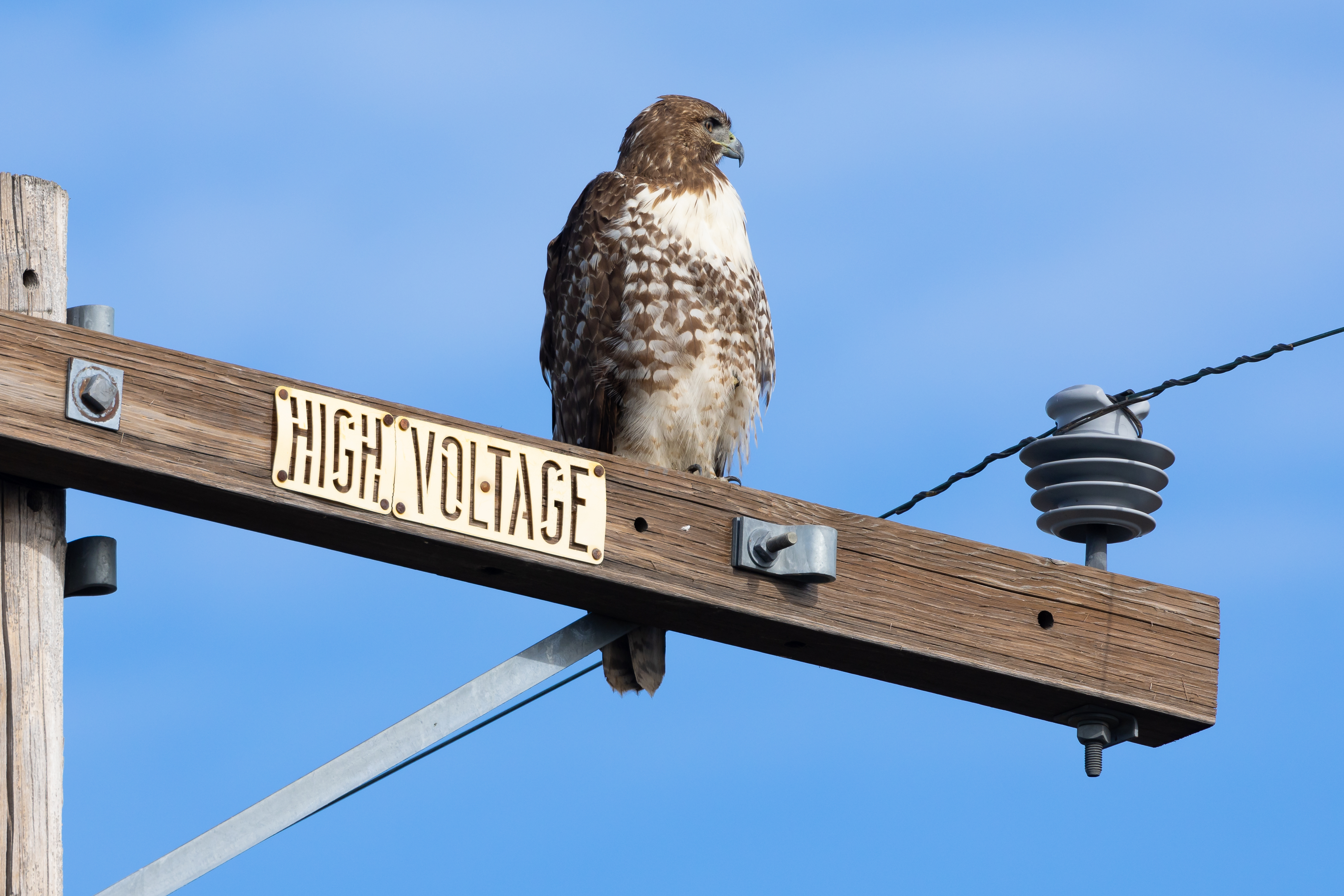
High voltage power pole in rural Butte County, California

Rural electrification systems tend to use higher distribution voltages because of the longer distances covered by distribution lines (see Rural Electrification Administration). 7.2, 12.47, 25, and 34.5 kV distribution is common in the United States; 11 kV and 33 kV are common in the UK, Australia and New Zealand; 11 kV and 22 kV are common in South Africa; 10, 20 and 35 kV are common in China. Other voltages are occasionally used.

Rural services normally try to minimize the number of poles and wires. It uses higher voltages (than urban distribution), which in turn permits use of galvanized steel wire. The strong steel wire allows for less expensive wide pole spacing. In rural areas a pole-mount transformer may serve only one customer. In New Zealand, Australia, Saskatchewan, Canada, and South Africa, Single-wire earth return systems (SWER) are used to electrify remote rural areas.

Three phase service provides power for large agricultural facilities, petroleum pumping facilities, water plants, or other customers that have large loads (three-phase equipment). In North America, overhead distribution systems may be three phase, four wire, with a neutral conductor. Rural distribution system may have long runs of one phase conductor and a neutral. In other countries or in extreme rural areas the neutral wire is connected to the ground to use that as a return (single-wire earth return).

== Secondary distribution ==
World map of mains voltage and frequencies

Electricity is delivered at a frequency of either 50 or 60 Hz, depending on the region. It is delivered to domestic customers as single-phase electric power. In some countries as in Europe a three phase supply may be made available for larger properties. Seen with an oscilloscope, the domestic power supply in North America would look like a sine wave, oscillating between −170 volts and 170 volts, giving an effective voltage of 120 volts RMS. Three-phase electric power is more efficient in terms of power delivered per cable used, and is more suited to running large electric motors. Some large European appliances may be powered by three-phase power, such as electric stoves and clothes dryers.

A ground connection is normally provided for the customer's system as well as for the equipment owned by the utility. The purpose of connecting the customer's system to ground is to limit the voltage that may develop if high voltage conductors fall down onto lower-voltage conductors which are usually mounted lower to the ground, or if a failure occurs within a distribution transformer. Earthing systems can be TT, TN-S, TN-C-S or TN-C.

=== Regional variations ===
==== 220–240 volt systems ====
Most of the world uses 50 Hz 220 or 230 V single phase, or 380 or 400 V three-phase for residential and light industrial services. In this system, the primary distribution network supplies a few substations per area, and the 230/400 V power from each substation is directly distributed to end users over a region of normally less than 1 km radius. Three live (hot) wires and the neutral are connected to the building for a three phase service. Single-phase distribution, with one live wire and the neutral is used domestically where total loads are light. In Europe, electricity is normally distributed for industry and domestic use by the three-phase, four wire system. This gives a phase-to-phase voltage of 400 volts wye service and a single-phase voltage of 230 volts between any one phase and neutral. In the UK a typical urban or suburban low-voltage substation would normally be rated between 150 kVA and 1 MVA and supply a whole neighbourhood of a few hundred houses. Transformers are typically sized on an average load of 1 to 2 kW per household, and the service fuses and cable is sized to allow any one property to draw a peak load of perhaps ten times this.

For industrial customers, 3-phase 400 / 690 volt is also available, or may be generated locally. Large commercial and industrial customers have their own distribution transformers with an input from 11 kV to 33 kV. Some high consumption users are supplied by transmission network from 110 kV to 220 kV.

==== 100–120 volt systems ====
Most of the Americas use 60 Hz AC, the 120/240 volt split-phase system domestically and three phase for larger installations. North American transformers usually power homes at 240 volts, similar to Europe's 230 volts. It is the split-phase that allows use of 120 volts in the home.

Japan's utility frequencies are 50 Hz and 60 Hz.

In the electricity sector in Japan, the standard voltage is 100 V, with both 50 and 60 Hz AC frequencies being used. Parts of the country use 50 Hz, while other parts use 60 Hz. This is a relic from the 1890s. Some local providers in Tokyo imported 50 Hz German equipment, while the local power providers in Osaka brought in 60 Hz generators from the United States. The grids grew until eventually the entire country was wired. Today the frequency is 50 Hz in Eastern Japan (including Tokyo, Yokohama, Tohoku, and Hokkaido) and 60 Hz in Western Japan (including Nagoya, Osaka, Kyoto, Hiroshima, Shikoku, and Kyushu).

Most household appliances are made to work on either frequency. The problem of incompatibility came into the public eye when the 2011 Tōhoku earthquake and tsunami knocked out about a third of the east's capacity, and power in the west could not be fully shared with the east since the country does not have a common frequency.

There are four high-voltage direct current (HVDC) converter stations that move power across Japan's AC frequency border. Shin Shinano is a back-to-back HVDC facility in Japan which forms one of four frequency changer stations that link Japan's western and eastern power grids. The other three are at Higashi-Shimizu, Minami-Fukumitsu and Sakuma Dam. Together they can move up to 1.2 GW of power east or west.

==== 240 volt systems and 120 volt outlets ====
Most modern North American homes are wired to receive 240 volts from the transformer, and through the use of split-phase electrical power, can have both 120 volt receptacles and 240 volt receptacles. The 120 volts is typically used for lighting and most wall outlets. The 240 volt circuits are typically used for appliances requiring high watt heat output such as ovens and heaters. They may also be used to supply an electric car charger.

== Modern distribution systems ==
Traditionally, the distribution systems would only operate as simple distribution lines where the electricity from the transmission networks would be shared among the customers. Today's distribution systems are heavily integrated with renewable energy generations at the distribution level of the power systems by the means of distributed generation resources, such as solar power and wind power. As a result, distribution systems are gradually becoming more independent from the transmission networks. Balancing the supply-demand relationship at these modern distribution networks (sometimes referred to as microgrids) is challenging, and it requires the use of various economic, technological and operational means to operate. Such tools include market signals, battery storage power station, data analytics, optimization tools, etc.

Increased ambient temperatures during extreme heat events can reduce the efficiency of electrical transmission and distribution systems. The power rating of transformers, underground cables and overhead lines are limited under high ambient temperatures.

== See also ==
- Backfeeding
- Cost of electricity by source
- Distribution network operator
- Dynamic voltage restoration
- Electric utility
- Electricity distribution companies by country
- Electricity generation
- Electricity retailing
- Extra-low voltage
- High voltage
- Low voltage
- Network protector
- Overhead power line
- Power distribution unit
- Power-system automation – IEEE standard to interconnect tele-protection and multiplexer devices of power utility companies
- Power system simulation
- Transmission system operator
- High-voltage transformer fire barriers
- Ultra-high-voltage electricity transmission in China
