= Mains electricity =

Type of lower-voltage electricity most commonly provided by utilities

World map showing the percentage of the population in each country with access to mains electricity (as of 2017), a measure of the extent of electrification: 80–100% 60–80% 40–60% 20–40% 0–20%

Mains electricity, utility power, grid power, domestic power, wall power, line voltage, household current, or, in some parts of Canada, hydro, is a general-purpose alternating current (AC) electric power supply. It is the form of electrical power that is delivered to homes and businesses through the electrical grid in many parts of the world. People use this electricity to power everyday items (such as domestic appliances, televisions and lamps) by plugging them into a wall outlet.

The voltage and frequency of electric power differs between regions. In much of the world, a voltage (nominally) of 230 volts and frequency of 50 Hz is used. In North America, the most common combination is 120 V and a frequency of 60 Hz although other National Electrical Code combinations exist (e.g., 240 V or 208 V at 60 Hz). Travellers' portable appliances may be inoperative or damaged by foreign electrical supplies. Non-interchangeable plugs and sockets in different regions provide some protection from accidental use of appliances with incompatible voltage and frequency requirements.

== Terminology ==
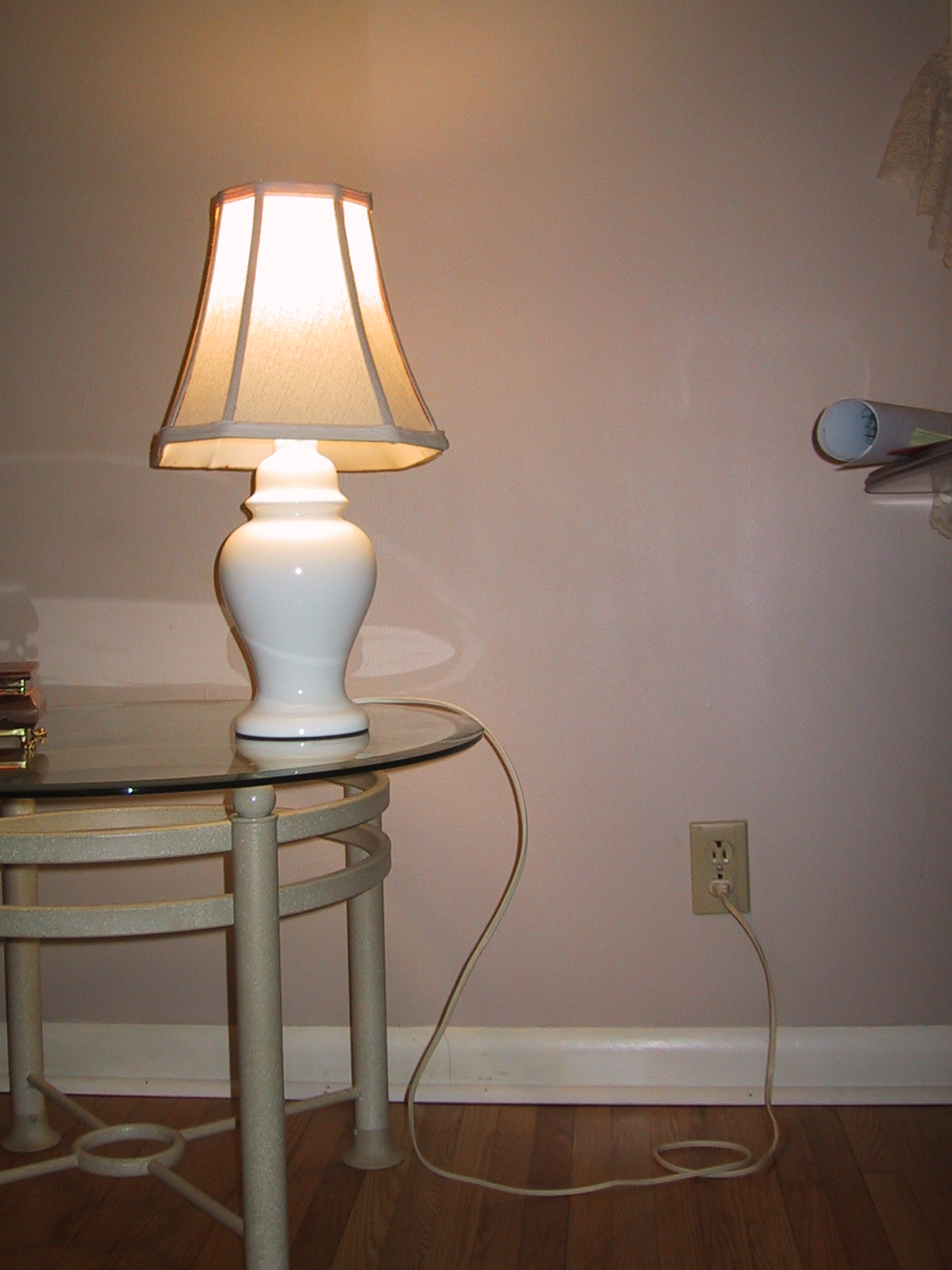
A table lamp connected to a wall socket (the mains)

In the US, the electricity that a building receives is called an electrical service, and what comes out of a receptacle is referred to by its voltage, such as 120 or 240. Sometimes it might be referred to by its number of phases, such as Three Phase.

In the UK, mains electric power is generally referred to as "the mains".

More than half of power in Canada is hydroelectricity, and mains electricity is often referred to as "hydro" in some regions of the country. This is also reflected in names of current and historical electricity utilities such as Hydro-Québec, BC Hydro, Manitoba Hydro, Hydro One (Ontario), and Newfoundland and Labrador Hydro.

== Power systems ==
Worldwide, many different mains power systems are found for the operation of household and light commercial electrical appliances and lighting. The different systems are primarily characterized by:

- Voltage
- Frequency
- Plugs and sockets (receptacles or outlets)
- Earthing system (grounding)
- Protection against overcurrent damage (e.g., due to short circuit), electric shock, and fire hazards
- Parameter tolerances.

All of these parameters vary among regions. The voltages are generally in the range 100–240 V (always expressed as root-mean-square voltage). The two commonly used frequencies are 50 Hz and 60 Hz. Single-phase or three-phase power is most commonly used today, although two-phase systems were used early in the 20th century. Foreign enclaves, such as large industrial plants or overseas military bases, may have a different standard voltage or frequency from the surrounding areas. Some city areas may use standards different from that of the surrounding countryside (e.g. in Libya). Regions in an effective state of anarchy may have no central electrical authority, with electric power provided by incompatible private sources.

Many other combinations of voltage and utility frequency were formerly used, with frequencies between 25 Hz and 133 Hz and voltages from 100 V to 250 V. Direct current (DC) has been displaced by alternating current (AC) in public power systems, but DC was used especially in some city areas to the end of the 20th century. The modern combinations of 230 V/50 Hz and 120 V/60 Hz, listed in IEC 60038, did not apply in the first few decades of the 20th century and are still not universal. Industrial plants with three-phase power will have different, higher voltages installed for large equipment (and different sockets and plugs), but the common voltages listed here would still be found for lighting and portable equipment.

== Common uses of electricity ==
Electricity is used for lighting, heating, cooling, electric motors and electronic equipment. The US Energy Information Administration (EIA) has published:

U.S. residential sector electricity consumption by major end uses in 2021

End use	Petajoules (Terawatt-hours)	Share of total
Space cooling	850 (235)	15%
Space heating	750 (207)	14%
Water heating	630 (176)	12%
Refrigeration	310 (87)	6%
Clothes dryers	230 (64)	4%
Lighting	210 (59)	4%
Televisions and related equipment^{1}	200 (56)	4%
Computers and related equipment^{2}	130 (36)	2%
Furnace fans and boiler circulation pumps	86 (24)	2%
Freezers	72 (20)	1%
Cooking	58 (16)	1%
Clothes washers^{3}	40 (11)	1%
Dishwashers^{3}	29 (8)	1%
Other uses^{4}	1,900 (520)	34%
Total consumption	5,470 (1,519)	100%

^{1} Includes televisions, set-top boxes, home theatre systems, DVD players, and video game consoles.
^{2} Includes desktop and laptop computers, monitors, and networking equipment.
^{3} Does not include water heating.
^{4} Includes small electric devices, heating elements, exterior lights, outdoor grills, pool and spa heaters, backup electricity generators, and motors not listed above. Does not include electric vehicle charging.

Electronic appliances such as computers or televisions sets typically use an AC to DC converter or AC adapter to power the device. This is often capable of operation with a wide range of voltage and with both common power frequencies. Other AC applications usually have much more restricted input ranges.

== Building wiring ==
Standard	Earth/Ground wire	Neutral wire	Live/Phase 1 wire	Live/Phase 2 wire (Optional)	Live/Phase 3 wire (Optional)
Europe / Most of World (IEC)	green/yellow	blue	brown	black	gray
UK (Old) / India / South Africa	green/yellow	black	red	yellow	blue
United States / Canada (NEC)	green	white	black	red	blue
Australia	green/yellow	black	red	white	blue

Portable appliances use single-phase electric power, with two or three wired contacts at each outlet. Two wires (neutral and live/active/hot) carry current to operate the device. A third wire, not always present, connects conductive parts of the appliance case to earth ground. This protects users from electric shock if live internal parts accidentally contact the case.

In northern and central Europe, residential electrical supply is commonly 400 V three-phase electric power, which gives 230 V between any single phase and neutral; house wiring may be a mix of three-phase and single-phase circuits, but three-phase residential use is rare in the UK. High-power appliances such as kitchen stoves, water heaters and household power heavy tools like log splitters may be supplied from the 400 V three-phase power supply.

Small portable electrical equipment is connected to the power supply through flexible cables terminated in a plug, which is inserted into a fixed receptacle (socket). Larger household electrical equipment and industrial equipment may be permanently wired to the fixed wiring of the building. For example, in North American homes a window-mounted self-contained air conditioner unit would be connected to a wall plug, whereas the central air conditioning for a whole home would be permanently wired. Larger plug and socket combinations are used for industrial equipment carrying larger currents, higher voltages, or three phase electric power.

=== Safety systems ===
Circuit breakers and fuses are used to detect short circuits between the line and neutral or ground wires or the drawing of more current than the wires are rated to handle (overload protection) to prevent overheating and possible fire. These protective devices are usually mounted in a central panel—most commonly a distribution board or consumer unit—in a building, but some wiring systems also provide a protection device at the socket or within the plug. Residual-current devices, also known as ground-fault circuit interrupters and appliance leakage current interrupters, are used to detect ground faults—flow of current in other than the neutral and line wires (like the ground wire or a person). When a ground fault is detected, the device quickly cuts off the circuit.

The terms "ground wires" and "earth wires" are used interchangeably, depending on regional differences, for a wire that connects to the earth or some conducting body that serves in place of the earth to take the electrical discharge. Grounding wires are installed as a safety feature in order to route electricity into another safe body that is not electrically conductive like the air or ground in order to prevent short circuits or electrocution.

== Voltage levels ==
World map of mains voltages and frequencies, simplified to country level

Most of the world population (Europe, Africa, Asia, Australia, New Zealand, and much of South America) use a supply that is within 6% of 230 V. In the United Kingdom the nominal supply voltage is 230 V +10%/−6% to accommodate the fact that most transformers are in fact still set to 240 V. The 230 V standard has become widespread so that 230 V equipment can be used in most parts of the world with the aid of an adapter or a change to the equipment's plug to the standard for the specific country.

The United States and Canada use a supply voltage of 120 volts ± 6%. Japan, Taiwan, Saudi Arabia, North America, Central America and some parts of northern South America use a voltage between 100 V and 127 V. However, most of the households in Japan equip split-phase electric power like the United States, which can supply 200 V by using reversed phase at the same time. Brazil is unusual in having both 127 V and 220 V systems at 60 Hz and also permitting interchangeable plugs and sockets.

Saudi Arabia and Mexico have mixed voltage systems; in residential and light commercial buildings both countries use 127 volts, with 220 volts at 60 Hz in commercial and industrial applications. The Saudi government approved plans in August 2010 to transition the country to a totally 230/400-volt 60 Hz system.

=== Measuring voltage ===
A distinction should be made between the voltage at the point of supply (nominal voltage at the point of interconnection between the electrical utility and the user) and the voltage rating of the equipment (utilization or load voltage). Typically the utilization voltage is 3% to 5% lower than the nominal system voltage; for example, a nominal 208 V supply system will be connected to motors with "200 V" on their nameplates. This allows for the voltage drop between equipment and supply. Voltages in this article are the nominal supply voltages and equipment used on these systems will carry slightly lower nameplate voltages. Power distribution system voltage is nearly sinusoidal in nature.

Voltages are expressed as root mean square (RMS) voltage and not peak-to-peak. Voltage tolerances are for steady-state operation. Momentary heavy loads, or switching operations in the power distribution network, may cause short-term deviations out of the tolerance band and storms and other unusual conditions may cause even larger transient variations. In general, power supplies derived from large networks with many sources are more stable than those supplied to an isolated community with perhaps only a single generator.

=== Choice of voltage ===
The choice of supply voltage is due more to historical reasons than optimization of the electric power distribution system—once a voltage is in use and equipment using this voltage is widespread, changing voltage is a drastic and expensive measure. A 230 V distribution system will use less conductor material than a 120 V system to deliver a given amount of power because the current, and consequently the resistive loss, is lower. While large heating appliances can use smaller conductors at 230 V for the same output rating, few household appliances use anything like the full capacity of the outlet to which they are connected. Minimum wire size for hand-held or portable equipment is usually restricted by the mechanical strength of the conductors.

Many areas, such as the US, which use (nominally) 120 V, make use of three-wire, split-phase 240 V systems to supply large appliances. In this system a 240 V supply has a centre-tapped neutral to give two 120 V supplies which can also supply 240 V to loads connected between the two line wires. Three-phase systems can be connected to give various combinations of voltage, suitable for use by different classes of equipment. Where both single-phase and three-phase loads are served by an electrical system, the system may be labelled with both voltages such as 120/208 or 230/400 V, to show the line-to-neutral voltage and the line-to-line voltage. Large loads are connected for the higher voltage. Other three-phase voltages, up to 830 volts, are occasionally used for special-purpose systems such as oil well pumps. Large industrial motors (say, more than 250 hp or 150 kW) may operate on medium voltage. On 60 Hz systems a standard for medium voltage equipment is 2,400/4,160 V whereas 3,300 V is the common standard for 50 Hz systems.

=== Standardization ===
Until 1987, mains voltage in large parts of Europe, including Germany, Austria and Switzerland, was 220±22 V while the UK used 240±14.4 V. Standard ISO IEC 60038:1983 defined the new standard European voltage to be 230±23 V. From 1987 onwards, a step-wise shift towards 230+13.8
−23 V was implemented. From 2009 on, the voltage is permitted to be 230±23 V. No change in voltage was required by either the Central European or the UK system, as both 220 V and 240 V fall within the lower 230 V tolerance bands (230 V ±6%). Usually the voltage of 230 V ±3% is maintained. Some areas of the UK still have 250 volts for legacy reasons, but these also fall within the 10% tolerance band of 230 volts. In practice, this allowed countries to have supplied the same voltage (220 or 240 V), at least until existing supply transformers are replaced. Equipment (with the exception of filament bulbs) used in these countries is designed to accept any voltage within the specified range.

In 2000, Australia converted to 230 V as the nominal standard with a tolerance of +10%/−6%, this superseding the old 240 V standard, AS 2926-1987. The tolerance was increased in 2022 to ± 10% with the release of AS IEC 60038:2022. The utilization voltage available at an appliance may be below this range, due to voltage drops within the customer installation. As in the UK, 240 V is within the allowable limits and "240 volt" is a synonym for mains in Australian and British English.

In the United States and Canada, national standards specify that the nominal voltage at the source should be 120 V and allow a range of 114 V to 126 V (RMS) (−5% to +5%). Historically, 110 V, 115 V and 117 V have been used at different times and places in North America. Mains power is sometimes spoken of as 110 V; however, 120 V is the nominal voltage.

In Japan, the electrical power supply to households is at 100 and 200 V. Eastern and northern parts of Honshū (including Tokyo) and Hokkaidō have a frequency of 50 Hz, whereas western Honshū (including Nagoya, Osaka, and Hiroshima), Shikoku, Kyūshū and Okinawa operate at 60 Hz. The boundary between the two regions contains four back-to-back high-voltage direct-current (HVDC) substations which interconnect the power between the two grid systems; these are Shin Shinano, Sakuma Dam, Minami-Fukumitsu, and the Higashi-Shimizu Frequency Converter. To accommodate the difference, frequency-sensitive appliances marketed in Japan can often be switched between the two frequencies.

== History ==
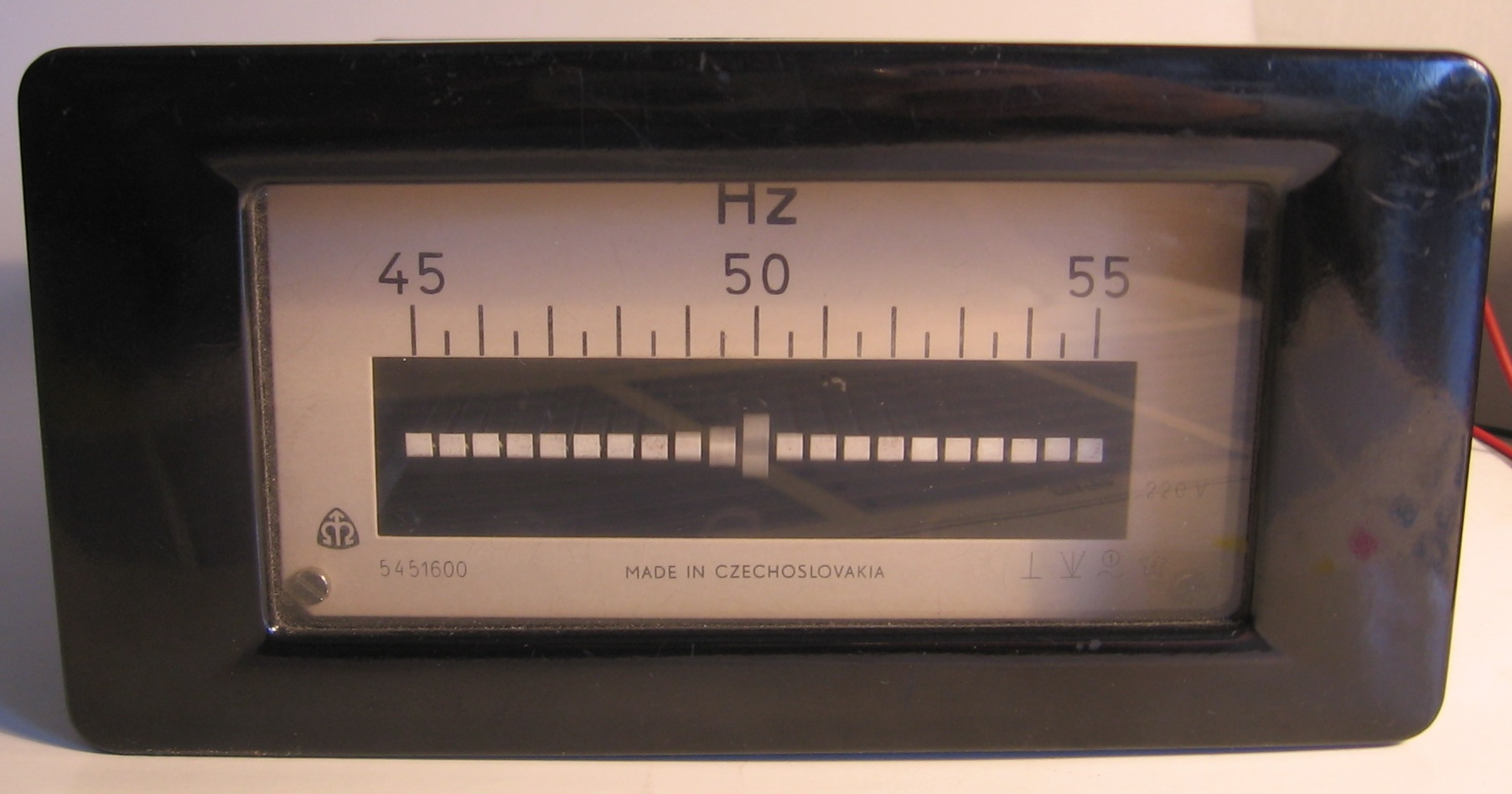
A 50 Hz ±5 Hz vibrating-reed mains frequency meter for 220 V

The world's first public electricity supply was a water wheel driven system constructed in the small English town of Godalming in 1881. It was an alternating current (AC) system using a Siemens alternator supplying power for both street lights and consumers at two voltages, 250 V for arc lamps, and 40 V for incandescent lamps.

The world's first large scale central plant—Thomas Edison's steam powered station at Holborn Viaduct in London—started operation in January 1882, providing direct current (DC) at 110 V. The Holborn Viaduct station was used as a proof of concept for the construction of the much larger Pearl Street Station in New York, the world's first permanent commercial central power plant. The Pearl Street Station also provided DC at 110 V, considered to be a "safe" voltage for consumers, beginning 4 September 1882.

AC systems started appearing in the US in the mid-1880s, using higher distribution voltage stepped down via transformers to the same 110 V customer utilization voltage that Edison used. In 1883, Edison patented a three–wire distribution system to allow DC generation plants to serve a wider radius of customers to save on copper costs. By connecting two groups of 110 V lamps in series more load could be served by the same size conductors run with 220 V between them; a neutral conductor carried any imbalance of current between the two sub-circuits. AC circuits adopted the same form during the war of the currents, allowing lamps to be run at around 110 V and major appliances to be connected to 220 V. Nominal voltages gradually crept upward to 112 V and 115 V, or even 117 V.

After World War II the standard voltage in the U.S. became 117 V, but many areas lagged behind even into the 1960s. In 1954, the American National Standards Institute (ANSI) published C84.1 "American National Standard for Electric Power Systems and Equipment – Voltage Ratings (60 Hertz)". This standard established 120 volt nominal system and two ranges for service voltage and utilization voltage variations. Today, virtually all American homes and businesses have access to 120 and 240 V at 60 Hz. Both voltages are available on the three wires (two "hot" legs of opposite phase and one "neutral" leg).

In 1899, the Berliner Elektrizitäts-Werke (BEW), a Berlin electrical utility, decided to greatly increase its distribution capacity by switching to 220 V nominal distribution, taking advantage of the higher voltage capability of newly developed metal filament lamps. The company was able to offset the cost of converting the customer's equipment by the resulting saving in distribution conductors cost. This became the model for electrical distribution in Germany and the rest of Europe and the 220 V system became common. North American practice remained with voltages near 110 V for lamps.

In the first decade after the introduction of alternating current in the US (from the early 1880s to about 1893) a variety of different frequencies were used, with each electric provider setting their own, so that no single one prevailed. The most common frequency was 133 1/3 Hz. The rotation speed of induction generators and motors, the efficiency of transformers, and flickering of carbon arc lamps all played a role in frequency setting.

Around 1893 the Westinghouse Electric Company in the United States and AEG in Germany decided to standardize their generation equipment on 60 Hz and 50 Hz respectively, eventually leading to most of the world being supplied at one of these two frequencies. Today most 60 Hz systems deliver nominal 120/240 V, and most 50 Hz nominally 230 V. The significant exceptions are in Brazil, which has a synchronized 60 Hz grid with both 127 V and 220 V as standard voltages in different regions, and Japan, which has two frequencies: 50 Hz for East Japan and 60 Hz for West Japan.

== Voltage regulation ==
To maintain the voltage at the customer's service within the acceptable range, electrical distribution utilities use regulating equipment at electrical substations or along the distribution line. At a substation, the step-down transformer will have an automatic on-load tap changer, allowing the ratio between transmission voltage and distribution voltage to be adjusted in steps.

For long (several kilometres) rural distribution circuits, automatic voltage regulators may be mounted on poles of the distribution line. These are autotransformers, again, with on-load tap changers to adjust the ratio depending on the observed voltage changes. At each customer's service, the step-down transformer has up to five taps to allow some range of adjustment, usually ±5% of the nominal voltage. Since these taps are not automatically controlled, they are used only to adjust the long-term average voltage at the service and not to regulate the voltage seen by the utility customer.

== Power quality ==
The stability of the voltage and frequency supplied to customers varies among countries and regions. "Power quality" is a term describing the degree of deviation from the nominal supply voltage and frequency. Short-term surges and drop-outs affect sensitive electronic equipment such as computers and flat-panel displays. Longer-term power outages, brownouts and blackouts and low reliability of supply generally increase costs to customers, who may have to invest in uninterruptible power supply or stand-by generator sets to provide power when the utility supply is unavailable or unusable. Erratic power supply may be a severe economic handicap to businesses and public services which rely on electrical machinery, illumination, climate control and computers. Even the best quality power system may have breakdowns or require servicing. As such, companies, governments and other organizations sometimes have backup generators at sensitive facilities, to ensure that power will be available even in the event of a power outage or black out.

Power quality can also be affected by distortions of the current or voltage waveform in the form of harmonics of the fundamental (supply) frequency, or non-harmonic (inter)modulation distortion such as that caused by electromagnetic interference. In contrast, harmonic distortion is usually caused by conditions of the load or generator. In multi-phase power, phase shift distortions caused by imbalanced loads can occur.

== See also ==
- Electricity meter
- Mains electricity by country
- Maximum demand indicator
