= ARC International =

ARC International may refer to:

- ARC (processor), the Argonaut RISC Core, a series of embedded computer processors developed by ARC International PLC
- Synopsys ARC, the developer of the ARC embedded processor series
- Arc International, a privately held French housewares company
