= B2B =

B2B, B to B, or B-to-B may refer to:

== Sports ==
- B2B, a controversial and short lived class in the 1979 Sidecar World Championship
- Bay to Breakers, an annual footrace in San Francisco, California on the third Sunday of May
- Budapest-Bamako, now the largest amateur rally in the world, the largest rally across the Sahara and an important charity car race in Africa
- Box-to-box, central midfielders who are skilled at both defending and attacking

== Other uses ==
- BtoB (band), a South Korean boy group
- Business-to-business, commerce transactions between businesses, such as between a manufacturer and a wholesaler, or between a wholesaler and a retailer
- Bean-to-bar, a marketing term for chocolate production
- "B2B", a 2024 song by Charli XCX from the album Brat

== See also ==
- B2C
- B2G
- Back to Back (disambiguation)
- Back to Basics (disambiguation)
- BOTB (disambiguation)
