= Back to Back =

Back to Back or back-to-back may refer to:

== Film and theatre ==
- Back to Back (film), a 1996 American action film
- Back-to-back film production, the practice of making two films as a unified production
- Back to Back Theatre, an Australian theater company

== Music ==
=== Albums ===
- Back to Back (Brecker Brothers album), 1976
- Back to Back (Heard Ranier Ferguson album), 1987 reissue of the 1983 album Heard Ranier Ferguson
- Back to Back (The Mar-Keys and Booker T. & the M.G.'s album), 1967
- Back to Back (P.I.D. album), 1989
- Back to Back (Status Quo album), 1983
- Back to Back: Duke Ellington and Johnny Hodges Play the Blues, 1959
- Back to Back: Raw & Uncut, by Method Man and Streetlife, 2008
- Back to Back, by the Righteous Brothers, 1965
- Back to Back, by Tiny Moore and Jethro Burns, 1979

=== Songs ===
- "Back to Back" (song), by Drake, 2015
- "Back to Back" (Jeanne Pruett song), 1979
- "Back to Back" (Zerrydl song), 2024
- "Back to Back", by Deep Purple from Rapture of the Deep, 2005
- "Back to Back", by Nardo Wick, 2024
- "Back to Back", by Pretty Maids from Red Hot and Heavy, 1984
- "Back to Back", by the Rubens from 0202, 2021
- "Back to Back", written by Irving Berlin, c. 1937–1941

== Other uses ==
- Back-to-back connection, types of connections in telecommunications and electric power transmission
- Back-to-back home runs, in baseball
- Back-to-back house, a terraced house common in Victorian English inner-city areas
- Back-to-back life sentences, a judicial practice
- Back to back ticketing, a booking ploy used by travelers in commercial aviation
- Back-to-back user agent, the user agent to both ends of a Session Initiation Protocol call
- Layne Flack (1969–2021), nicknamed "Back to Back", American professional poker player

== See also ==
- BB (disambiguation)
