= Fukumitsu =

Fukumitsu may refer to:

- Fukumitsu, Toyama, a town in Nishitonami District, Toyama, Japan
- Minami-Fukumitsu, a power grid station

== People with the surname ==
- Hisayo Fukumitsu (福光 久代, born 1960), Japanese high jumper
- Takaki Fukumitsu (福満 隆貴, born 1992), Japanese footballer
