= BOTB =

BOTB may refer to:

- Battle of the Bands, a music competition involving two or more bands
- Battle of the Bands (disambiguation), various other topics
- "Battle of the Bastards", an episode of the hit series Game of Thrones
- Best of the Best (disambiguation), various topics
- Battle of the Blades, a Canadian television figure skating competition broadcast by CBC
- Besses o' th' Barn, an area within the Metropolitan Borough of Bury in Greater Manchester, England

== See also ==
- BtoB (disambiguation), meaning "business-to-business", "back-to-back", or various other things
