= Electricity delivery =

Electricity delivery is the process that starts after generation of electricity in the power station, up to the use by the consumer. The main processes in electricity delivery are, by order:

- Transmission
- Distribution
- Retailing

== See also ==
- Electrical grid
- Electricity supply
