= P.I.D. =

American Christian hip hop group

- Origin: Carrollton, Texas, United States
- Genre: Christian hip hop
- Years active: 1987–1993, 2024–present
- Labels: Graceland; Frontline; MYX
- Members: Fred Lynch; King Solomon Jay; Ace One the MC
- Past members: Barry G
- Website: preachas.com

P.I.D. (an abbreviation for Preachers in Disguise, also known as Preachas and Preachas in Disguise) is an American Christian hip hop group.

Founded in Dallas, Texas by ministers Fred Lynch and Barry Hogan, they were initially active during the 1980s and early 1990s, releasing five studio albums with moderate success. Although they disbanded in 1993, they reunited in 2024 after being asked to co-produce a documentary on Christian hip hop, releasing new music the same year.

== History ==
Lynch, then a youth pastor, and Hogan a member of the youth group originally met in 1982. Several years later, during 1987, Hogan, Lynch, and several other members found the group in Carrollton, Texas.

Winning a major contest in Chicago during 1988, they received a record contract with Graceland Records. The group released their first album, We Are Here, later that year. After seeing some success, they released their second album, Back to Back, in 1989, which became the first rap album to reach the US Top Inspirational Albums chart.

Barry G left in 1991, as Lynch's brother K-Mack joined the group. They released their third album, The Chosen Ones, via Frontline Records in 1991.

In 1992, the group released their fourth album, Born with the Gift: John 3:16 Factor, where after the departure of Barry Hogan, Jonathan Johnson aka King Solomon Jay joined the group. in 1992 into 1993 PID, Changing their name to Preachas, new member Ace M.C. aka Ace one the MC was added and the group released their fifth album, Violent Playgrounds on MYX Records. Disbanding that same year, founding member Fred Lynch ended up working for Josh McDowell Ministries. Ace MC went on to a solo career and established EndTime Recordings (now Endtime Entertainment, LLC) and founded a Church, LIFE COMMUNITY CHURCH of Arlington. in Arlington Texas.

They remained disbanded until 2023, when they were asked to co-produce the documentary Mic Drop: The Culture of Christian Hip Hop, when the group chose to reunite to produce new music. They signed to Holy Culture Records and released multiple singles later that year including "Take 'Em To Church", "Favor", and "The Crucible". P.I.D. continues to pioneer and do music and ministry nationally and internationally on multiple levels.

== Discography ==
- 1988: We Are Here (Graceland)
- 1989: Back to Back
- 1991: The Chosen Ones
- 1992: Born With the Gift: John 3:16 Factor
- 1993: Violent Playgrounds
- 1999: The Very Best of P.I.D.
