= Battle of the bands (disambiguation) =

A battle of the bands is a contest in which two or more bands compete for the title of "best band".

Battle of the bands may also refer to:

== Film and television ==
- Battle of the Bands (film), a 2007 film from the series The Naked Brothers Band
- "Battle of the Bands" (Amphibia episode)
- "Battle of the Bands", an episode of Even Stevens
- "Battle of the Bands", an episode of Kappa Mikey
- "Battle of the Bands", an episode of The Grim Adventures of Billy & Mandy
- "Battle of the Bands", an episode of the Indian TV series Best of Luck Nikki
- Pepsi Battle of the Bands, a Pakistani music television series

== Events ==
- Honda Battle of the Bands, an annual event in the U.S. featuring marching bands from historically black colleges and universities
- The Battle of the Bands (event), 1845 public musical competition held at the Champ de Mars in Paris, France

== Other ==
- Amphibia: Battle of the Bands, an EP featuring songs from Amphibia
- Battle of the Bands (book), a 2006 book set in the same universe as the High School Musical series
- Battle of the Bands (video game), a 2008 video game for the Wii console

== See also ==
- The Battle of Britpop, the rivalry between rock bands Oasis and Blur
- The Turtles Present the Battle of the Bands
- Battle of Bauds, a 962 battle between Scotland and Norse pirates
