= Bormioli Rocco =

Italian manufacturer of household

Bormioli Rocco SpA
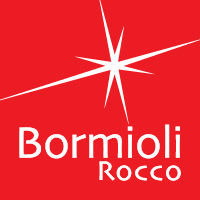
- Type: Private
- Industry: Manufacturer
- Founded: Fidenza, Province of Parma, Italy (1825)
- Founder: Luigi Bormioli
- Headquarters: Fidenza, 43036, Italy
- Area served: Europe; Asia; North America; South America; Oceania
- Key people: Alberto Bormioli Chairman, Giovanni Bellavite stakeholder (17%)
- Products: Household goods
- Revenue: €554 million (2011)
- Subsidiaries: Bormioli Rocco International Holding S.A.
- Website: www.bormiolirocco.com/en/company

Bormioli Rocco (Italian pronunciation: [borˈmjɔːli ˈrɔkko]) (operating as Bormioli Luigi SpA) is an Italian manufacturer of household goods such as tableware, glassware, plastic containers for home use and pharmaceutical use. The company was founded in 1825 in Fidenza (Province of Parma, Italy).

Bormioli Rocco operates nine plants, two decorative ateliers, nine stores and one flagship store, with a presence in over 100 countries and with over 2,500 employees.

== Early history ==
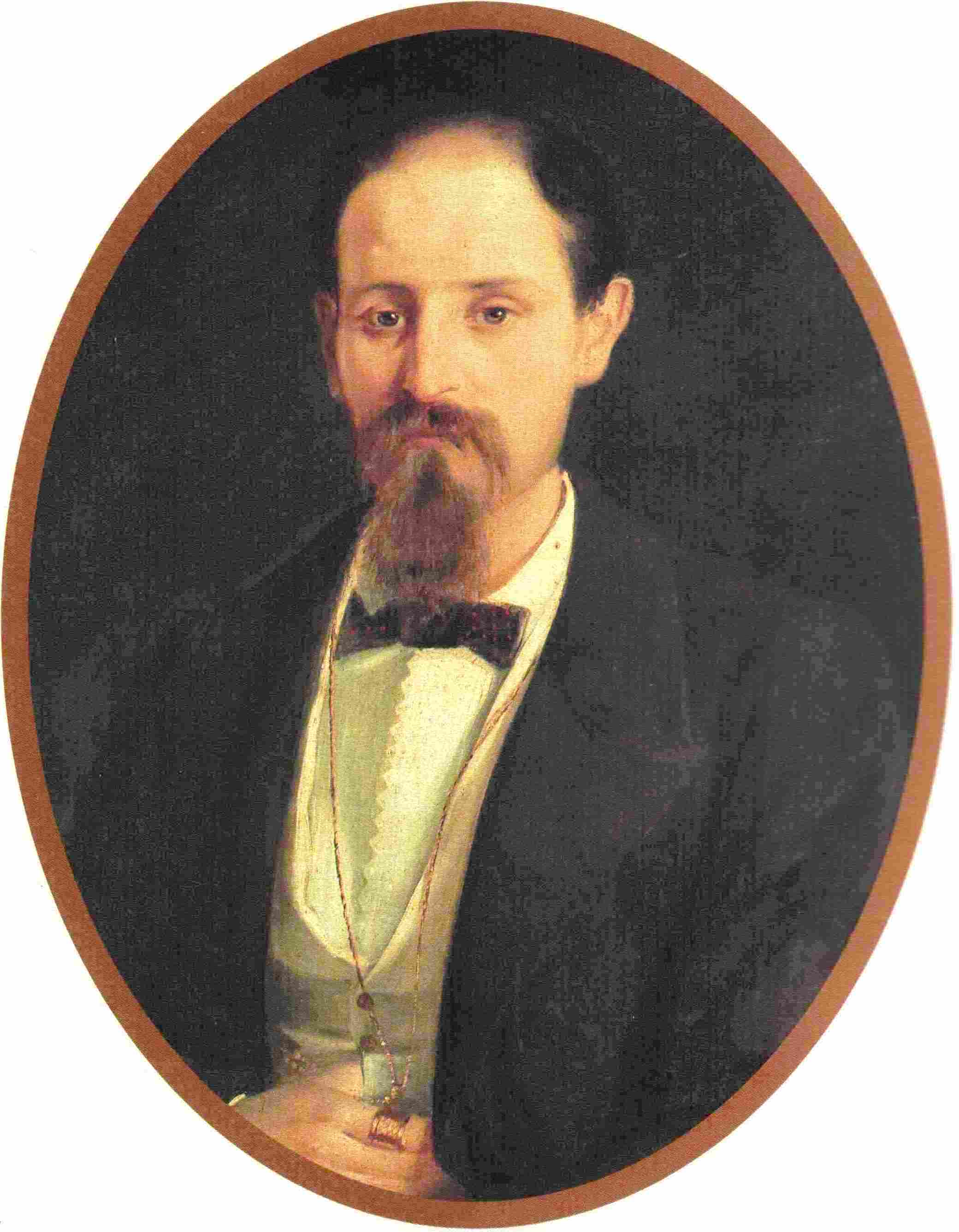
Rocco Bormioli (1830–1883), one of the founders along with his brothers Domenico, Carlo and his father Luigi.

Parma, Bormioli Rocco headquarters (1854)

The Bormioli family was originally from Altare, in the hinterland of Savona, where the family name was already known in the art of glass-making since the Middle-Age. The family name "Bormioli di Altare" can be tracked back to AD 1300, in the archives of Savona, for the purchase of soda (sodium carbonate).

In 1825, Luigi Bormioli left Altare (Province of Savona) and moved to Borgo San Donnino (renamed Fidenza in 1927) in the province of Parma. Luigi started a glassware company with money he inherited from his father. After Luigi's death in 1832, his wife Petronilla led the company for the next 22 years, together with her three sons.

In 1854 the company purchased the Royal Factory of Ceramics and Glasses Strada Farnese in Parma, and immediately changed its name to Brothers Bormioli Glassware. Over the next several years, the company mechanized its production and moved into a larger facility near San Leonardo.

In 1880, the company name was changed to Bormioli Rocco Glass and Son. Upon Rocco's death in 1893, his son Luigi took over. During World War I for the next two decades, Bormioli Rocco remained a major company in the region. employing more than 1,600 people, and had a worldwide sales network.

== Modern history ==
In the 1980s, the company acquired other companies in Italy and abroad, and again renamed itself, this time, as the Bormioli Group. The new company made glass products for the household sector, and industrial packaging for pharmaceutical, perfume, cosmetics and food use.

A financial crisis in the 1990s forced the company to cede a majority stake to Banca Popolare di Lodi. In subsequent years, the company became part of Gruppo Banca Popolare (through its subsidiaries and participations Spa Efibanca Italian), and in 2011 it was sold to private equity firm Vision Capital, which had 53% ownership. Italian entrepreneur Giovanni Bellavite owns a 17% stake in the company (~ 90 million).

== Landmark dates ==
- 1825 : Luigi Bormioli sets up the first glassworks in Fidenza where the development of the company has started.
- 1880 : After the acquisition of the "Royal factory of majolica and glassware" in Parma, The Bormioli family changes the business name into "Vetreria Fratelli Bormioli Rocco e Figlio spa".
- 1938 : The first automatic machine is assembled.
- 1946 : After the war bombings and the total destruction of the factory, the production is relaunched using the most advanced automation technologies.
- 1950–60 : Introduction of white glass for pharmaceutical containers and improvement of production equipment for tempered-glass tableware products. The company also expanded to a global presence.
- 1980–99 : From the beginning of the eighties to the end of the nineties the Rocco Bormioli firm has carried out a campaign of acquisitions of factories in Italy and abroad: Trezzano sul Naviglio, Castelguelfo and then Altare and Fidenza Vetraria in 1991, Verreries de Masnieres in 1993 and Azuqueca in 1997.
- 2004 : Banca Popolare di Lodi becomes the main shareholder of Bormioli Rocco & Figlio SpA.
- 2004 : The company closes its factory in Rive-de-Gier, France.
- 2011 : In June 2011 Vision Capital purchases the Bormioli Rocco Group.
- 2013 : Bormioli Rocco buys Neubor Glass.

== Brands ==
Brands within Bormioli Group:

- Bormioli Rocco: This brand is dedicated to tableware.
- inAlto: This brand is dedicated to professionals
- Fido: This brand is dedicated to airtight jars.
- Quattro Stagioni: This brand is dedicated to jars, lids and accessories.
- Frigoverre: This brand offers glass containers.
- B2B and Promotion: Works with B2B companies to create or personalize products and design promotional packaging and on-pack solutions.

== Key competitors ==
- Arc International (France), 1 billion euros revenue in 2009 and 8000 employees.
- Libbey (USA), 540 million euros revenue in 2009 and 6800 employees.
- Pasabahce (Turkey), 480 million euros revenue in 2009 and 5800 employees.
- Maghsoud factories group (Iran), 3000 employees.
- Vicrila Industrias del Vidrio S.L.U (Spain), 25 million euros revenue.
