= Arc Holdings =

French household goods company

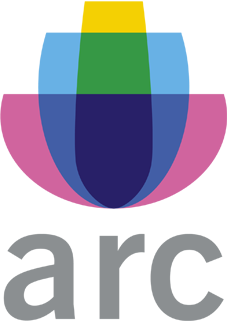
- Type: Simplified joint stock company
- Industry: activities of head offices
- Founded: 1825
- Founder: Georges Durand
- Headquarters: Arques, France
- Key people: Nicholas Hodler – Group CEO (since 1 August 2018); Rick Haythornthwaite – Executive Director
- Products: Glassware, tableware, cookware, storage, decoration
- Revenue: 811 millions € in 2019
- Owner: 100% private
- Number of employees: 7 500 employees around the world
- Parent: Arc

Arc Holdings is the holding company of the Arc Group, specializing in the design and manufacturing of glass tableware. The Arc Group markets its collections in France and exports them abroad under the registered trademarks Luminarc, Arcopal, Cristal d’Arques Paris, Arcoroc and Chef&Sommelier. It also designs products for the private label and B2B markets.

== History ==
=== 19th century ===
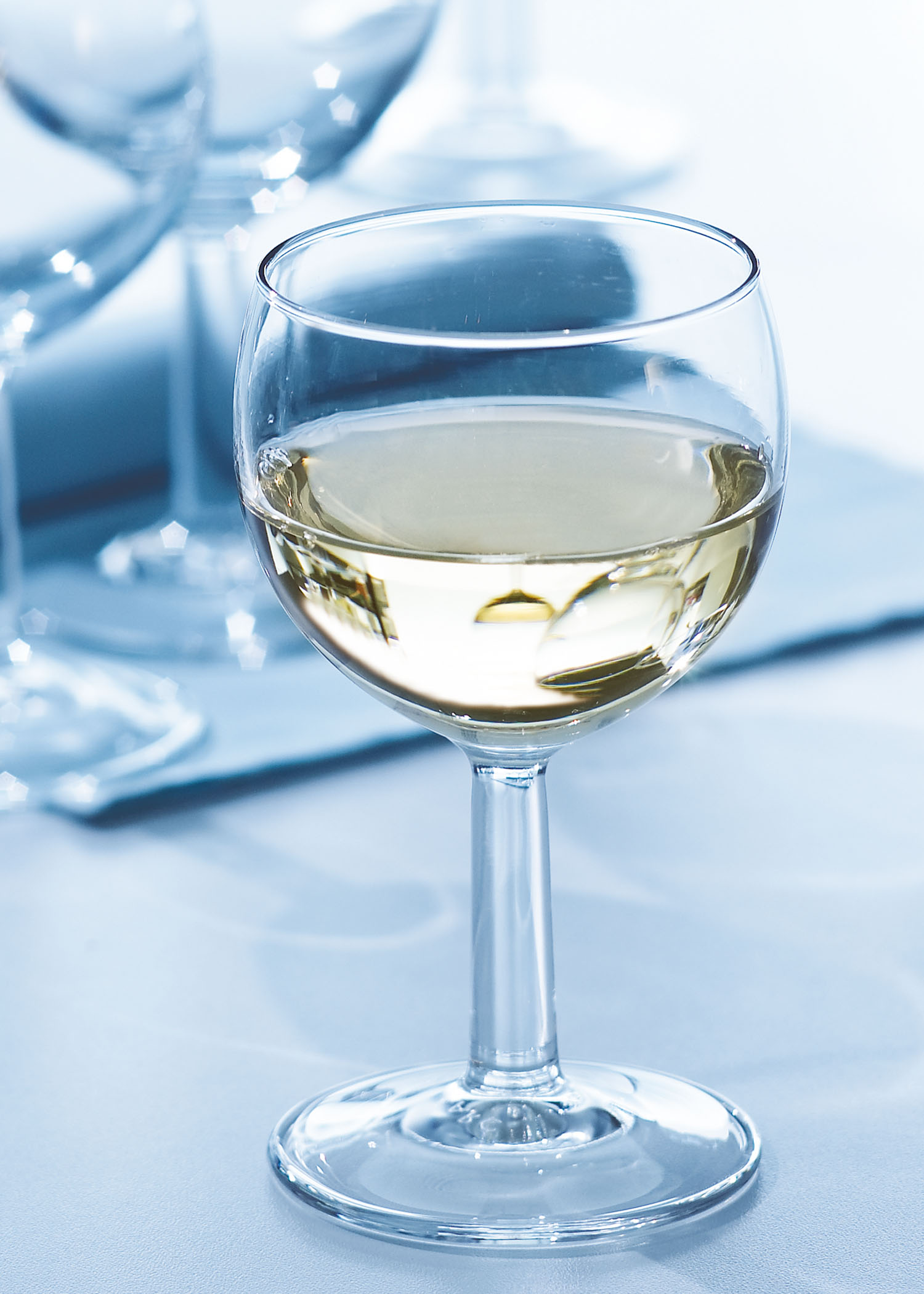
Arc ballon glass

In 1825, Alexander des Lyons de Noircarm created a glass-making firm under the name Verrerie des Sept Ecluses. On 8 April 1826, the firm partnered with the Carpentier-Mancel glassworks, founded in 1823 in Saint-Martin-au-Laërt by Charles Carpentier under his management. On 5 September 1835, an ordinance authorized Carpentier to build a new glasswork furnace. On 3 July 1853, the Arques glassworks was taken over by Mr. Allard and Mr. Ladey. It was damaged by a fire in July 1856 which caused the roofs to collapse. Once rebuilt, the glassworks was taken over by the company Ladey et Bléchet on 31 March 1863. In 1869, Alexandre des Lyons de Noircarme relinquished all his shares in the glassworks. On 10 August 1884, the company Ladey et Bléchet became Blechet et Collette and then on 16 October 1886, it became Bléchet et compagnie. The glassworks ceased operations in April 1887. Operations restarted in 1893 after the creation of SA Verrerie et Cristallerie d’Arques on 19 November 1892. On 26 July 1897, it was bought by Prudent Avot at a legal sale. Georges Durand, who had worked at the Sèvres crystal glassworks for three years, became the director. On 27 February 1900, he became a partner with the creation of the company Avot Durand. On 11 December 1916, the glassworks came under the exclusive control of Georges Durand, who founded the company G. Durand et cie.

=== 20th century ===
The glassworks initially established itself as one of the industrial jewels of Northern France before, over the years, becoming an international group and world leader in tableware. Development began in earnest in 1927, when Georges Durand's second son, Jacques, joined the company.

In 1930, Jacques Durand went to the United States to study American glassworks, which were already equipped with tank furnaces and automatic machines. He decided to develop innovative manufacturing techniques and gradually equipped the company with new machines which allowed for improved production while preserving the creativity of glassmaking. The first tank furnace was constructed and the first presses were installed in 1934.

After the Second World War, the Verrerie Cristallerie d’Arques continued its industrial expansion under the leadership of Jacques Durand, who was the co-owner of the company with his father in 1946. Jacques Durand benefited from the low interests rates for loans under the Marshall Plan to finish equipping the factory with the latest machines designed in the United States. In 1950, the glassworks, which had unique equipment in Europe, produced 15,000 tonnes of glass per year with a workforce of 993 people.

By the 1960s, the company had mastered the process of manufacturing stemware and launched the “Ballon” glass, the first stemware automatically produced, and other finer glassware products. One of Arc's signature products is the thick-walled ten-sided "working glasses" that were a staple of French kitchens after their introduction in 1978.

In 1968, the Verrerie Cristallerie d’Arques led a worldwide industrial revolution by managing to mechanize the production of crystal stemware. By 1980, the glassworks produced 250,000 tonnes of glass per year and employed 9,000 people in France, primarily in Arques.

From the 1930s to 2015, the company was dominated by the Durand family. The firm adopted a number of practices that positioned it to become one of Europe's leading mass production glassmakers.

From the 1980s onwards, the group began to internationalize its production with the creation of the Durand Glass Manufacturing Company (DGMC) in 1979, a production subsidiary based in Millville in New Jersey, which started production in 1982.

At the height of its production, the company manufactured more than 1.6 billion items per year delivered to 144 countries. It was the largest private company in the Nord-Pas-de-Calais region and the largest glass tableware company in the world.

Jacques Durand, who had been the driving force behind this expansion, died on 30 April 1997. The management of the glassworks was then taken over by his wife and one of his sons.

=== 21st century ===
In the 2000s, the Verrerie Cristallerie d’Arques changed its name, becoming Arc International, and its international locations grew in number: one production facility was created in Nanjing in China in 2003, another was acquired in 2004 in the emirate of Ras al Khaimah, and a third in Gous-Khroustalny in Russia in 2011.

This international development coincided with the difficulties faced by the group from the beginning of the 2000s. In 2004, losses exceeded €100 million. An initial employment protection plan led to almost 3,000 voluntary departures from the historic Arques site between 2004 and 2008. Two other voluntary departure plans were carried out in the following years and at the end of December 2012, the workforce at the site had halved from its number in 2004, decreasing from 12,000 employees to 6,000.

In 2014, the group was in need of money and sold its subsidiary which produces Pyrex products, Arc International Cookware (AIC) to the American investment fund Aurora Capital Group, and looked for new shareholders. On 29 August 2014, HIG Capital France and Arc International announced they had signed an agreement for the acquisition of the majority of Arc International's capital by HIG. This project would not be successful.

On 27 January 2015, following new economic difficulties, an employment protection plan was presented to the unions. This plan expected just under 200 redundancies.

On 16 March 2015, the Boulogne-sur-Mer commercial tribunal approved the takeover of Arc International presented by the American company Peaked Hill Partners (PHP) following agreement between the historical shareholders, the banks, the state and the investors. Creditors agreed to reduce the group's debt, which had risen to 280 million euros, to 62 million euros. The buyers were to pay 58 million euros to recapitalize the company in exchange for a new employment protection plan which, following negotiations with the unions, led to 195 redundancies and the creation of 233 new jobs at the historic Arques site.

This recapitalization allowed for the group's financial situation to be remedied.

In 2019, after two years of research, Arc created two new types of glass: culinary opal and colored opal, which allowed for the sale of collections of through-colored opal glass.

In early February 2021, the leadership of Arc announced the hiring of 225 on open-ended (CDI) contracts as a result of the partial operations agreement signed at the end of 2020.

== Research and development ==
More than 100 people, including several dozen engineers, work on multiple projects from basic research to product development and the development of new processes. Alongside the R&D teams, the Marketing teams participate in the development of new products or new lines of research according to the Corporate Social Responsibility (CSR) strategy set out by the Group's management.

== Brands ==
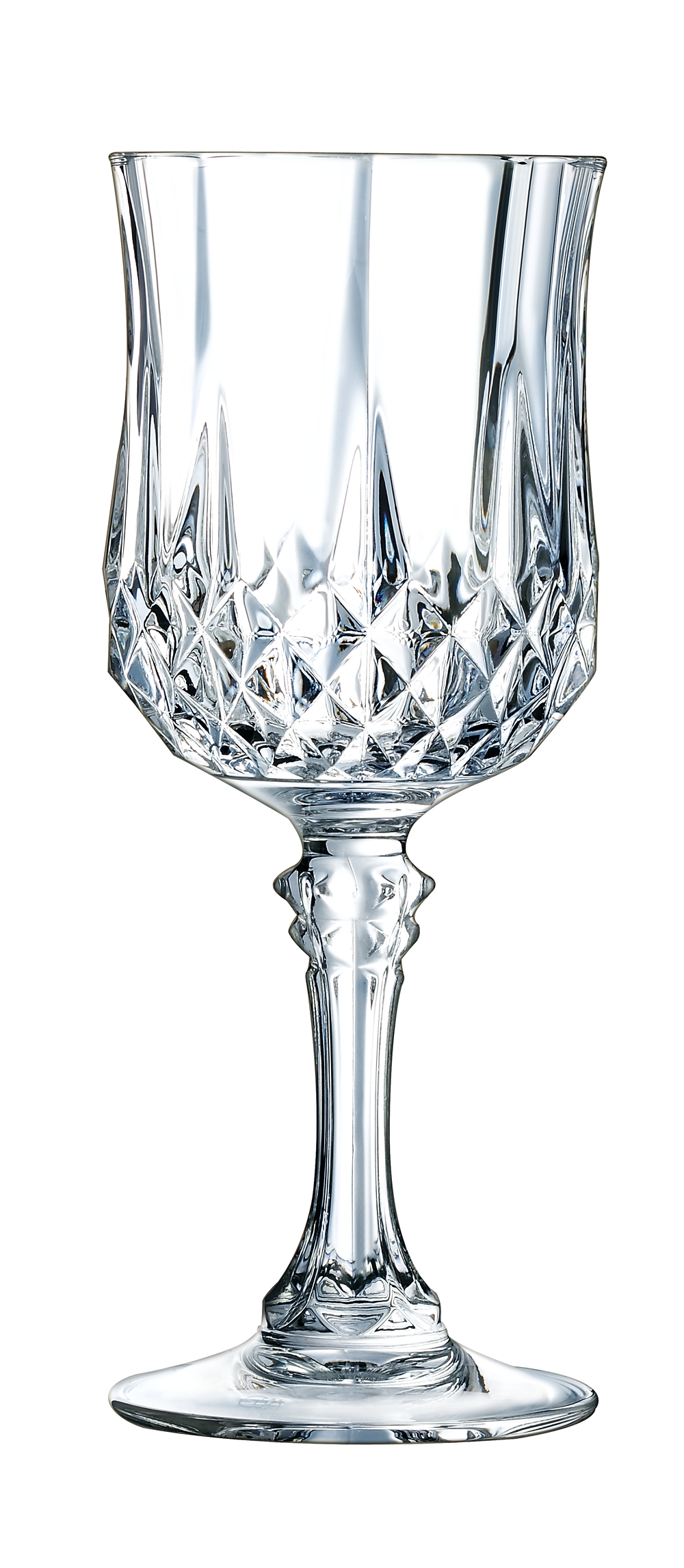
Stemware Longchamp - Cristal d'Arques

The Group distributes its collections under 5 commercial brands.

=== Consumer Goods brands ===
Luminarc : Created in 1948. First brand of the Arc group, Luminarc offers tableware and glassware in clear or decorated glass for everyday use.

Arcopal : Launched in 1958. Arcopal offers tableware in opal glass (flurosilicate) with vintage design.

Cristal d’Arques Paris : Created in 1968.

=== Food Service brands ===
Arcoroc : Established in 1958. Arcoroc offers glassware and crockery designed for intensive use to bars, hotels, restaurants and communities.

Chef&Sommelier : Created in 2008. Chef&Sommelier offers high-end glassware, tableware and cutlery for the hotel-restaurant industry as well as for retailers and tasting enthusiasts.

=== Division Business to Business ===
This division offers bespoke glass for professional clients: factories, manufacturers of semi-finished and finished products, distributors and service providers...

== Production ==
=== Figures ===
The Group produces more than 4.3 million items per day in its four factories: on the historic Arques site but also in the United States (since 1979), in China (since 2003), and in the United Arab Emirates (since 2004).

=== Production sites ===
- Arques, France : 4 400 employees
- Millville, USA (since 1979) : 900 employees
- Nankin, China (since 2003) : 1 100 employees
- Ras el Khaïmah : United Arab Emirates (since 2004) : 1 100 employees

== Key competitors ==
- Bormioli Rocco (Italy), 554 million euros revenue in 2011 and over 2500 employees.
- Libbey (USA), 540 million euros revenue in 2009 and 6800 employees.
- Paşabahçe (Turkey), 480 million euros revenue in 2009 and 5800 employees.
- Maghsoud Factories Group (Iran), 3000 employees.
- Kaveh Glass Industrial Group (Iran), 8000 employees and more than 20 factories.
- Vicrila Industrias del Vidrio S.L.U (Spain), 25 million euros revenue.
