= Back to Back (P.I.D. album) =

Studio album by P.I.D.
- Released: 1989
- Genre: Christian hip hop
- Label: Graceland

P.I.D. chronology
We Are Here (1988)	Back to Back (1989)	The Chosen Ones (1991)

Back to Back is the second album by Christian hip-hop group P.I.D., released in 1989 by Graceland Records.

== Critical reception ==
Jataun A. Shelton, writing for The St. Louis Review stated that the album "is proof that all rap music does not have to be rude and hard-core." Tony Cummings of Cross Rhythms called the album "as radical at its predecessor" and "as tough as they come.". Jamie Lee Baker of CCM Magazine, called it "the first authentic Christian hip hop album".

== Charts ==
Chart (1984)	Peak position
US Top Inspirational Albums (Billboard)	27
