= The Battle of the Bands (event) =

1845 musical competition in Paris, France

The Battle of the Bands was a musical competition held on April 22, 1845, at the Champ de Mars in Paris, France. Rather than a battle fought with weapons, it was a public demonstration between the bands of Adolphe Sax and Michele Carafa, along with four active French military bands of the time, organized to determine the future instrumentation of French military bands. The event, attended by an estimated 20,000 spectators, was commissioned by the France Ministry of War to evaluate whether Sax’s newly invented instruments—most notably his saxhorns and saxophones—should be adopted into official military use.

The live performance aimed to provide the commission with a direct comparison between traditional military instrumentation and Sax’s proposed innovations, amid growing concerns about the declining quality of French military bands relative to their Prussian and Austrian counterparts.

== Background ==
In the early 19th century, concerns about the inferior state of French military band were growing, especially in comparison to the demonstrated excellence of Prussian and Austrian bands. Prussia's superiority in military music, attributed to the German instrument maker Wilhelm Friedrich Wieprecht, prompted French unease. Wieprecht is credited with the invention of the tuba in 1835 and enhancements to the contrabassoon. Serving as the director of Prussian army bands, he introduced valved instruments to the band. These inventions and improvements had greatly increased the band's ability to project in an outdoor environment, the environment a military band would typically perform in.

Composer Hector Berlioz was particularly annoyed about this problem, as he had just returned from Germany and experienced the new instruments firsthand. He wrote in a letter to composer and poet Louise Bertin in 1835:

Our military bands are still without either rotary-valve trumpets or bass tubas (the most powerful of the lower instruments). If French military music is to achieve the standard of Prussian and Austrian, we will have to manufacture these instruments. A government order to Adolphe Sax for three hundred trumpets and a hundred bass tubas would be the salvation of him (Adolphe Sax).

At the time, French military bands still followed the Harmoniemusik tradition of the late 18th century, featuring instrumentation centered around oboes, bassoons, clarinets, and natural horns. Despite the evolution of musical instruments elsewhere in Europe, this traditional format had remained relatively unchanged since the Napoleonic era.

Following the French Revolution (1789–1799) and the Napoleonic Wars (1803–1815), France experienced decades of political turmoil, which included the restoration of the monarchy, a brief constitutional monarchy under King Louis-Philippe, and the rise of a new bourgeois state. By the 1840s, the French military was under pressure to modernize not only in arms and tactics but also in music. Military bands were viewed as both a reflection of national prestige and a practical tool for morale, discipline, and public ceremony.

In response to these challenges, the French Ministry of War established a commission in 1845 to investigate and recommend improvements to the organization, instrumentation, and size of French military bands. The commission included leading figures from both the musical and military spheres: composers Fromental Halévy, Daniel Auber, Gaspare Spontini, Adolphe Adam, and Michele Carafa, along with two scientists and two colonels. The commission was chaired by Général de Rumigny, a vocal advocate for reform and an early supporter of Adolphe Sax’s instrument designs.

== Event ==
The Commission decided that this public band competition would take place on April 22, 1845, at the Champ de Mars in Paris, then an open military parade ground, now the site of the Eiffel Tower.

=== Uneven Playing Field ===
Carafa, then 58 and well-connected, arrived with a polished 45-piece ensemble made up of experienced professors and elite students from the Gymnase musical militaire, the military music training institution he directed. He also attempted to sneak in four additional musicians, but this was rejected by the commission on the day of the event.

Adolphe Sax, on the other hand, arrived late and under pressure. In the days leading up to the event, seven or more of his players had been abducted or intimidated—allegedly by agents sympathetic to Carafa. Sax had to perform on two instruments himself to cover the gaps, and many of the musicians in his ensemble had only just received their newly designed instruments the day before, having had little time to rehearse with them.

Table 1: Carafa’s band
1 piccolo	2 cornets	2 natural horns
1 Eb clarinet	3 trumpets	2 valve horns
16 Bb clarinets	4 ophicleides	2 valve trombones
4 oboes		
4 bassoons		4 percussions

Table 2: Sax’s proposed instrumentation
1 piccolo	2 Eb soprano saxhorns	2 cornets
1 Eb clarinet	4 Bb saxhorns	6 valve trumpets
6 Bb clarinets	4 Eb tenor saxhorns	2 valve trombones
2 saxophones	2 Bb baritone saxhorns	2 slide trombones
	4 Eb contrabass saxhorns	4 ophicleides
		5 percussions

=== Program Order ===
The commission established a fixed repertoire to ensure fair comparison:

1. Andante by Adolphe Adam
2. A March by Adam
3. A Fast March (Pas Redoublé) by Alexandre Fessy – who was also conductor of Sax’s band and music director of the 5th Regiment of the Paris National Guard
4. A free-choice piece:
  1. Carafa selected an arrangement of the Overture to La Muette de Portici by Auber
  2. Sax presented Fantaisie No.1 pour musique militaire by Fessy, composed specifically to highlight his instruments, as noted on the title page of the published score.

Sax’s band was conducted by Fessy, while Carafa conducted his own group. The performance order remained consistent throughout, with Carafa’s band playing each work first.

=== Audience reactions ===
The auditory differences were striking. Carafa’s band, while technically polished, relied heavily on woodwinds, including oboes and bassoons—effective in indoor or chamber settings but largely ineffective outdoors. Sax’s band, though reduced to 38 players, included saxhorns, valved brass, and only a minority of woodwinds, proving to be far more powerful and sonorous in the open air.

The crowd responded enthusiastically to Sax’s performances, with noticeably louder applause after each of his band’s entries. His group’s low brass presence, including bass and contrabass saxhorns, provided a depth and projection that Carafa’s ensemble lacked. Though the saxophone itself was not audibly present due to the missing performer, its intended inclusion was documented in the published version of Fessy’s Fantaisie. Available to view on IMSLP, the title page of the published score bears a dedication to Général de Rumigny and mentions it was "composed for the new instruments invented by Ad. Sax, expressly for the contest on the Champ de Mars in 1845."

=== Outcome ===
The commission ultimately sided with Sax, officially recommending his instruments for French military bands in July 1845. The infantry band configuration incorporated 12 saxhorns and 2 saxophones, marking a significant departure from traditional instrumentation. This victory not only secured contracts for Sax but also established wider awarenesses of his new instruments.

The new contracts were never fulfilled, due to the February Revolution in 1848.

== Aftermath ==
Beyond the instrumentation changes, the commission issued a number of additional reforms aimed at professionalizing and modernizing military music in France:

1. Metronomes were officially recommended to "better conform to the intentions of the composers."
2. Flutes and other woodwind instruments were to be issued with government-funded carrying cases, acknowledging both the fragility of the instruments and the practical needs of military musicians.
3. A standardization of tuning practices, as inconsistencies between manufacturers had previously led to problems in ensemble performance.

These recommendations reflected a growing awareness of the need for logistical as well as musical modernization in the French military, moving beyond merely artistic concerns to questions of standardization, equipment protection, and performance discipline.
