= Shin-Shinano Frequency Converter =

HVDC back-to-back station in Japan

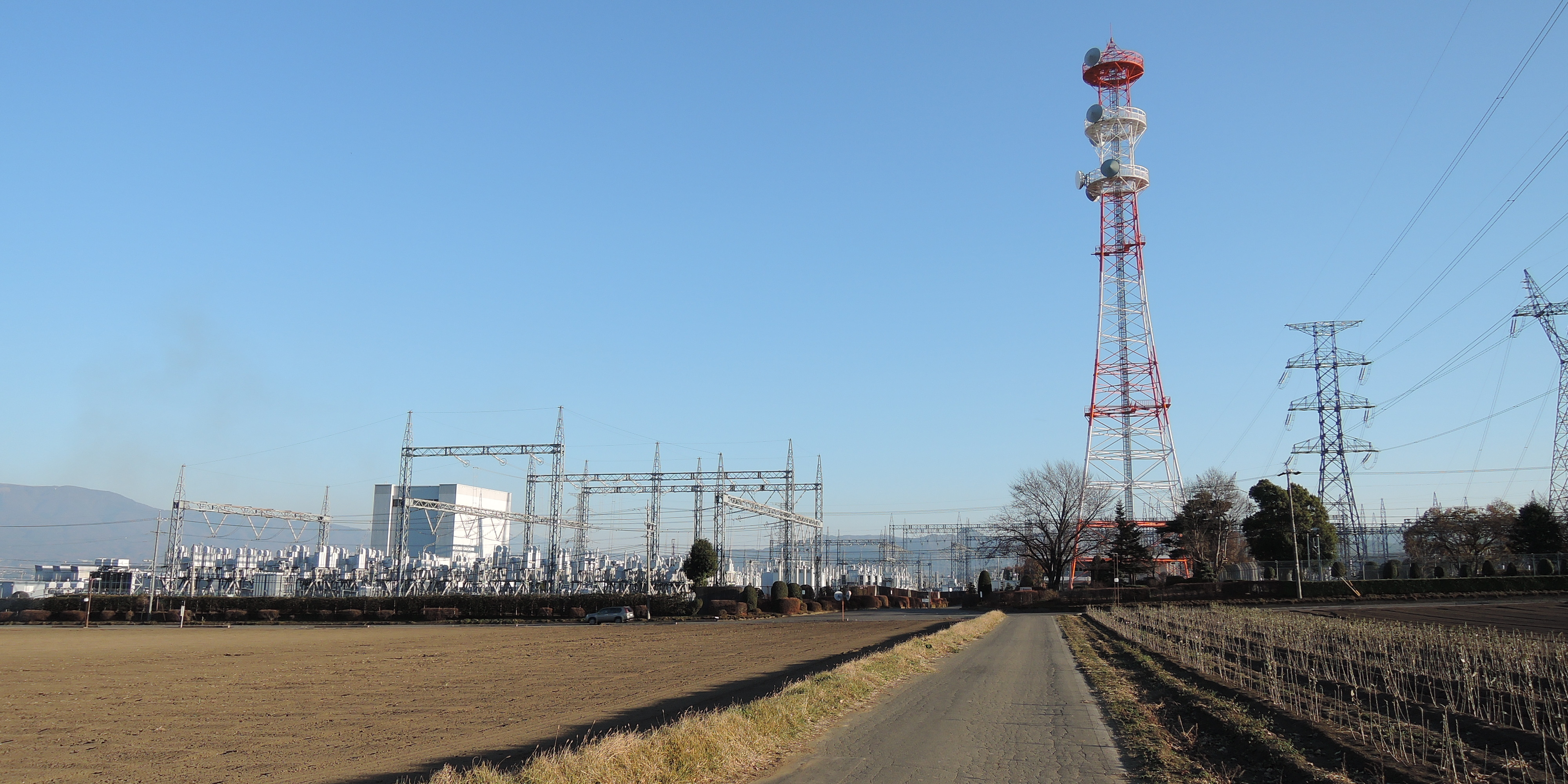
- Shin-Shinano Frequency Converter

Location
- Country: Japan
- Coordinates: 36°8′14″N 137°52′58″E

Ownership information
- Owner: TEPCO Power Grid (Tokyo Electric Power Company)

Construction information
- Substation installer: Hitachi & Toshiba
- Commissioned: 1977

Technical information
- Type: Back-to-back
- Current type: HVDC

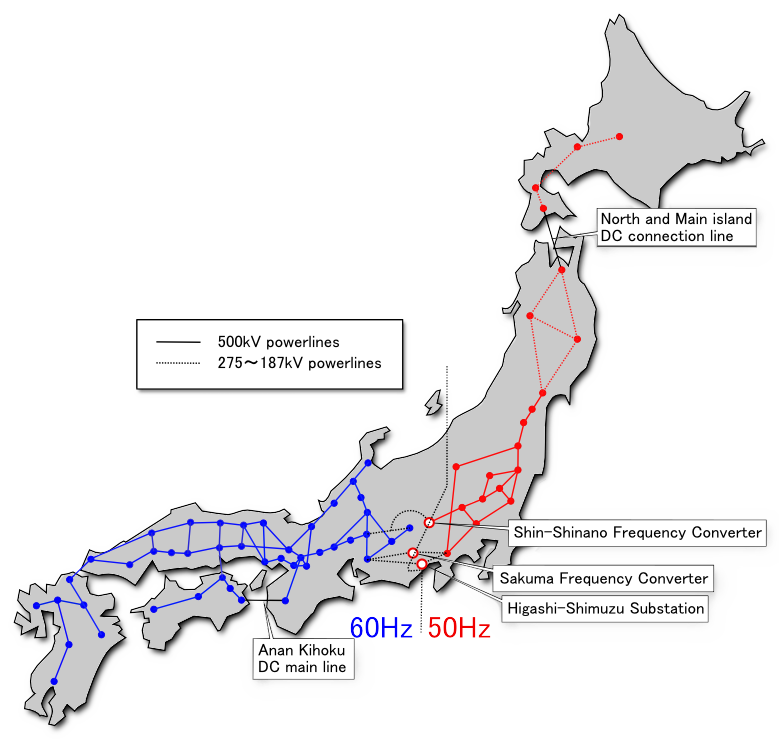
Location of Shin-Shinano and Japan's two utility frequencies

Shin-Shinano Frequency Converter (新信濃変電所, Shin Shinano Hendensho) is the designation of a back-to-back high-voltage direct current (HVDC) facility in Japan which forms one of four frequency converter stations that link Japan's western and eastern power grids. The other three stations are at Higashi-Shimizu, Minami-Fukumitsu, and Sakuma Dam.

== Converter equipment ==
The HVDC back-to-back facility Shin Shinano uses line-commutated thyristor converters. The station houses two converters, one of which opened in December 1977, the other in 1992. The original 1977 converter was one of the first thyristor-based HVDC schemes to be put into operation in the world and used oil-insulated, oil-cooled outdoor thyristor valves supplied by Hitachi (60 Hz end) and Toshiba (50 Hz end). A special workshop was provided on the site, in which valve maintenance (for example replacing failed thyristors) could be carried out under clean conditions in order to avoid contamination of the oil.

The 1992 converter uses more conventional air-insulated, water-cooled thyristor valves. In 2008 the original 1977 converter was decommissioned and replaced by a third converter, similar in design to the 1992 converter but using light-triggered thyristors.

The Shin-Shinano link operates with a DC link voltage of 125 kV for each converter. The station was initially rated at 300 MW. In 1992, with the addition of the second 300 MW converter, the maximum transferable power was uprated to 600 MW.

== See also ==
- Energy in Japan
- Kii Channel HVDC system
- HVDC Hokkaido–Honshu
