= Back to Basics =

Back to Basics or variants may refer to:

== Music ==
=== Albums ===
- Back to Basics (The Temptations album), 1983
- Back to Basics (Billy Bragg album), 1987
- Back to Basics (Alan Hull album), 1994
- Back to Basics (Anvil album), 2004
- Back to Basics (Beenie Man album), 2004
- Back to Basics (Christina Aguilera album), 2006, or the title track, "Intro (Back to Basics)"
  - Back to Basics Tour, a concert tour by Christina Aguilera
  - Back to Basics: Live and Down Under, a 2008 concert DVD by Christina Aguilera
- Back to Basics (Bill Wyman album), 2015
- Back to Basics (Maze album), 1993
- Back 2 Basics (Sway & King Tech album), 2005
- Back 2 Basics (Diljit Dosanjh album), 2012
- Back 2 Base X, a 2006 album by Hed PE
- Back to Basics: The Essential Collection 1971–1992, an album by Olivia Newton-John
- Back to Basics, a 1983 album by The Reddings
- Back to Basics, a 1986 album by The Manhattans
- Back to Basics, a 2008 album by Dr. Alban
- Back to Basics, 2004 album by Mike Metheny
- Back to the Basics (EP), a 2013 EP by Twista
- Back to the Basics (mixtape), a 2017 mixtape by Rich Homie Quan
- BTTB (album), 1999 album by Ryuichi Sakamoto
- Back 2 da Basics, 2006 album by Yo Gotti
- Back to the Basic (EP), 2010 album by Rain

=== Songs ===
- "Back to Basics" (song), a song by Headie One
- "Back to Basics", a song by Craig Davis from 22 (2022)
- "Back to Basics", a song by The Shapeshifters from Sound Advice

=== Other uses in music ===
- Back to Basics, a touring clubnight founded in Leeds in 1991 by Dave Beer

== Other uses ==
- Back to Basics (campaign), a 1993 UK initiative to relaunch the government of John Major
- Traditional education, or back-to-basics, long-established customs in schools
- "Back to Basics" (Doctors), a 2003 television episode
