= Higashi-Shimizu Frequency Converter =

HVDC back-to-back station in Japan

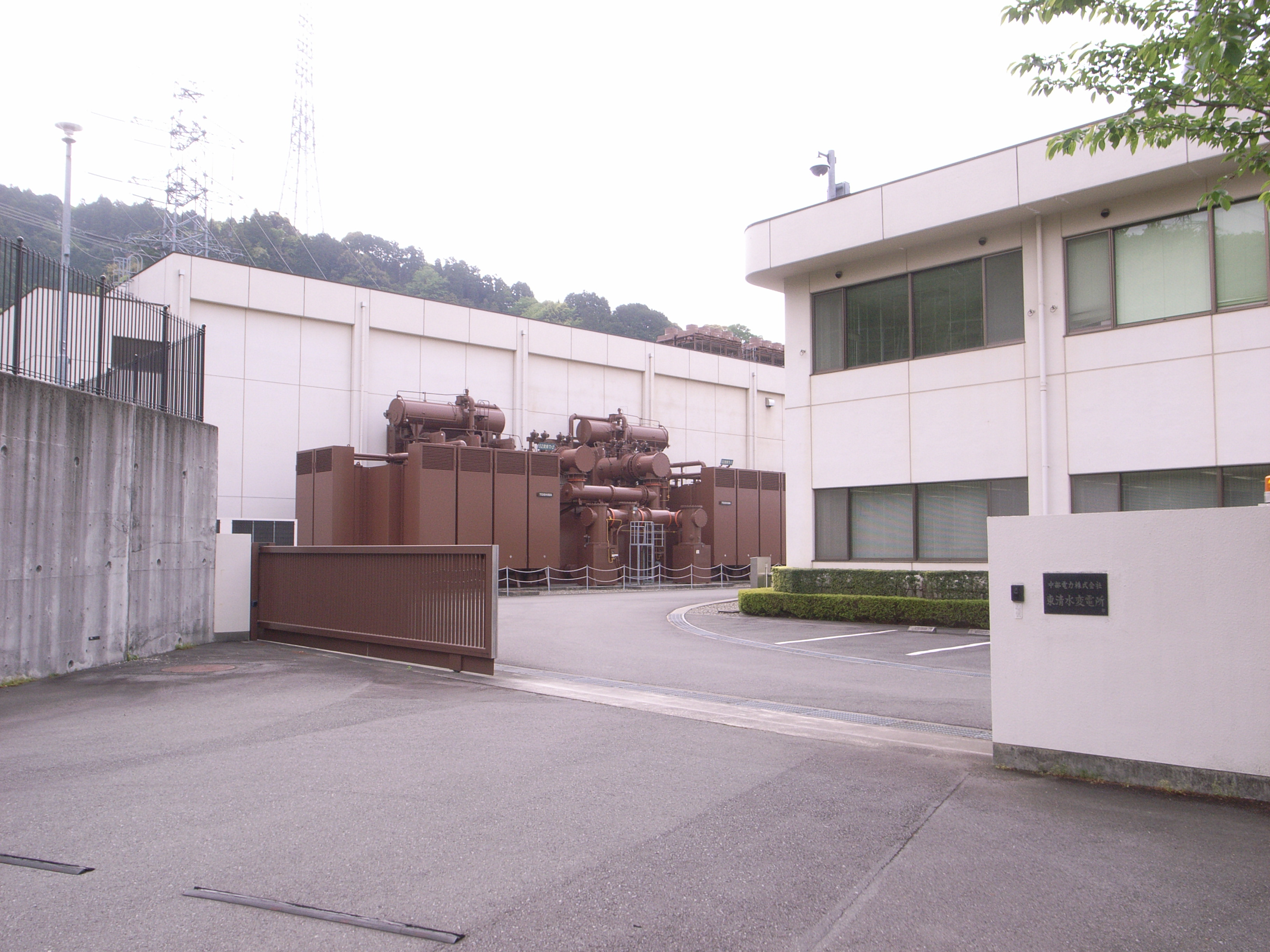
- Higashi-Shimizu Frequency Converter main gate

Location
- Country: Japan
- Province: Shizuoka Prefecture
- Coordinates: 35°03′29″N 138°30′00″E

Ownership information
- Owner: Chubu Electric Power Grid Company (Chubu Electric Power Company)

Construction information
- Commissioned: 2003

Technical information
- Type: Back to Back
- Current type: HVDC

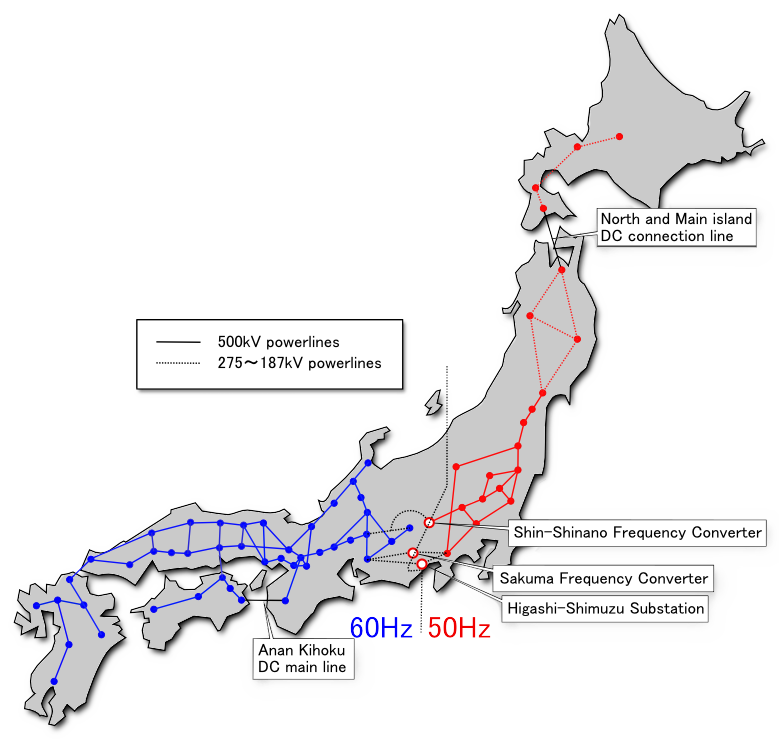
Location of Higashi-Shimizu and Japan's two utility frequencies

Schematic of Higashi-Shimizu Frequency Converter

Higashi-Shimizu Frequency Converter (東清水変電所, Higashi-Shimizu Hendensho) is the third facility in Japan for interconnecting the power grid of eastern Japan, which operates at 50 hertz, and that of western Japan, which operates at 60 hertz.

The Higashi-Shimizu Frequency Converter Station is operated by Chubu Electric Power Co. and is located at 677-3 Tanakake, Hirose-aza, Shimizu-ku, Shizuoka. It is fed via a 275 kV power line and a 154 kV power line. Its inverters operate at 125 kVDC and have a maximum transmission rate of 300 MW.

Japan's other converter stations are at Shin-Shinano in Nagano Prefecture, Sakuma Dam in Shizuoka Prefecture, and Minami-Fukumitsu in Toyama Prefecture.

== See also ==
- Electricity sector in Japan#Transmission
- Energy in Japan
