= Maximum demand indicator =

Rate of demand of an electric appliance

Maximum Demand Indicator (MDI) is an instrument for measuring the maximum amount of electrical energy required by a specific consumer during a given period of time. MDI instruments record the base load requirement of electrical energy. They can also measure the peak load, but are unable to record sudden short circuit or high motor starting currents.

The main parts of MDI are:

1. Dial connected with moving system
2. Pointer on dial
3. Reset device
4. Fraction device
5. Indicating pin

MDI is often available as a built-in feature of three phase energy meters.

Maximum demand is calculated as: Maximum Demand(KW)=(Maximum Energy Recorded(KWh))/Time(hours)
