= Minami-Fukumitsu Frequency Converter =

HVDC back-to-back station in Japan

Location
- Country: Japan
- Province: Toyama Prefecture
- Coordinates: 36.496187°N 136.915854°E

Ownership information
- Owner: Chubu Electric and Hokuriku Electric

Construction information
- Substation installer: Mitsubishi
- Commissioned: 1999

Technical information
- Type: Back to Back
- Current type: HVDC

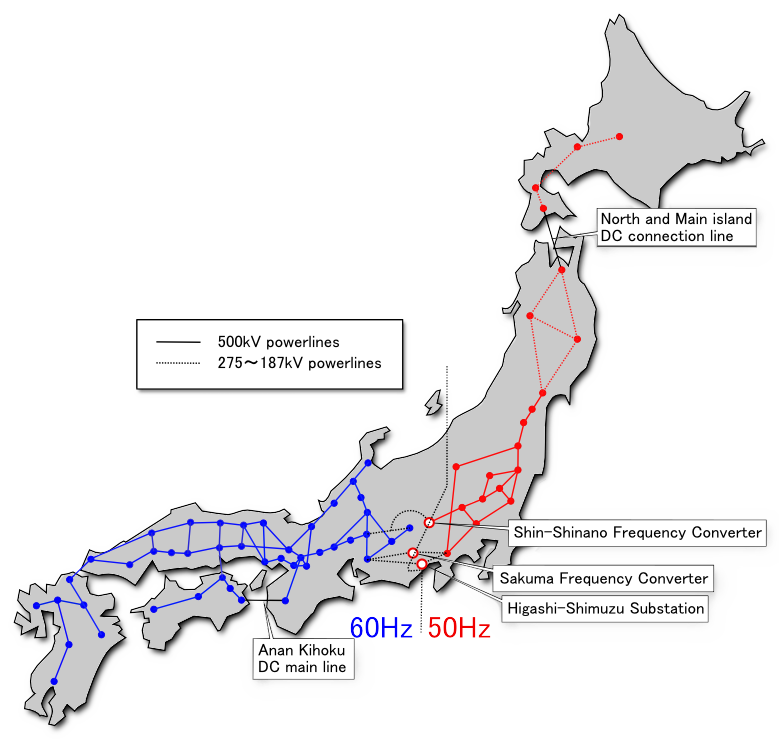
Japan's two utility frequencies

Minami-Fukumitsu Frequency Converter (南福光連系所, Minami-Fukumitsu Hendensho) is the name given to an HVDC back-to-back station for the interconnection of the power grids of western and eastern Japan. This facility went in service in March 1999. It operates with a voltage of 125 kV and can transfer a power up to 300 megawatts. The station is located in Nanto, Toyama Prefecture.
