= List of dams in Kochi Prefecture =

The following is a list of dams in Kochi Prefecture, Japan.

== List ==
Name	Location	Opened	Height (metres)	Image
Ananaigawa Dam			66.6	
Asemi Dam		1972	18.5	
Bunsui Dam		2005		
Futo-ike Dam		1956	15.5	
Haruto Dam			31	
Hatsuse Dam		1937	23	
Himenoi-ike Dam		1960	20	
Hiranabe Dam		1960	38	
Iburi Dam		2005	30.5	
Iejigawa Dam				
Ikadatsu Dam		1958	25.5	
Ikanazu Dam				
Inamura Dam		1982	88	
Iokigawa Dam		1954	22.8	
Iwakura-ike Dam		1967	22	
Jiruzo-ike Dam		1955	21.5	
Kagami Dam			47	
Kamaidani Dam		1997	27.3	
Kawaguchi Dam				
Kirimi Dam		1988	69	
Kuki Dam		1963	28	
Maruzuka-ike Dam		1965	28.2	
Nagasawa Dam			71.5	
Nagase Dam		1956	87	
Nakasujigawa Dam			73.1	
Nishiyama Dam		1997	27.2	
Odani Dam				
Odo Dam		1986	96	
Ohashi Dam			73.5	
Ohmorigawa Dam			73.2	
Okuide Dam		1991	18.7	
Sakamoto Dam		2000	60.3	
Sakuraga-ike Dam		1919	20	
Sameura Dam		1975	106	
Shigeto Dam				
Suita Dam		1959	44	
Tsuga Dam			45.5	
Ushinoikeda Dam		1965	20	
Wajiki Dam			51	
Yanase Dam		1970	115	
Yasuba Dam			18	
Yokozegawa Dam		2019	72.1	
Yoshino Dam		1953	26.9	

== See also ==
- Media related to Dams in Kochi prefecture at Wikimedia Commons
