= Nagashima (disambiguation) =

Nagashima was a series of Ikkō-ikki fortresses in Japan.

Nagashima may also refer to:

== Places ==
- Nagashima, Kagoshima
  - Nagashima Island, Kagoshima
- Nagashima, Mie
  - Nagashima Spa Land, an amusement park
  - Nagashima Station, a railway station
- Nagashima Dam
  - Nagashima Dam Station

== People with the surname ==
- Hideyuki Nagashima (長島 偉之, born 1953), Japanese sport wrestler
- Hiroshi Nagashima (born 1966), Japanese boxer
- Kazushige Nagashima (born 1966), professional baseball player, son of Shigeo Nagashima
- Keiichiro Nagashima (長島 圭一郎, born 1982), Japanese speed skater
- Shigeo Nagashima (1936–2025), Japanese baseball player and manager
- Yūichi Nagashima (born 1957), Japanese voice actor and actor
- Yuichiro Nagashima (born 1984), Japanese kick boxer and cosplayer
- Yūko Nagashima (born 1969), Japanese voice actress
- Yurie Nagashima (born 1973), photographer

== See also ==
- Nagashima Ohno & Tsunematsu, a law firm
