= Ōhashi Dam =

Dam in Kōchi Prefecture, Japan

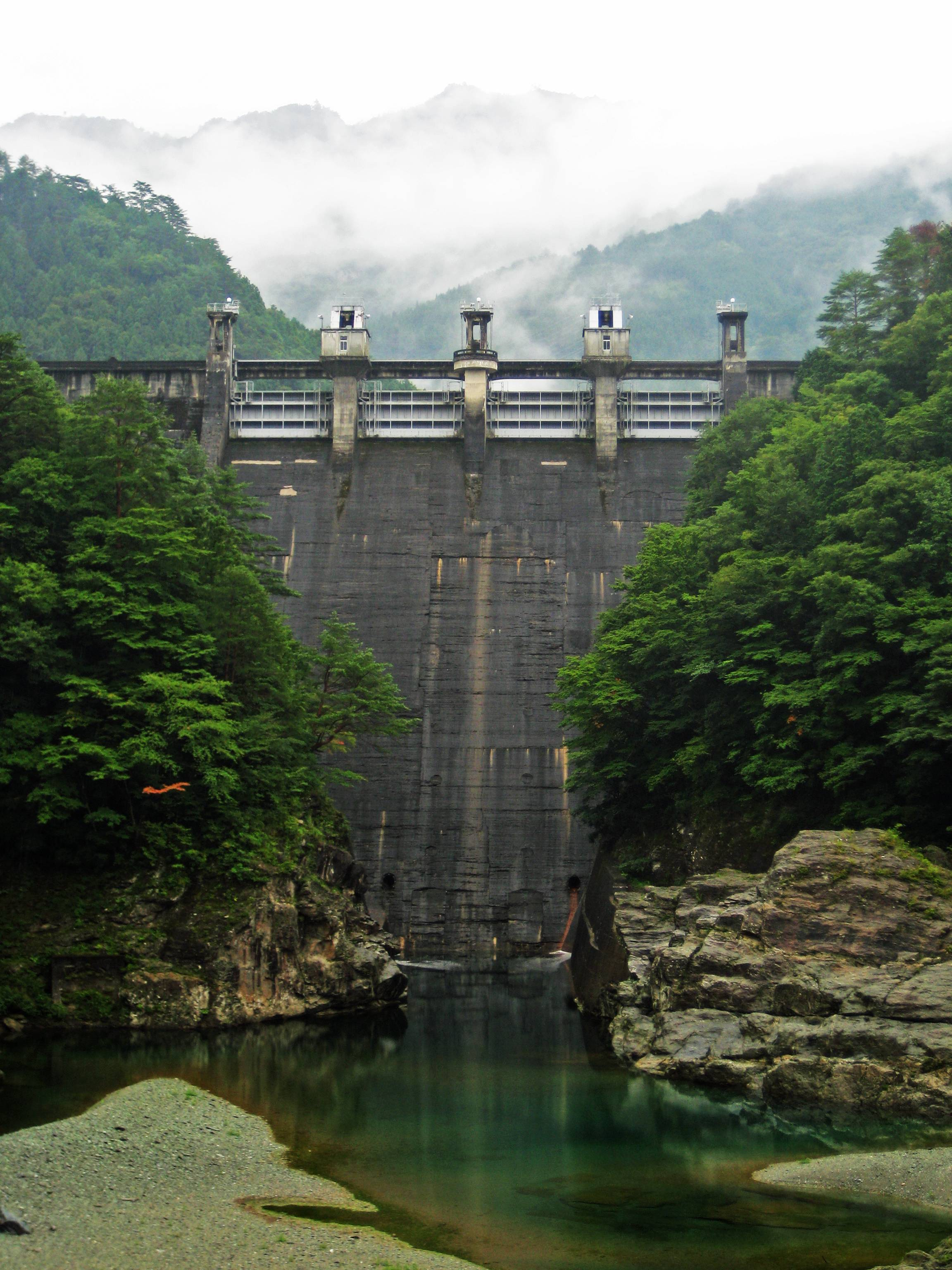
- Interactive map of Ōhashi Dam
- Location: Kōchi Prefecture, Japan
- Coordinates: 33°46′13″N 133°20′12″E

Ōhashi Dam (大橋ダム) is a dam built on the Yoshino River in Agawa District, Kōchi Prefecture of Japan. This concrete dam 73.5 m high. It is a hydroelectric dam of the Shikoku Electric Power Company. It supplies water to the company's hydroelectric plant, Ōhashi Power Station, which can produce up to 5,500 kW. It is the lower reservoir for a pumped-storage hydroelectric plant. The upper reservoir being Inamura Dam. Water flowing between these two can produce up to 615MW. It is a public works which The Japan Society of Civil Engineers has recommended as a site of Public Works Heritage.

== Construction ==
The Yoshino River flows through Shikoku with an abundant volume. In the upper reaches there are swift currents so it was a suitable place for hydroelectric power generation. In Ehime Prefecture the Sumitomo Group have many factories and the Besshi copper mine. Tosa City-Yoshino River Hydroelectric Company (currently Sumitomo Joint Electric Power Company) was founded to promote the construction of the hydroelectric power station, on the Yoshino River, in 1919, (Taishō period 8).

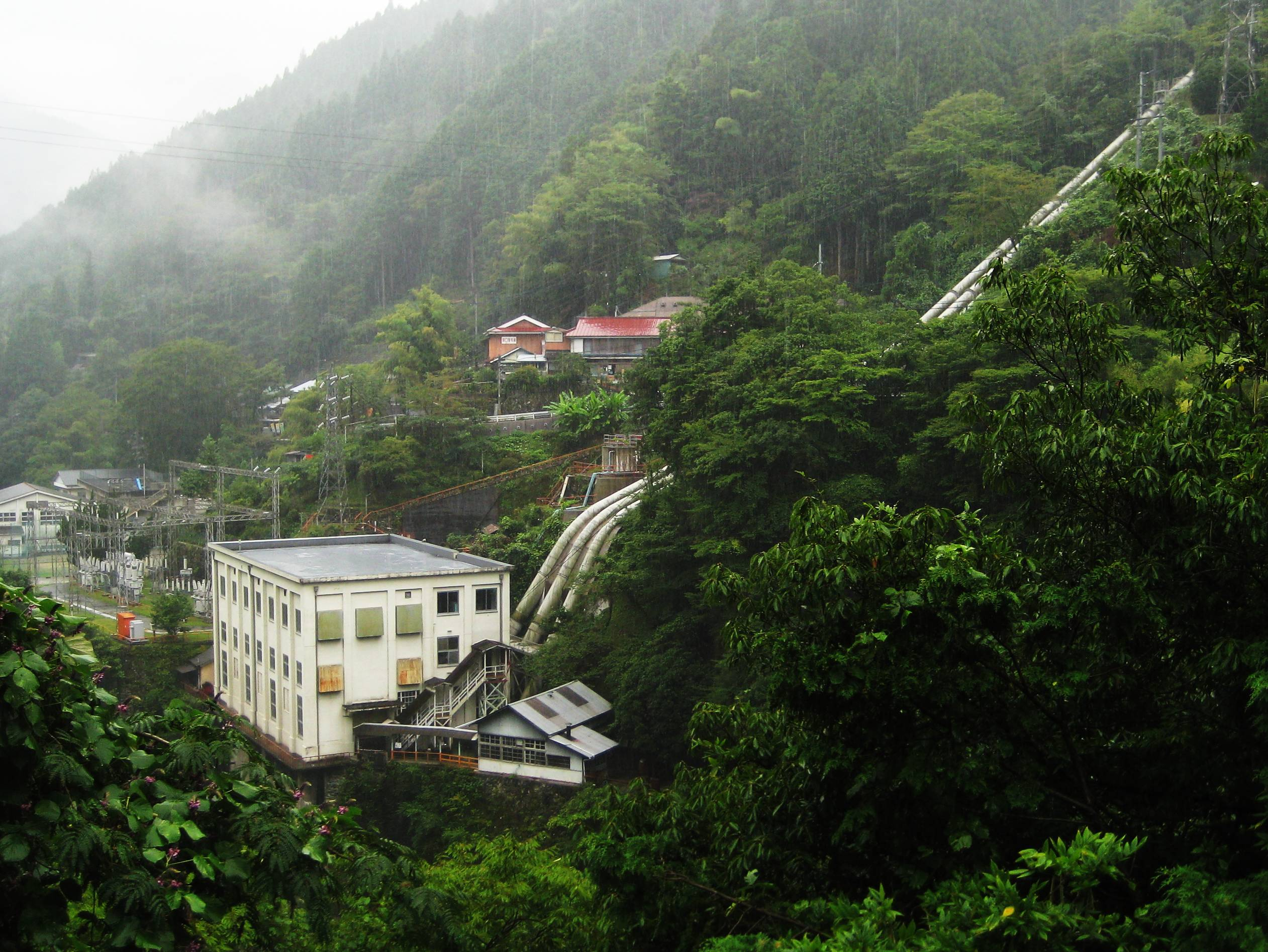
Takayabu Power Station

The Takayabu Power Station, (14.3MW), was built at the Okuyoshino torrents of the upper reach of River Yoshino, and it commenced operation in 1930 (Shōwa period 5).

This company conceived of further developing the upper reaches of the river. Diverting the water flow of Yoshino River, separating the watershed, to the south flowing Edagawagawa River of the Niyodo River (仁淀川, Niyodo-gawa) drainage system, and planned to perform hydroelectric power generation utilising that volume of water and the topography. However, in this plan, the diversion of water did not avoid the decrease in the volume of water flowing downstream. Because of this, a plan was made to regulate the quantity water flowing in the river by forming a large-scale artificial lake and building the Ōhashi Dam between Takayabu Power Station and the upstream inflow.

In 1934 (Showa 9), the Tosa-Yoshino River Hydroelectric Company was renamed the Central Shikoku Electric Power Company, and from 1937 (Showa 12) work started on the Ōhashi Dam. Engineers who took part in the Pujon River Dam on the Korean Peninsula and the construction of the Senzu Dam of the Ōi River drainage system in Shizuoka Prefecture were invited to the construction to study the concrete mix. The results of the geological survey were to confirm that rock suitable for concrete aggregate could not be collected from around the dam's construction site. Therefore, an overhead freight-carrying cable was built to Shougase (勝賀瀬) in the Niyodo River Basin, 22 km to the south and, rock was collected to and brought from there. The Ōhashi Dam was completed in 1939 (Showa 14). In the same year, Ōhashi Power Station, using water from the Ōhashi Dam, started production (at that time 5.3 MW).

After that, Central Shikoku Electric Power Company, went ahead with the construction of a diversion canal from up stream of the Ōhashi Dam to the Niyodo River. In 1940 (Showa 15) the First Diverted Water Power Station (26.6 MW), and in 1941 (Showa 16) the Second Diverted Water Power Station (7.8 MW), and Third Diverted Water Power Stations (10.9 MW) started operation. However, in the meantime, the Japanese government had an eye on the state control of the electric utilities, and steadily advanced preparations for the establishment of the Japan Electric Generation and Transmission Company (日本発送電株式会社, Nippon Hassoden kabushiki-kaisha) in 1939. The Central Shikoku Electric Power Company financed many hydroelectric power stations such as starting the Ōhashi Dam and Diverted Water System Power Stations, the Japan Electric Generation and Transmission Company, and the Shikoku Electric Distribution Co. (四国配電, Shikokuhaiden) with electric distribution companies established under similar state control. In 1943 (Showa 18) it changed its name to the present Sumitomo Group of electric power companies. Japan Electric Generation and Transmission Company took over the development of the improving Central Shikoku Electric Power Company. In 1949 (Showa 24), upstream of Ōhashi Dam, as well as Nagasawa Dam (5.2 MW), in 1950 (Showa 25) at the water diversion's lowest point the Fourth Diverted Water Power Station (8.1 MW) was completed.
