= Tsuga (disambiguation) =

Tsuga is a genus of conifers.

Tsuga may also refer to:

- Tsuga, Tochigi, a town in Japan
- Tsuga Station, a railway station in Chiba, Japan
- Tsuga Dam, a dam in Kōchi Prefecture, Japan
- Japanese destroyer Tsuga (1920), a ship of the Imperial Japanese Navy
- Kazuhiro Tsuga, Japanese businessman

== See also ==
- Iwami-Tsuga Station
