= Iejigawa Station =

Railway station in Shimanto, Kōchi Prefecture, Japan

G28 Iejigawa Station 家地川駅
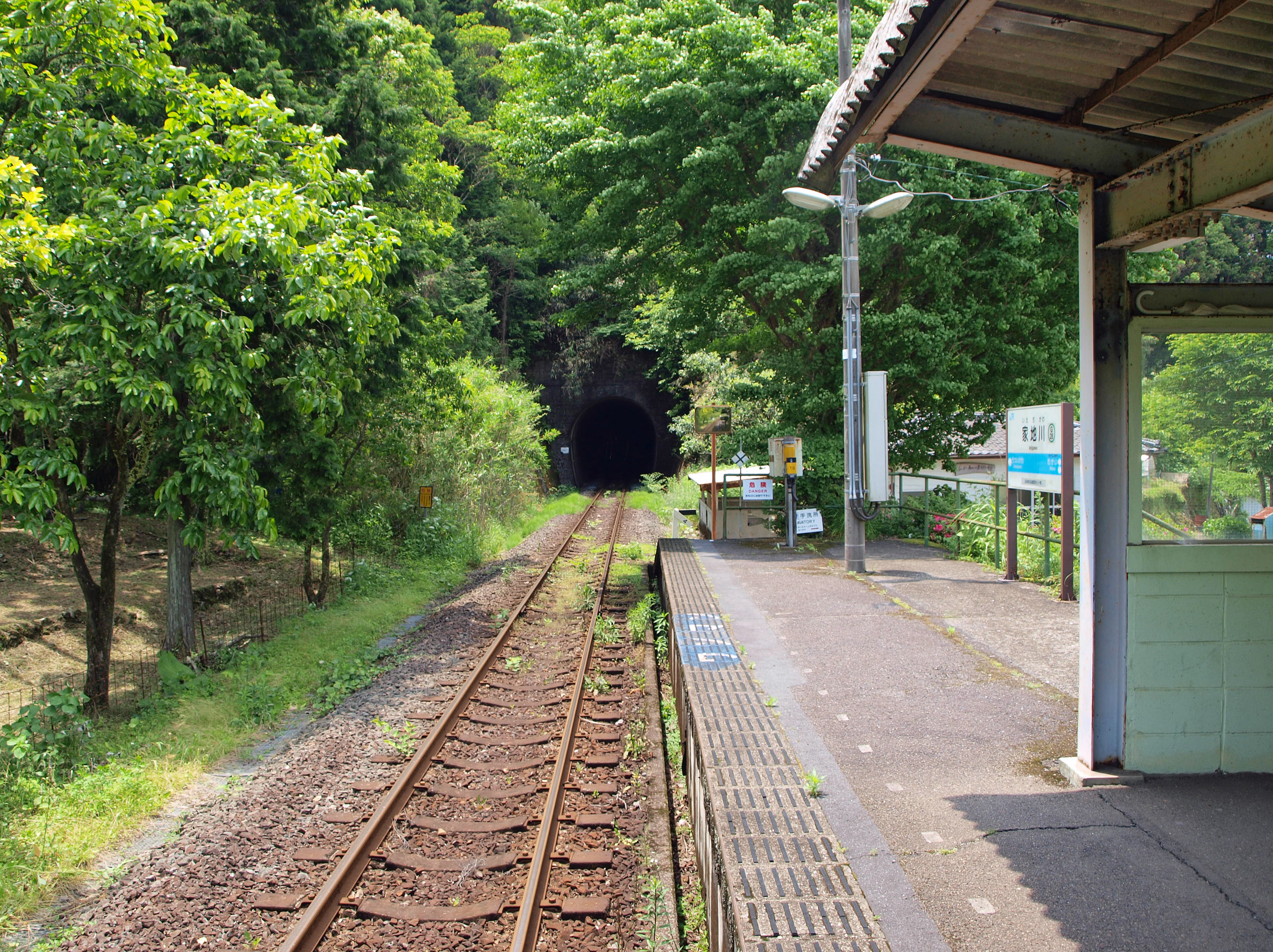
- A view of the platform of Iejigawa station in 2010.

General information
- Location: Iejigawa, Shimanto-chō, Takaoka-gun, Kōchi-ken 786-0064; Japan
- Coordinates: 33°09′41″N 133°04′29″E
- Operator: JR Shikoku
- Line: ■ Yodo Line
- Distance: 5.8 km from Wakai
- Platforms: 1 side platform
- Tracks: 1

Construction
- Parking: Available
- Cycle facilities: Bike shed
- Accessible: No - steps lead up to platform

Other information
- Status: Unstaffed
- Station code: G28

History
- Opened: 1 March 1974

Passengers
- FY2018: 2

Services
Preceding station	JR Shikoku	Following station
Utsuigawa G29 towards Uwajima	Yodo Line	Wakai G27 towards Kubokawa
Location
- Location within Kochi Prefecture Location within Japan

Iejigawa Station (家地川駅, Iejigawa-eki) is a passenger railway station located in the town of Shimanto, Takaoka District, Kōchi, Japan. It is operated by Shikoku Railway Company (JR Shikoku). It has the station number "G28".

== Lines ==
The station is served by JR Shikoku's Yodo Line, and is 5.8 kilometers from the starting point of the line at Wakai Station.

== Layout ==
Iejigawa Station, which is unstaffed, is on an embankment and consists of a side platform serving a single track. There is no station building, only a shelter for waiting passengers. An access road leads to a paved compound at the base of the embankment where car may be parked. Around the compound there is a toilet building, a bike shed and a public telephone call box. A flight of steps leads up from the compound to the platform. The station is not wheelchair accessible.

== History ==
The station opened on 1 March 1974 under the control of Japanese National Railways. After the privatization of JNR on 1 April 1987, control of the station passed to JR Shikoku.

== Surrounding area ==
- Iejigawa Dam (家地川ダム) - a weir across the Shimanto River.
- Iejigawa Park (家地川公園) - a local park on both sides of the Shimanto River with some 300 cherry trees.

== See also ==
- List of railway stations in Japan
