= Nagashima Dam =

Dam in Shizuoka Prefecture, Japan

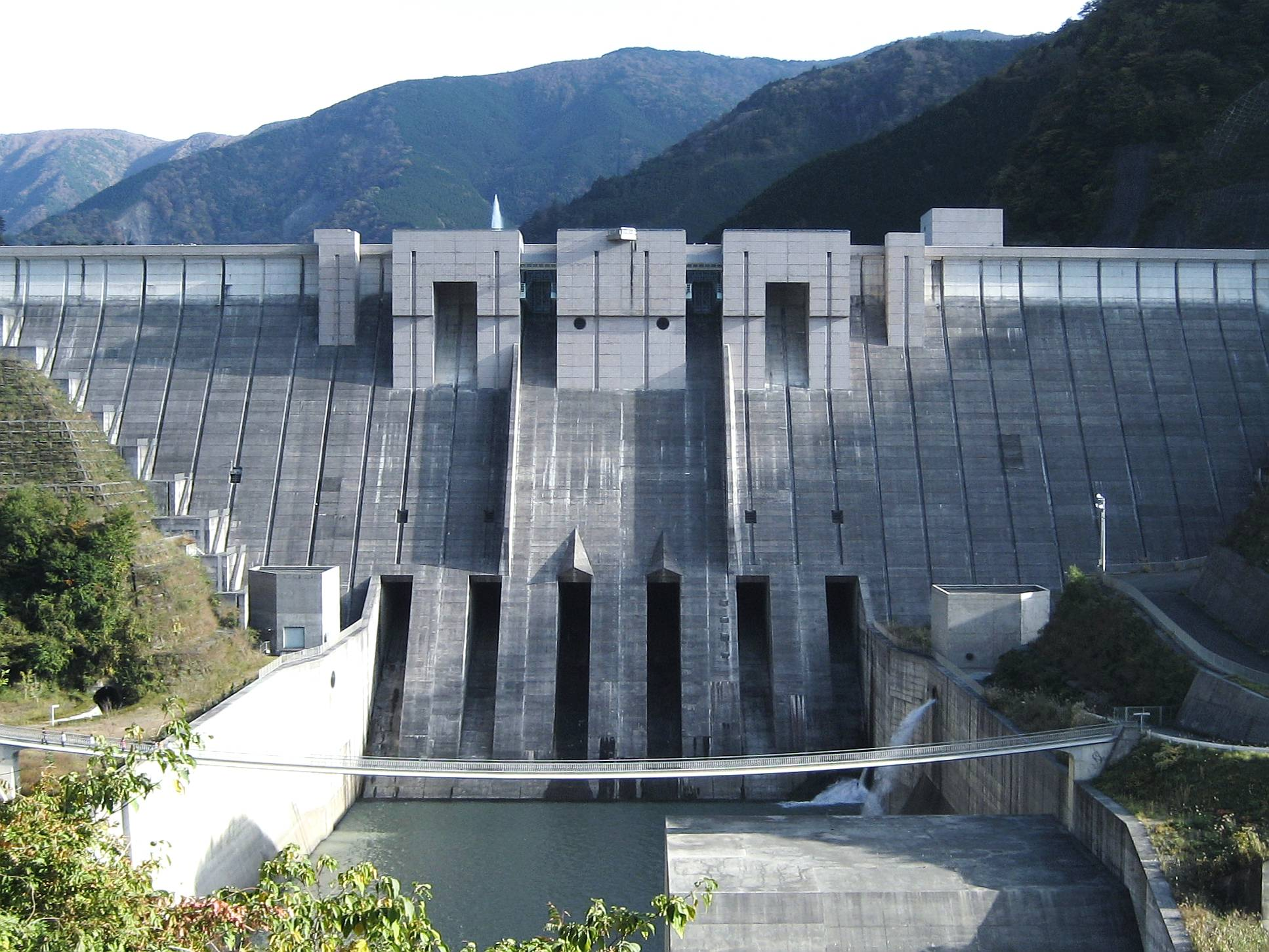
- Interactive map of Nagashima Dam
- Official name: 長島ダム
- Location: Shizuoka Prefecture, Japan
- Coordinates: 35°09′58″N 138°09′19″E
- Construction began: 1972; 54 years ago
- Opening date: 2002; 24 years ago
- Operator: Ministry of Land, Infrastructure, Transport and Tourism

Dam and spillways
- Impounds: Ōi River
- Height: 109 meters
- Length: 308 meters

Reservoir
- Creates: Nagashima Reservoir
- Total capacity: 78,000,000 m^{3}
- Catchment area: 534.3 km^{2}
- Surface area: 230 hectares

The Nagashima Dam (長島ダム, Nagashima damu) is a dam on the Ōi River, located in Kawanehon Town, Haibara District, Shizuoka Prefecture on the island of Honshū, Japan.

== History ==
The potential of the Ōi River valley for hydroelectric power development was realized by the Meiji government at the start of the twentieth century. The Ōi River was characterized by a high volume of flow and a fast current. Its mountainous upper reaches and tributaries were areas of steep valleys and abundant rainfall, and were sparsely populated. In 1906, a joint venture company, the Anglo-Japanese Hydroelectric Company (日英水力電気, Nichiei Suiroku Denki) was established, and began studies and design work on plans to exploit the potential of the Ōi River and Fuji River in Shizuoka Prefecture. The British interests were bought out by 1921, and the company was renamed Hayakawa Electric (早川電力, Hayakawa Denryoku). By the mid-1950s, several dams had been completed on the upper reaches of the Ōi River and its tributaries.

In September 1954, a typhoon caused flooding in the downstream reaches of the Ōi River, leading to plans being drawn by the central government in Tokyo for a new dam, which was justified as a "multipurpose" dam to provide industrial water, agricultural water in addition to flood control. Work was delayed due to lack of budget in the 1960s, with the construction of the Tōkaidō Shinkansen and Tōmei Expressway, but was given additional impetus due to the "Tanabata Flood" of July 1974 which flooded most of downtown Shizuoka.

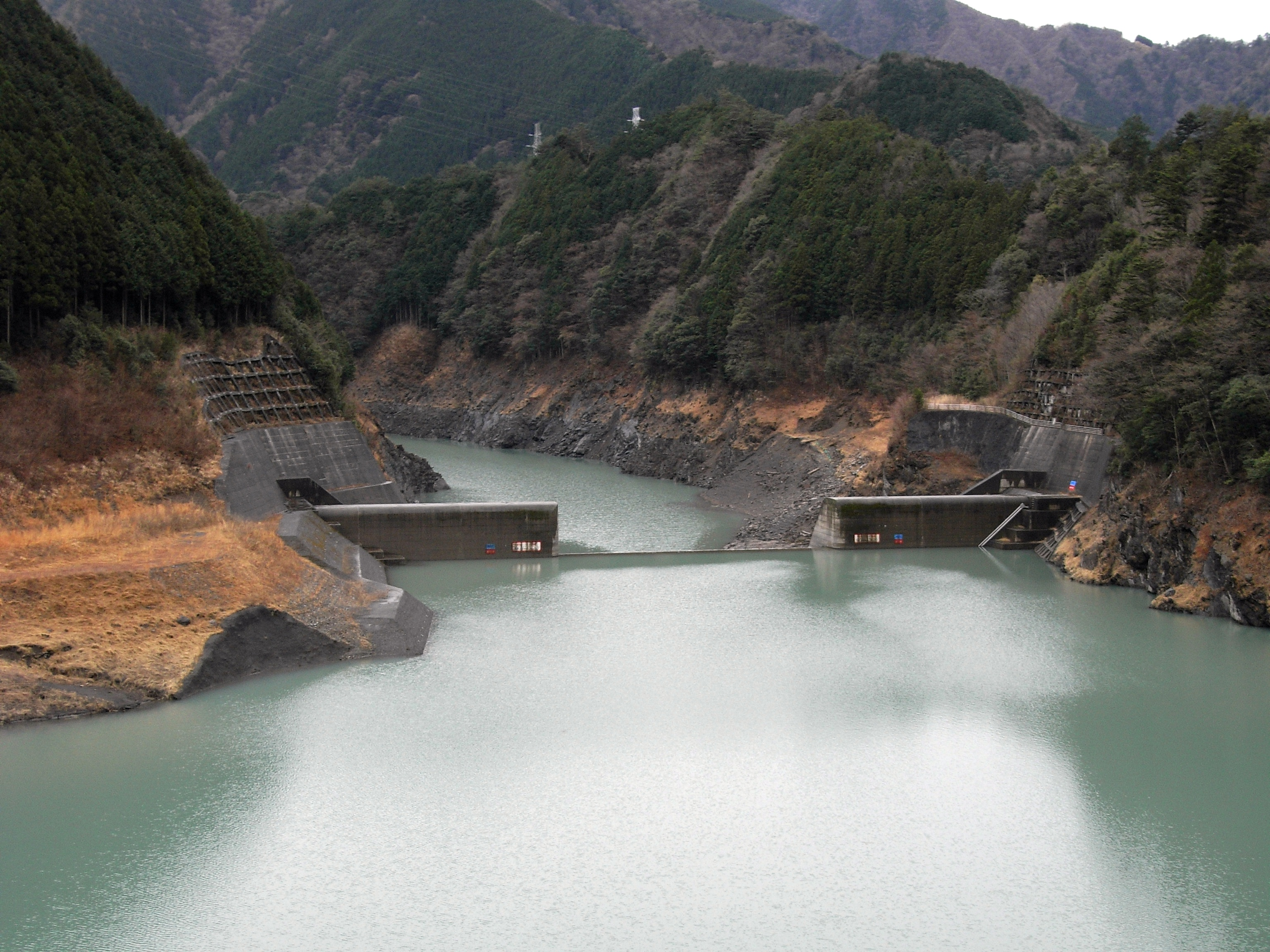
Nagashima check dam

Construction work began on the Nagashima Dam in 1972 and was completed by 2002 by a consortium of the Maeda Corporation, Shimizu Corporation and the Takenaka Corporation. Work was facilitated by the proximity of the dam to the Ōigawa Railway.

== Design ==
The Nagashima Dam is a hollow core concrete gravity dam with central spillways. It is not equipped with any hydroelectric generation capability. It is now operated and maintained by the Ministry of Land, Infrastructure, Transport and Tourism.

In order to avoid silting problems as was experienced with the Senzu Dam, the Nagashima Dam is equipped with a large secondary check dam upstream, the first in Japan to be constructed with the cemented sand and gravel method. This dam reduces the current, causing most of the sand and silt to settle before it reaches the main Nagashima Dam. Under normal conditions, this check dam is completely underwater and cannot be seen from the surface.

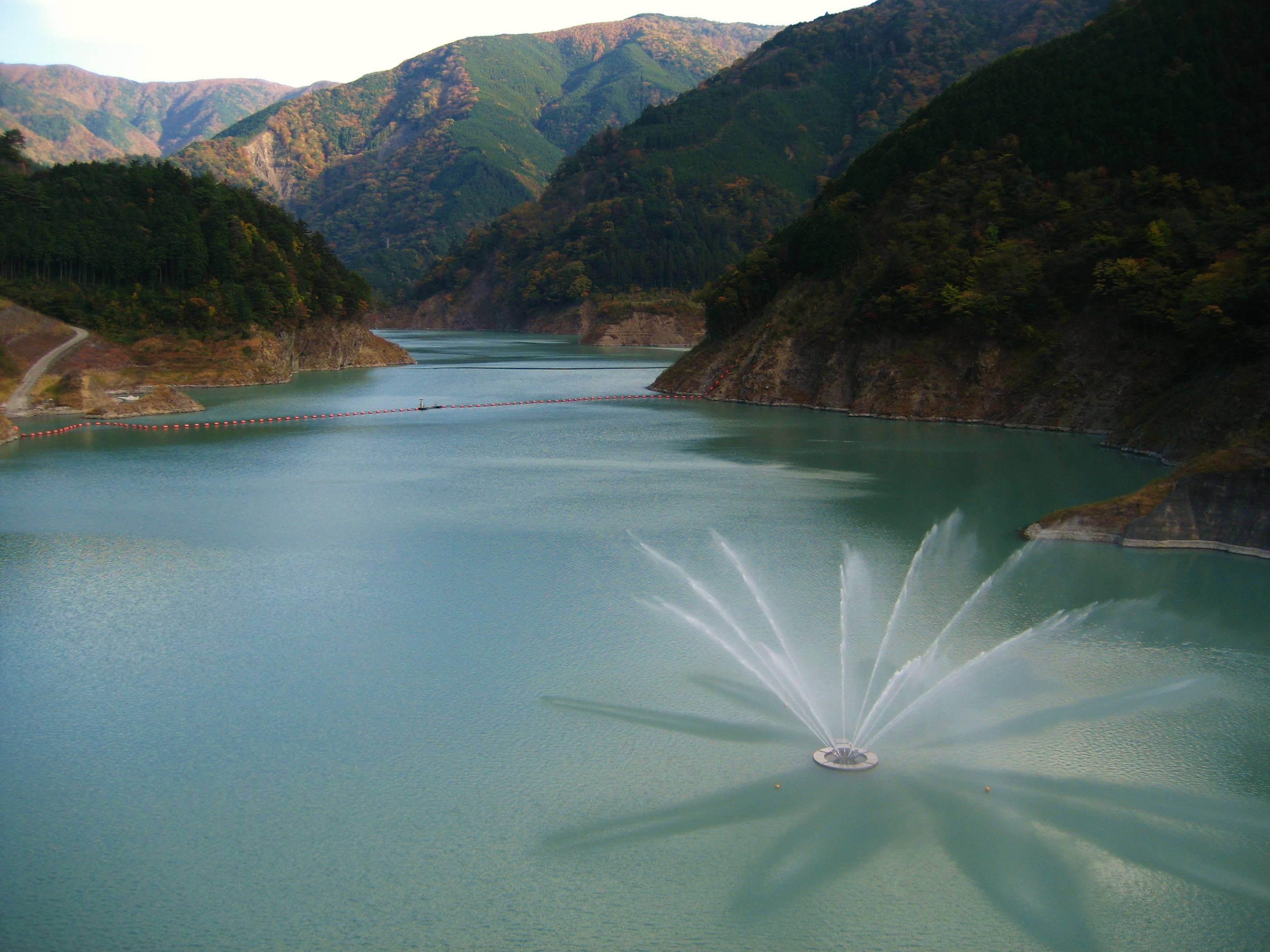
Nagashima Dam Reservoir

== Surroundings ==
The Nagashima Dam Reservoir is a popular attraction for canoeing, fishing and camping, and for its proximity to hot spring resorts and the steam locomotives operated by the Ōigawa Railway. The nearest train station is the Nagashima Dam Station. The area is popular with mountain climbers heading towards the high peaks of the Minami Alps National Park.
