= Utsuigawa Station =

Railway station in Shimanto, Kōchi Prefecture, Japan

G29 Utsuigawa Station 打井川駅
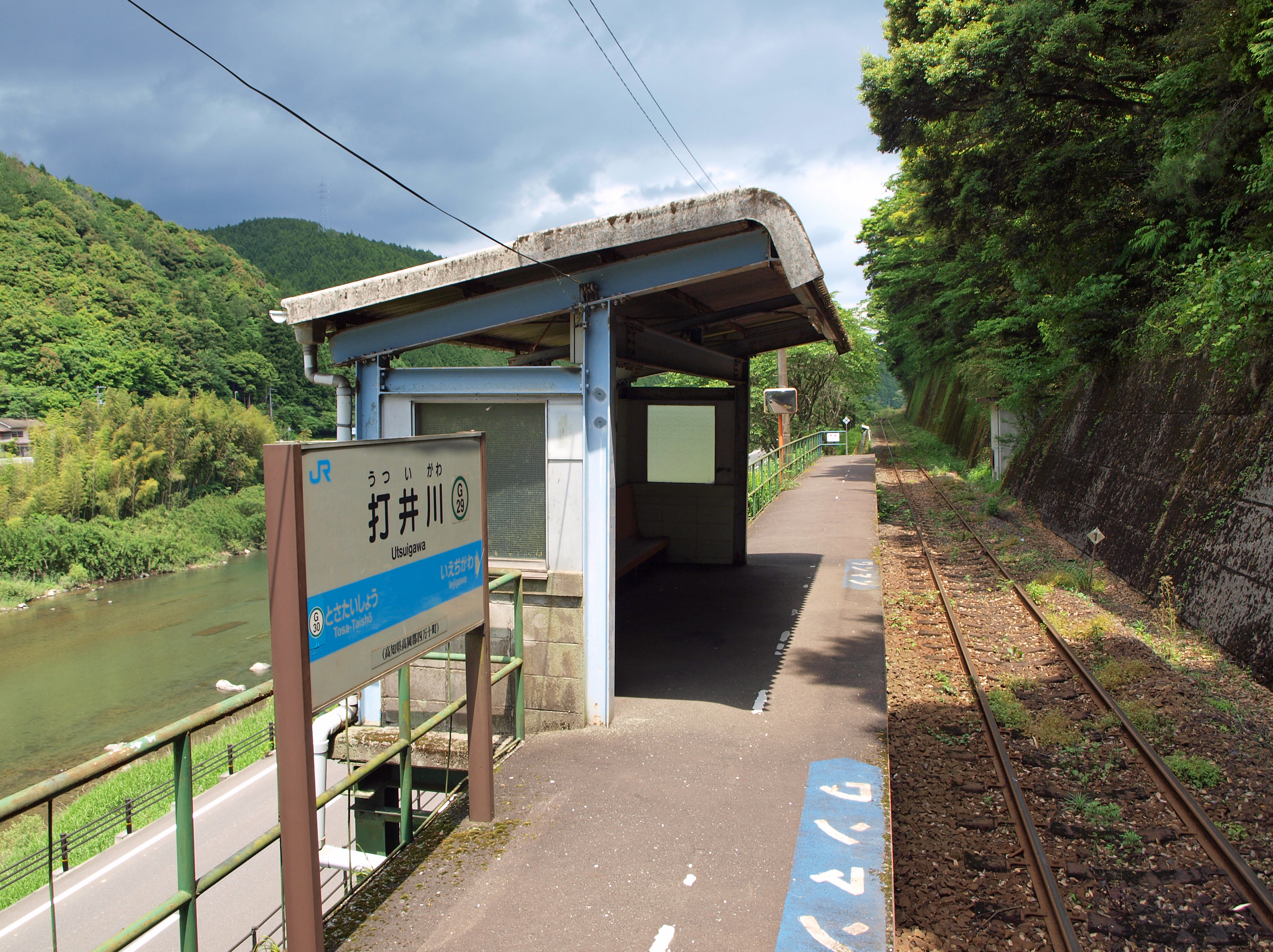
- Utsuigawa Station in 2010, looking in the direction of Iejigawa. The Shimanto River can be seen to the left.

General information
- Location: Utsuigawa, Shimanto-chō, Takaoka-gun, Kōchi-ken 786-0322; Japan
- Coordinates: 33°10′32″N 133°01′51″E
- Operator: JR Shikoku
- Line: ■ Yodo Line
- Distance: 10.7 km from Wakai
- Platforms: 1 side platform
- Tracks: 1
- Connections: Bus stop

Construction
- Parking: On side of road
- Cycle facilities: Bike shed
- Accessible: No - steps lead up to platform

Other information
- Status: Unstaffed
- Station code: G29

History
- Opened: 1 March 1974

Passengers
- FY2018: 0
Location
- Location within Kochi Prefecture Location within Japan

Utsuigawa Station (打井川駅, Utsuigawa-eki) is a passenger railway station located in the town of Shimanto, Takaoka District, Kōchi, Japan. It is operated by Shikoku Railway Company (JR Shikoku). It has the station number "G29".

== Lines ==
The station is served by JR Shikoku's Yodo Line, and is 10.7 kilometers from the starting point of the line at Wakai Station.

== Layout ==
Utsuigawa Station, which is unstaffed, is on an embankment and consists of a side platform serving a single track. There is no station building, only a shelter for waiting passengers. A flight of steps leads up from the road to the platform. The station is not wheelchair accessible. A bike shed and toilet are set up at the base of the embankment. Parking is by the side of the road.

== Adjacent stations ==
«	Service	»
JR Shikoku
Yodo Line
Iejigawa	-	Tosa-Taishō

== History ==
The station opened on 1 March 1974 under the control of Japanese National Railways. After the privatization of JNR on 1 April 1987, control of the station passed to JR Shikoku.

== Surrounding area ==
- The Shimanto River runs parallel to the track in the vicinity of the station.
- National Route 381 runs parallel to the track on the opposite riverbank.
- The Kaiyodo Hobby Museum - a museum with exhibits of anime figurines and models from the Kaiyodo company.

== See also ==
- List of railway stations in Japan
