= Wajiki Dam =

Dam in Kochi Prefecture, Japan

- Location within Japan
- Official name: 和食ダム
- Location: Kochi Prefecture, Japan
- Coordinates: 33°33′03″N 133°48′21″E
- Construction began: 1992

Dam and spillways
- Height: 51 m (167 ft)
- Length: 121.5 m (399 ft)

Reservoir
- Total capacity: 730,000 m^{3} (26,000,000 cu ft)
- Catchment area: 1.9 km^{2} (0.73 sq mi)
- Surface area: 7 hectares (17 acres)

Wajiki Dam (Japanese: 和食ダム) is a gravity dam located in Kochi Prefecture in Japan. The dam is used for flood control and water supply. The catchment area of the dam is 1.9 km^{2}. The dam impounds about 7 ha of land when full and can store 730 thousand cubic meters of water. The construction of the dam was started on 1992 and completed in 2024.

== See also ==
- List of dams in Japan
