= Yasuba Dam =

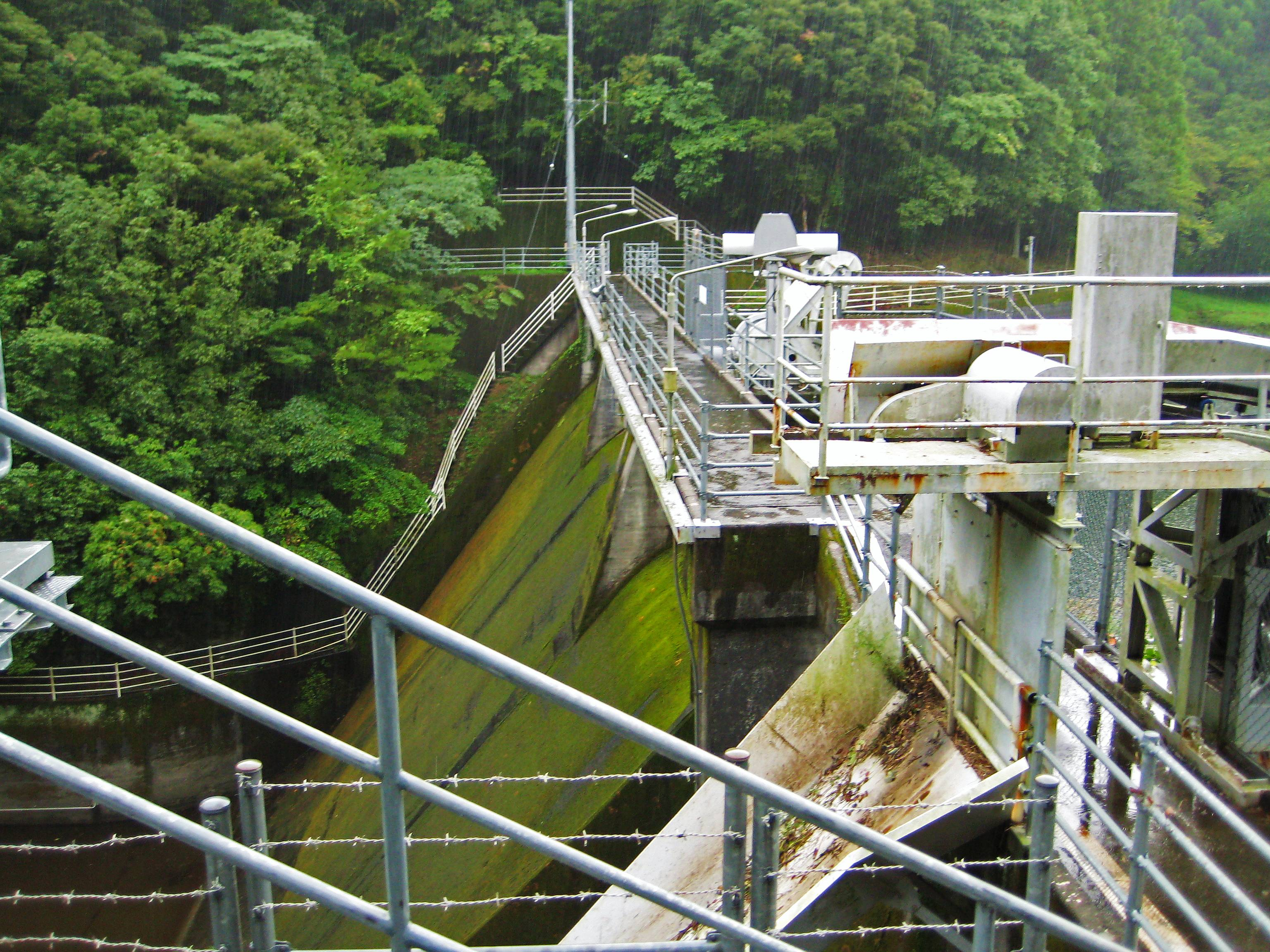
- Interactive map of Yasuba Dam
- Location: Kōchi Prefecture, Japan

Yasuba Dam (Japanese: 休場ダム) is a dam in Kōchi Prefecture, Japan, completed in 1963.
