= Kuki Dam =

Coordinates: 33°34′48″N 134°6′30.1″E

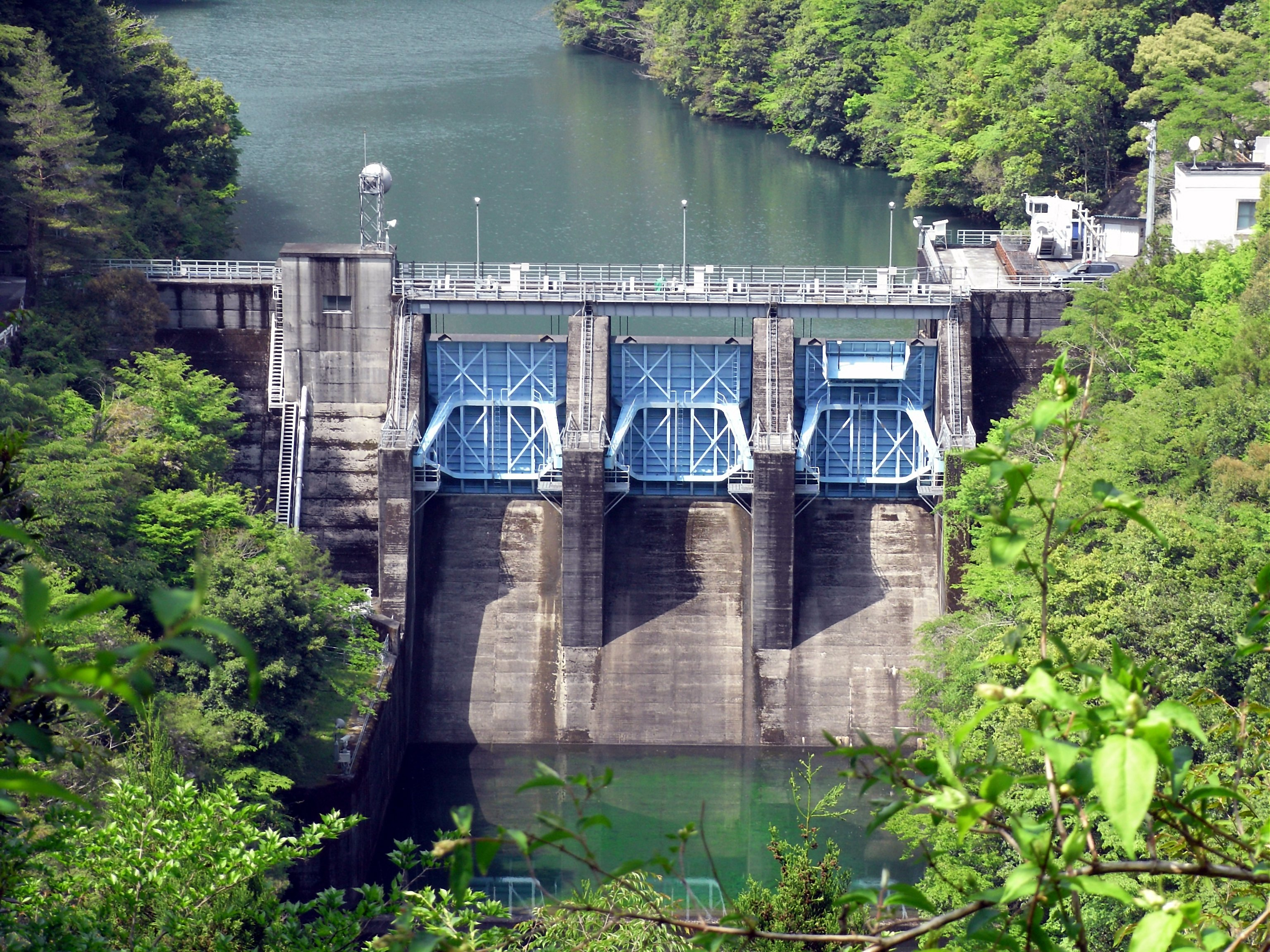
- Interactive map of Kuki Dam
- Location: Kitagawa, Kōchi, Japan
- Opening date: 1963

Dam and spillways
- Type of dam: Concrete gravity dam
- Impounds: Nahari River
- Height: 28 m (92 ft)
- Length: 94.5 m (310 ft)
- Dam volume: 28,000 m^{3}

Reservoir
- Total capacity: 2,940,000 m^{3}
- Catchment area: 147 km^{2}
- Surface area: 29 ha

Kuki Dam (久木ダム, Kuki damu) is a dam in Kitagawa, Kōchi Prefecture, Japan, completed in 1963. It is located on the Nahari River immediately downstream from the Yanase Dam and further upstream from the Hiranabe Dam.
