= Yoshino Dam =

Dam in Kochi Prefecture, Japan

- Location within Japan
- Official name: 吉野ダム
- Location: Kochi Prefecture, Japan
- Coordinates: 33°39′41″N 133°48′46″E
- Construction began: 1951
- Opening date: 1953

Dam and spillways
- Height: 26.9 m (88 ft)
- Length: 115.5 m (379 ft)

Reservoir
- Total capacity: 2,091,000 m^{3} (73,800,000 cu ft)
- Catchment area: 343.4 km^{2} (132.6 sq mi)
- Surface area: 32 hectares (79 acres)

Yoshino Dam (Japanese: 吉野ダム) is a gravity dam located in Kochi Prefecture, on the island of Shikoku in Japan. The dam is used for power production. The catchment area of the dam is 343.4 km^{2}. The dam impounds about 32 ha of land when full and can store 2091 thousand cubic meters of water. The construction of the dam was started on 1951 and completed in 1953.

== See also ==
- List of dams in Japan
