= Hatsuse Dam =

Dam in Kochi Prefecture, Japan

- Location within Japan
- Interactive map of Hatsuse Dam
- Official name: 初瀬ダム
- Location: Kochi Prefecture, Japan
- Coordinates: 33°20′59″N 132°57′12″E
- Construction began: 1935
- Opening date: 1937

Dam and spillways
- Height: 23 m (75 ft)
- Length: 112.5 m (369 ft)

Reservoir
- Total capacity: 1454 thousand cubic meters
- Catchment area: 171.2 sq. km
- Surface area: 21 hectares

Hatsuse Dam (Japanese: 初瀬ダム) is a gravity dam located in Kochi Prefecture in Japan. The dam is used for power production. The catchment area of the dam is 171.2 km^{2}. The dam impounds about 21 ha of land when full and can store 1454 thousand cubic meters of water. The construction of the dam was started on 1935 and completed in 1937.

== See also ==
- List of dams in Japan
