= Hiranabe Dam =

Coordinates: 33°30′26″N 134°7′2.8″E

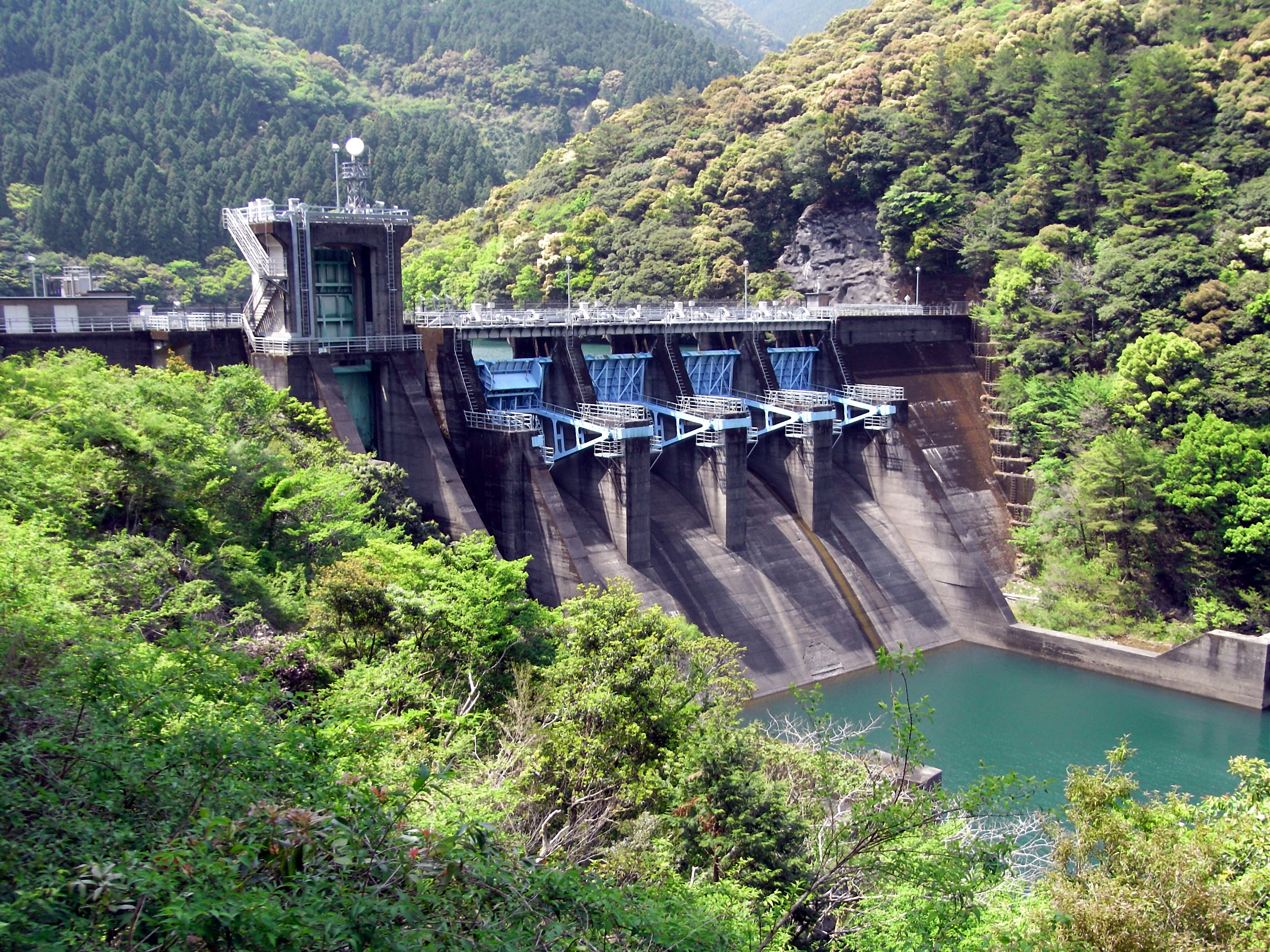
- Interactive map of Hiranabe Dam
- Location: Kitagawa, Kōchi, Japan
- Opening date: 1960

Dam and spillways
- Type of dam: Concrete gravity dam
- Impounds: Nahari River
- Height: 38 m (125 ft)
- Length: 124 m (407 ft)
- Dam volume: 60,000 m^{3}

Reservoir
- Total capacity: 4,240,000 m^{3}
- Catchment area: 233.4 km^{2}
- Surface area: 35 ha

Hiranabe Dam (平鍋ダム, Hiranabe damu) is a dam in Kitagawa, Kōchi Prefecture, Japan. It is located on the Nahari River downstream from Yanase Dam and Kuki Dam.
