= Suita Dam =

Dam in Kochi Prefecture, Japan

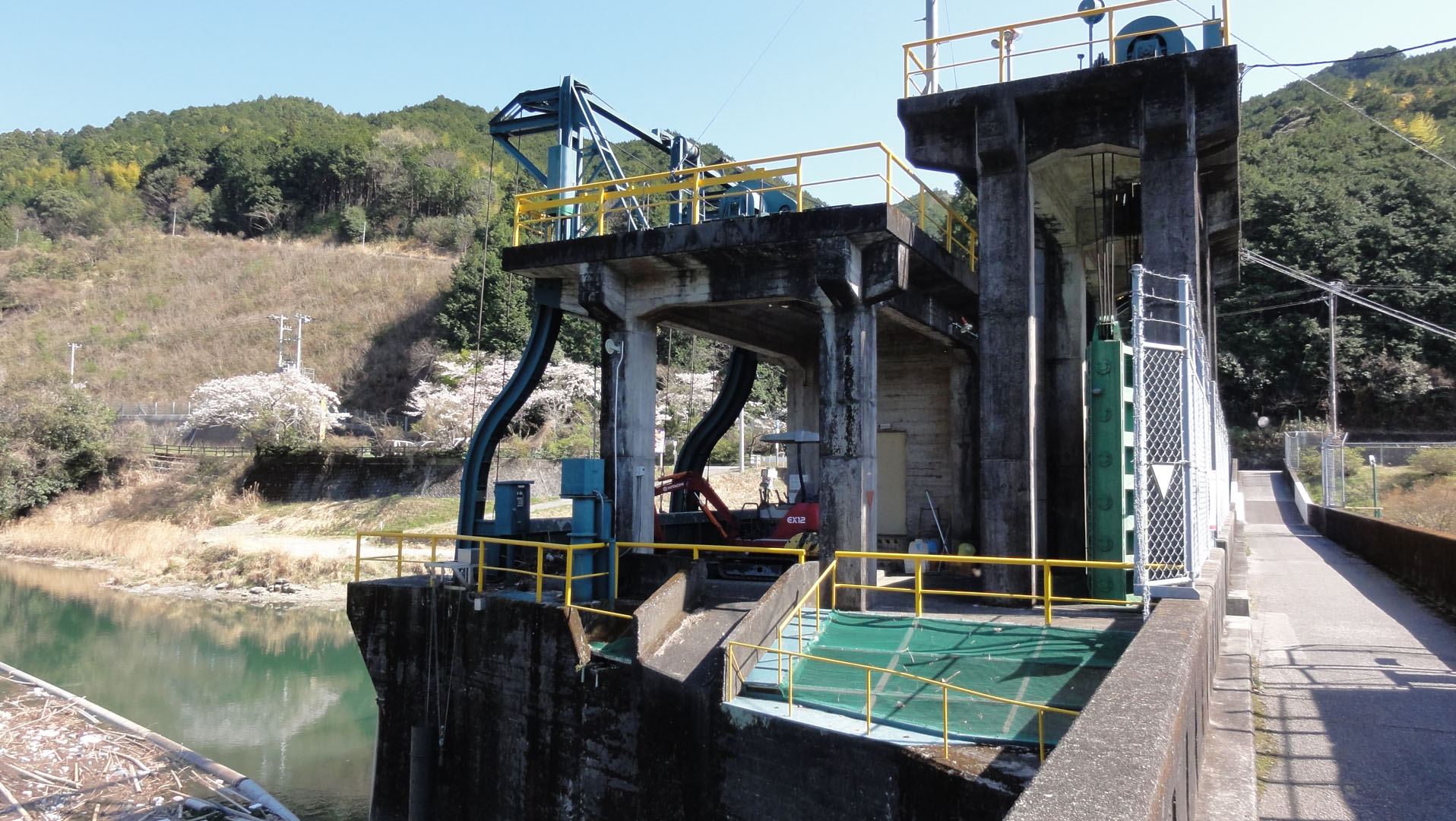

- Location within Japan
- Official name: 杉田ダム
- Location: Kochi Prefecture, Japan
- Coordinates: 33°38′17″N 133°43′49″E
- Construction began: 1952
- Opening date: 1959

Dam and spillways
- Height: 44 m (144 ft)
- Length: 140.5 m (461 ft)

Reservoir
- Total capacity: 10,532,000 m^{3} (371,900,000 cu ft)
- Catchment area: 440 km^{2} (170 sq mi)
- Surface area: 94 hectares (230 acres)

Suita Dam (Japanese: 杉田ダム) is a gravity dam located in Kochi Prefecture in Japan. The dam is used for power production. The catchment area of the dam is 440 km^{2}. The dam impounds about 94 ha of land when full and can store 10532 thousand cubic meters of water. The construction of the dam was started on 1952 and completed in 1959.

== See also ==
- List of dams in Japan
