= Haruto Dam =

Dam in Kochi Prefecture, Japan

- Location within Japan
- Interactive map of Haruto Dam
- Official name: 春遠第一ダム
- Location: Kochi Prefecture, Japan
- Coordinates: 32°49′39″N 132°44′30″E
- Construction began: 1994

Dam and spillways
- Height: 31 m (102 ft)
- Length: 112 m (367 ft)

Reservoir
- Total capacity: 630 thousand cubic meters
- Catchment area: 0.8 sq. km
- Surface area: 10 hectares

Haruto Dam (Japanese: 春遠第一ダム) is a gravity dam located in Kochi Prefecture in Japan. The dam is used for flood control and water supply. The catchment area of the dam is 0.8 km^{2}. The dam impounds about 10 ha of land when full and can store 630 thousand cubic meters of water. The construction of the dam was started on 1994.

== See also ==
- List of dams in Japan
