= Kirimi Dam =

Dam in Kochi Prefecture, Japan

- Location within Japan
- Official name: 桐見ダム
- Location: Kochi Prefecture, Japan
- Coordinates: 33°31′24″N 133°12′51″E
- Construction began: 1969
- Opening date: 1988

Dam and spillways
- Height: 69 m (226 ft)
- Length: 156 m (512 ft)

Reservoir
- Total capacity: 8160 thousand cubic meters
- Catchment area: 49.1 sq. km
- Surface area: 40 hectares

Kirimi Dam (Japanese: 桐見ダム) is a gravity dam located in Kochi Prefecture in Japan. The dam is used for flood control. The catchment area of the dam is 49.1 km^{2}. The dam impounds about 40 ha of land when full and can store 8160 thousand cubic meters of water. The construction of the dam was started on 1969 and completed in 1988.

== See also ==
- List of dams in Japan
