= Himenoi-ike Dam =

Dam in Kochi Prefecture, Japan

- Location within Japan
- Interactive map of Himenoi-ike Dam
- Official name: 宮ノ越ダム
- Location: Kochi Prefecture, Japan
- Coordinates: 32°48′46″N 132°44′29″E
- Opening date: 1960

Dam and spillways
- Height: 20 m (66 ft)
- Length: 86.2 m (283 ft)

Reservoir
- Total capacity: 171 thousand cubic meters
- Surface area: 2.97 hectares

Himenoi-ike Dam (Japanese: 宮ノ越ダム) is an earthfill dam located in Kochi Prefecture in Japan. The dam is used for irrigation. The dam impounds about 2.97 ha of land when full and can store 171 thousand cubic meters of water. The construction of the dam was completed in 1960.

== See also ==
- List of dams in Japan
