= Nagashima Dam Station =

Railway station in Kawanehon, Shizuoka Prefecture, Japan

Nagashima Dam Station 長島ダム駅
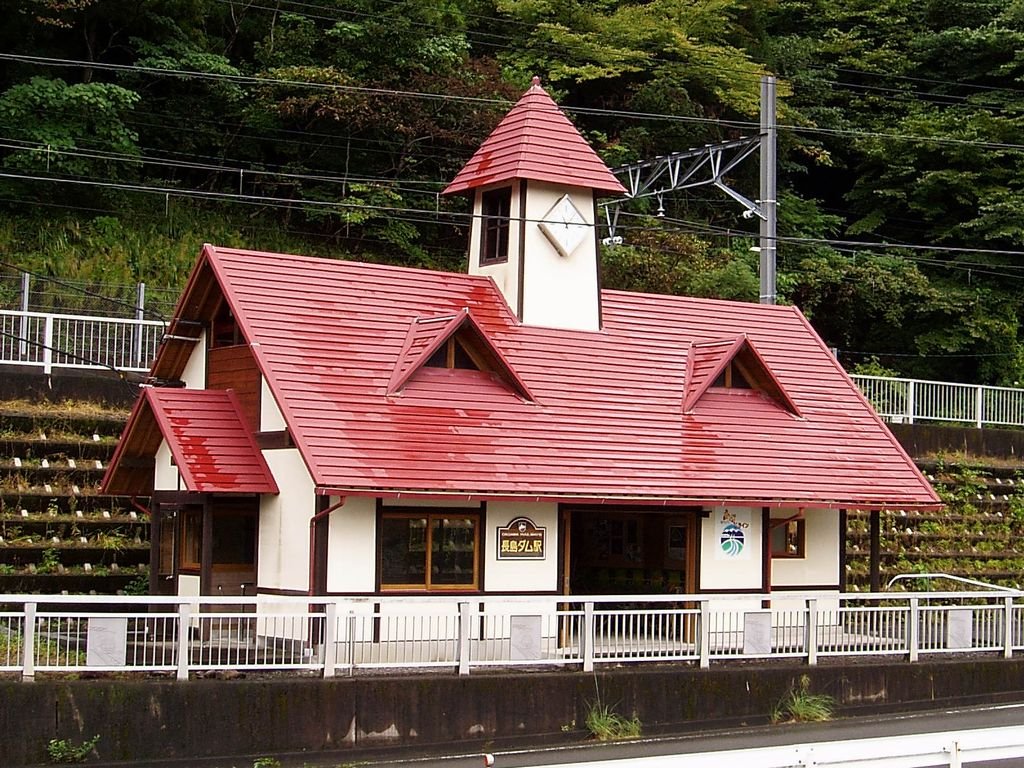
- Nagashima Dam Station in July 2009

General information
- Location: Inuma, Kawanehon-cho, Haibara-gun, Shizuoka-ken; Japan
- Coordinates: 35°10′8.03″N 138°9′25.63″E
- Elevation: 485 m (1,591 ft)
- Operator: Ōigawa Railway
- Line: ■ Ikawa Line
- Distance: 11.4 kilometers from Senzu
- Platforms: 2 side platforms

Other information
- Status: Unstaffed

History
- Opened: October 2, 1990

Passengers
- FY2017: 7 daily
Location
- Location within Shizuoka Prefecture Location within Japan

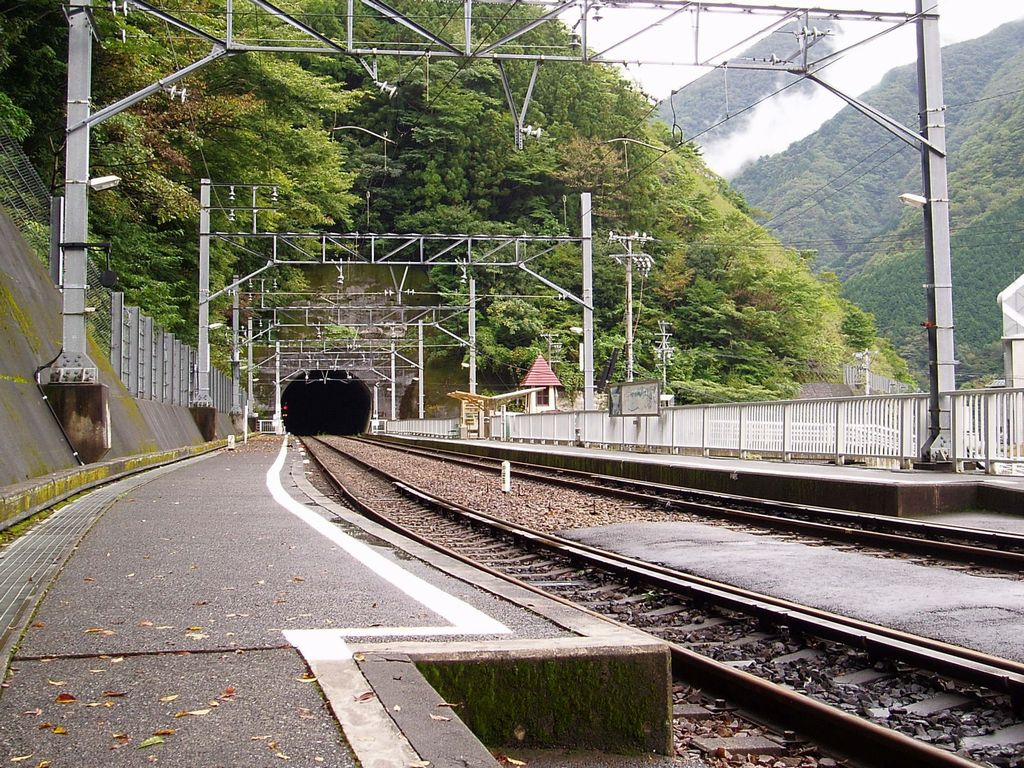
Nagashima Dam Station

Nagashima Dam Station (長島ダム駅, Nagashima Damu-eki) is a railway station in the town of Kawanehon, Haibara District, Shizuoka Prefecture, Japan, operated by the Ōigawa Railway. In between Abt Ichishiro Station and Nagashima Dam Station, the gradient is very steep and an Abt rack system is used.

== Lines ==
Nagashima Dam Station is served by the Ikawa Line, and is located 11.4 kilometers from the official starting point of the line at Senzu.

== Station layout ==
The station has two opposed side platforms serving two tracks, connected to a small red-roofed station building by a level crossing. The station is unattended.

== Adjacent stations ==
«	Service	»
Ōigawa Railway
Ikawa Line
Abt Ichishiro	-	Hiranda

== Station history ==
Nagashima Dam Station was opened on October 2, 1990, when part of the Ikawa Line was re-routed to avoid the rising waters of the lake created by the Nagashima Dam.

== Passenger statistics ==
In fiscal 2017, the station was used by an average of 7 passengers daily (boarding passengers only).

== Surrounding area ==
- Nagashima Dam

== See also ==
- List of railway stations in Japan
