= Yokozegawa Dam =

Dam in Kochi Prefecture, Japan

- Location within Japan
- Official name: 横瀬川ダム
- Location: Kochi Prefecture, Japan
- Coordinates: 33°0′47″N 132°48′55″E
- Construction began: 1982
- Opening date: 2019

Dam and spillways
- Height: 72.1 m (237 ft)
- Length: 188.5 m (618 ft)

Reservoir
- Total capacity: 7,300,000 m^{3} (260,000,000 cu ft)
- Catchment area: 11.4 km^{2} (4.4 sq mi)
- Surface area: 40 hectares (99 acres)

Yokozegawa Dam (Japanese: 横瀬川ダム) is a gravity dam located in Kochi Prefecture in Japan. The dam is used for flood control and water supply. The catchment area of the dam is 11.4 km^{2}. The dam impounds about 40 ha of land when full and can store 7300 thousand cubic meters of water. The construction of the dam was started on 1982 and completed in 2019.

== See also ==
- List of dams in Japan
