= Asemi Dam =

Dam in Kochi Prefecture, Japan

- Location within Japan
- Interactive map of Asemi Dam
- Official name: 汗見ダム
- Location: Kochi Prefecture, Japan
- Coordinates: 33°47′59″N 133°33′14″E
- Opening date: 1972

Dam and spillways
- Height: 18.5 m (61 ft)
- Length: 63.5 m (208 ft)

Reservoir
- Total capacity: 79 thousand cubic meters
- Catchment area: 51 sq. km
- Surface area: 2 hectares

Asemi Dam (Japanese: 汗見ダム) is a gravity dam located in Kochi Prefecture in Japan. The dam is used for power production. The catchment area of the dam is 51 km^{2}. The dam impounds about 2 ha of land when full and can store 79 thousand cubic meters of water. The construction of the dam was completed in 1972.

== See also ==
- List of dams in Japan
