= Iokigawa Dam =

Dam in Kochi Prefecture, Japan

- Location within Japan
- Interactive map of Iokigawa Dam
- Official name: 伊尾木川ダム
- Location: Kochi Prefecture, Japan
- Coordinates: 33°36′20″N 133°58′41″E
- Construction began: 1952
- Opening date: 1954

Dam and spillways
- Height: 22.8 m (75 ft)
- Length: 57 m (187 ft)

Reservoir
- Total capacity: 887 thousand cubic meters
- Catchment area: 86.1 sq. km
- Surface area: 11 hectares

Iokigawa Dam (Japanese: 伊尾木川ダム) is a gravity dam located in Kochi Prefecture in Japan. The dam is used for power production. The catchment area of the dam is 86.1 km^{2}. The dam impounds about 11 ha of land when full and can store 887 thousand cubic meters of water. The construction of the dam was started on 1952 and completed in 1954.

== See also ==
- List of dams in Japan
