= Iburikawa Dam =

Dam in Kochi Prefecture, Japan

- Location within Japan
- Interactive map of Iburikawa Dam
- Official name: 以布利川ダム
- Location: Kochi Prefecture, Japan
- Coordinates: 32°48′02″N 132°57′01″E
- Construction began: 1989
- Opening date: 2005

Dam and spillways
- Height: 30.5 m (100 ft)
- Length: 93 m (305 ft)

Reservoir
- Total capacity: 352 thousand cubic meters
- Catchment area: 0.7 sq. km
- Surface area: 4 hectares

Iburikawa Dam (Japanese: 以布利川ダム) is a gravity dam located in Kochi Prefecture in Japan. The dam is used for flood control and water supply. The catchment area of the dam is 0.7 km^{2}. The dam impounds about 4 ha of land when full and can store 352 thousand cubic meters of water. The construction of the dam was started on 1989 and completed in 2005.

== See also ==
- List of dams in Japan
