= Yanase Dam =

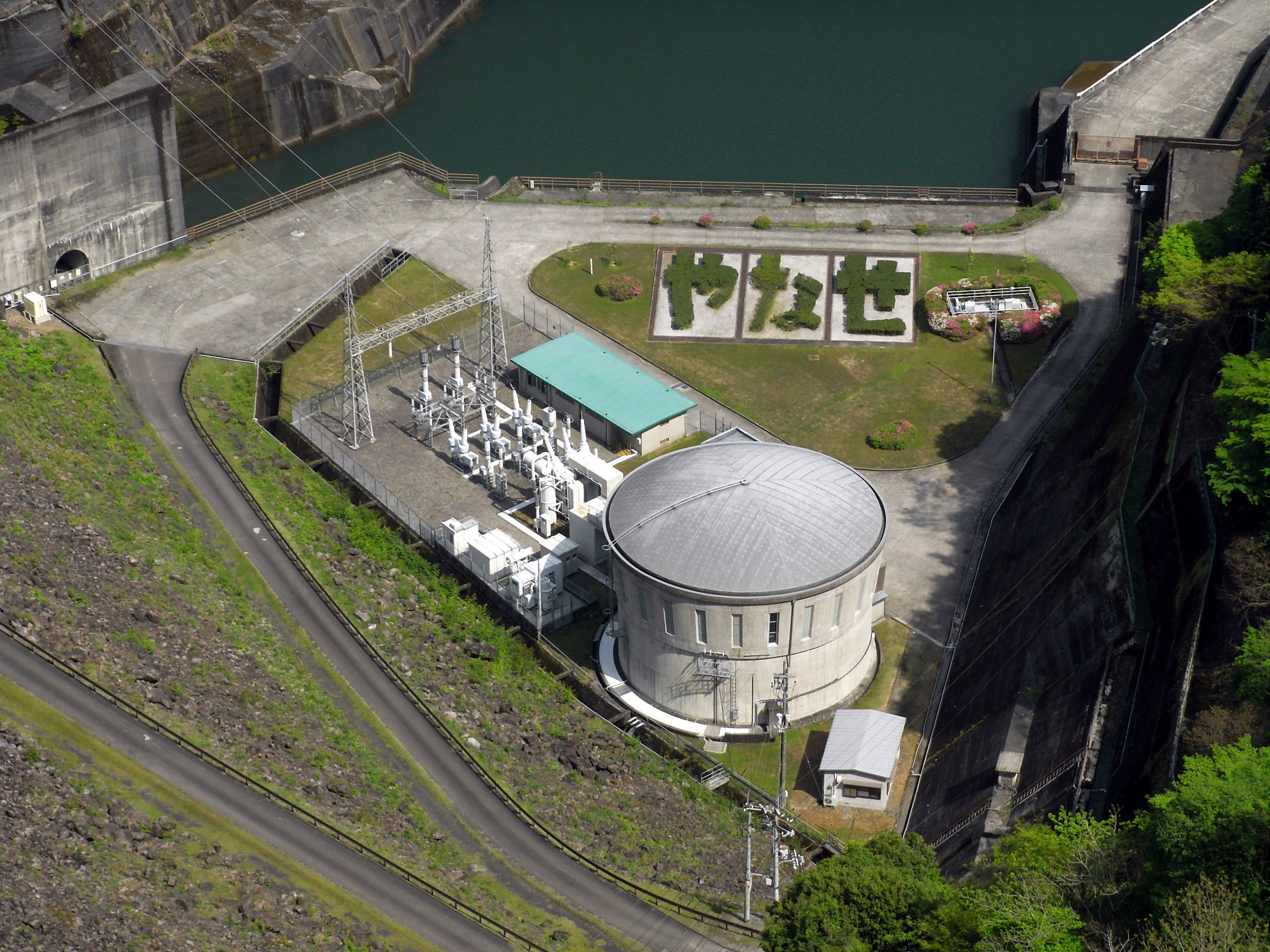
- Interactive map of Yanase Dam
- Location: Kitagawa, Kōchi, Japan
- Coordinates: 33°35′35″N 134°6′44.5″E
- Construction began: 1962
- Opening date: 1970

Dam and spillways
- Type of dam: Rock-fill dam
- Impounds: Nahari River
- Height: 115 m (377 ft)
- Length: 202 m (663 ft)
- Dam volume: 2,800,000 m^{3}

Reservoir
- Creates: Yanase Chosuichi Reservoir
- Total capacity: 104,625,000 m^{3}
- Catchment area: 117.1 km^{2}
- Surface area: 291 ha

Yanase dam (魚梁瀬ダム, Yanase damu) is a dam in Kitagawa, Kōchi Prefecture, Japan, completed in 1970. It is located on the Nahari River immediately upstream from the Kuki Dam and further upstream from the Hiranabe Dam.
