= Sakamoto Dam (Kōchi) =

Dam in Kochi Prefecture, Japan

- Location within Japan
- Official name: 坂本ダム
- Location: Kochi Prefecture, Japan
- Coordinates: 33°1′38″N 132°43′31″E
- Construction began: 1972
- Opening date: 2000

Dam and spillways
- Height: 60.3 m (198 ft)
- Length: 193.5 m (635 ft)

Reservoir
- Total capacity: 18,150,000 m^{3} (641,000,000 cu ft)
- Catchment area: 82 km^{2} (32 sq mi)
- Surface area: 99 hectares (240 acres)

Sakamoto Dam (Japanese: 坂本ダム) is a gravity dam located in Kochi Prefecture in Japan. The dam is used for flood control and power production. The catchment area of the dam is 82 km^{2}. The dam impounds about 99 ha of land when full and can store 18150 thousand cubic meters of water. The construction of the dam was started on 1972 and completed in 2000.

== See also ==
- List of dams in Japan
