= Ushinoikeda Dam =

Dam in Kochi Prefecture, Japan

- Location within Japan
- Official name: 牛の池田ダム
- Location: Kochi Prefecture, Japan
- Coordinates: 32°49′50″N 132°41′13″E
- Opening date: 1965

Dam and spillways
- Height: 20 m (66 ft)
- Length: 115 m (377 ft)

Reservoir
- Total capacity: 141,000 m^{3} (5,000,000 cu ft)
- Surface area: 2.1 hectares (5.2 acres)

Ushinoikeda Dam (Japanese: 牛の池田ダム) is an earthfill dam located in Kochi Prefecture in Japan. The dam is used for irrigation. The dam impounds about 2.1 ha of land when full and can store 141 thousand cubic meters of water. The construction of the dam was completed in 1965.

== See also ==
- List of dams in Japan
