= Futo-ike Dam =

Dam in Kochi Prefecture, Japan

- Location within Japan
- Interactive map of Futo-ike Dam
- Official name: 普当池
- Location: Kochi Prefecture, Japan
- Coordinates: 33°31′13″N 133°50′54″E
- Opening date: 1956

Dam and spillways
- Height: 15.5 m (51 ft)
- Length: 55 m (180 ft)

Reservoir
- Total capacity: 20 thousand cubic meters
- Surface area: 1 hectares

Futo-ike Dam (Japanese: 普当池) is a rockfill dam located in Kochi Prefecture in Japan. The dam is used for irrigation. The dam impounds about 1 ha of land when full and can store 20 thousand cubic meters of water. The construction of the dam was completed in 1956.

== See also ==
- List of dams in Japan
