= Okuide Dam =

Dam in Kochi Prefecture, Japan

- Location within Japan
- Official name: 奥出ダム
- Location: Kochi Prefecture, Japan
- Coordinates: 33°32′42″N 133°48′59″E
- Construction began: 1984
- Opening date: 1991

Dam and spillways
- Height: 18.7 m (61 ft)
- Length: 62 m (203 ft)

Reservoir
- Total capacity: 120,000 m^{3} (4,200,000 cu ft)
- Catchment area: 2.6 km^{2} (1.0 sq mi)
- Surface area: 2 hectares (4.9 acres)

Okuide Dam (Japanese: 奥出ダム) is a gravity dam located in Kochi Prefecture in Japan. The dam is used for irrigation. The catchment area of the dam is 2.6 km^{2}. The dam impounds about 2 ha of land when full and can store 120 thousand cubic meters of water. The construction of the dam was started on 1984 and completed in 1991.

== See also ==
- List of dams in Japan
