= Bunsui Dam =

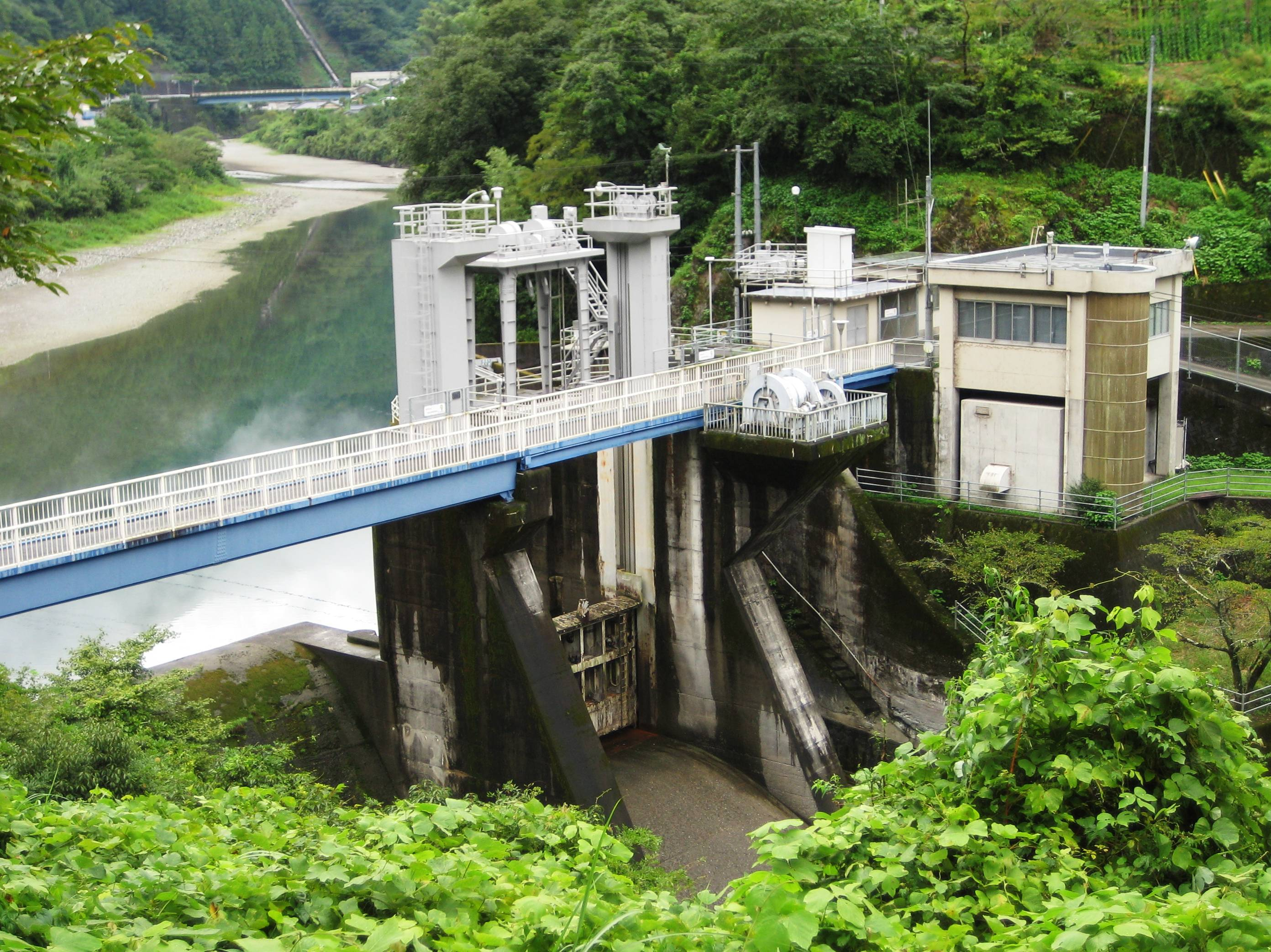
- Interactive map of Bunsui Dam
- Country: Japan
- Location: Ino, Kōchi, Japan
- Coordinates: 33°41′51″N 133°20′21″E
- Construction began: 1986
- Opening date: 2005

Bunsui Dam (分水ダム) is a dam in Ino, Kōchi Prefecture, Japan.
