= Jiruzo-ike Dam =

Dam in Kochi Prefecture, Japan

Jiruzo-ike
- Location within Japan
- Interactive map of Jiruzo-ike
- Official name: ジル蔵池
- Location: Kochi Prefecture, Japan
- Coordinates: 33°32′50″N 133°50′21″E
- Construction began: 1953
- Opening date: 1955

Dam and spillways
- Height: 21.5 m (71 ft)
- Length: 60 m (200 ft)

Reservoir
- Total capacity: 170 thousand cubic meters
- Catchment area: 0.1 sq. km
- Surface area: 2 hectares

Jiruzo-ike (Japanese: ジル蔵池) is an earthfill dam located in Kochi Prefecture in Japan. The dam is used for irrigation. The catchment area of the dam is 0.1 km^{2}. The dam impounds about 2 ha of land when full and can store 170 thousand cubic meters of water. The construction of the dam was started on 1953 and completed in 1955.

== See also ==
- List of dams in Japan
