= Kamaidani Dam =

Dam in Kochi Prefecture, Japan

- Location within Japan
- Interactive map of Kamaidani Dam
- Official name: 鎌井谷ダム
- Location: Kochi Prefecture, Japan
- Coordinates: 33°35′09″N 133°44′09″E
- Construction began: 1988
- Opening date: 1997

Dam and spillways
- Height: 27.3 m (90 ft)
- Length: 131 m (430 ft)

Reservoir
- Total capacity: 136 thousand cubic meters
- Catchment area: 0.3 sq. km
- Surface area: 2 hectares

Kamaidani Dam (Japanese: 鎌井谷ダム) is a gravity dam located in Kochi Prefecture in Japan. The dam is used for flood control and irrigation. The catchment area of the dam is 0.3 km^{2}. The dam impounds about 2 ha of land when full and can store 136 thousand cubic meters of water. The construction of the dam was started on 1988 and completed in 1997.

== See also ==
- List of dams in Japan
