= Nishiyama Dam (Kōchi) =

Dam in Kochi Prefecture, Japan

- Location within Japan
- Official name: 西山ダム
- Location: Kochi Prefecture, Japan
- Coordinates: 33°21′54″N 134°5′13″E
- Construction began: 1982
- Opening date: 1997

Dam and spillways
- Height: 27.2 m (89 ft)
- Length: 74.7 m (245 ft)

Reservoir
- Total capacity: 56,000 m^{3} (2,000,000 cu ft)
- Catchment area: 0.2 km^{2} (0.077 sq mi)
- Surface area: 1 hectare (2.5 acres)

Nishiyama Dam (Japanese: 西山ダム) is an earthfill dam located in Kochi Prefecture in Japan. The dam is used for irrigation. The catchment area of the dam is 0.2 km^{2}. The dam impounds about 1 ha of land when full and can store 56 thousand cubic meters of water. The construction of the dam was started on 1982 and completed in 1997.

== See also ==
- List of dams in Japan
