= Maruzuka-ike Dam =

Dam in Kochi Prefecture, Japan

- Location within Japan
- Official name: 丸塚池
- Location: Kochi Prefecture, Japan
- Coordinates: 33°33′01″N 133°49′40″E
- Opening date: 1965

Dam and spillways
- Height: 28.2 m (93 ft)
- Length: 70 m (230 ft)

Reservoir
- Total capacity: 305 thousand cubic meters
- Catchment area: 17.6 sq. km
- Surface area: 4 hectares

Maruzuka-ike Dam (Japanese: 丸塚池) is an earthfill dam used for irrigation located in Kochi Prefecture, Japan. The catchment area of the dam is 17.6 km^{2}, and the dam impounds about 4 ha of land when full and can store 305 thousand cubic meters of water. The construction of the dam was completed in 1965.

== See also ==
- List of dams in Japan
