= Ohmorigawa Dam =

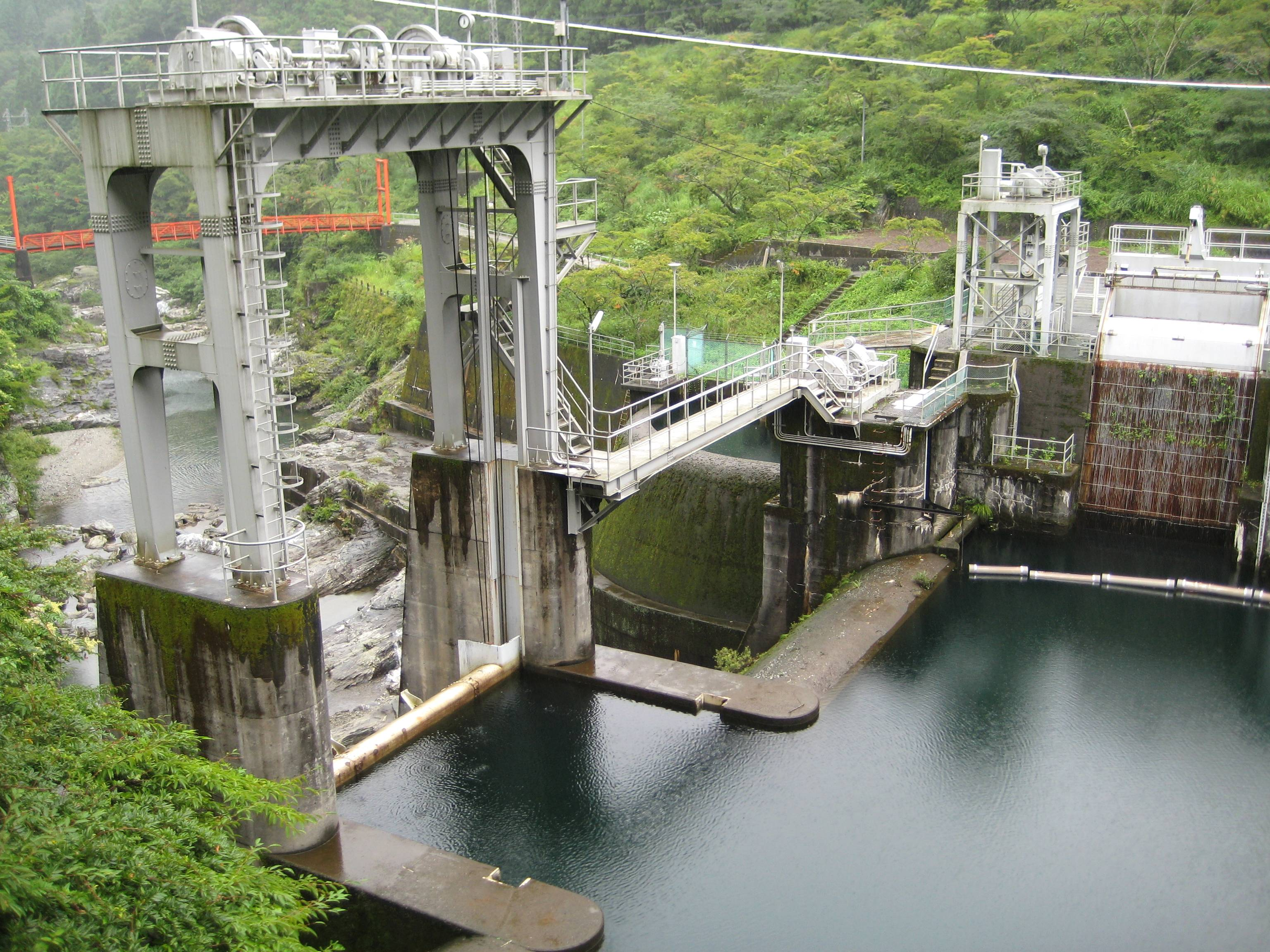
- Interactive map of Ohmorigawa Dam
- Location: Kōchi Prefecture, Japan
- Coordinates: 33°41′41″N 133°15′00″E

Ohmorigawa Dam (Japanese: 大森川取水ダム) is a dam in Kōchi Prefecture, Japan, completed in 1959.
