= Nakasujigawa Dam =

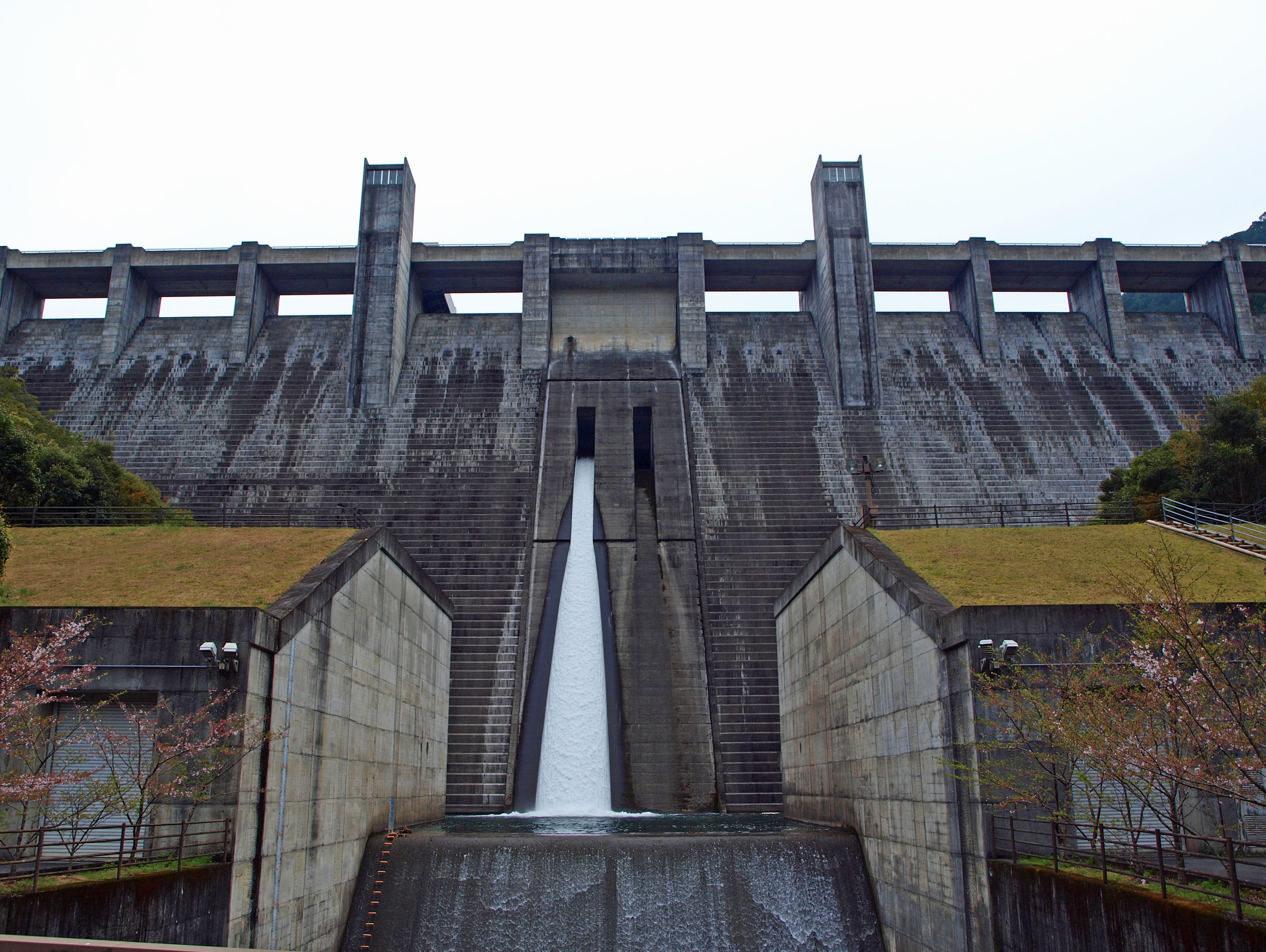
- Interactive map of Nakasujigawa Dam
- Location: Kōchi Prefecture, Japan

Nakasujigawa Dam (Japanese: 中筋川ダム) is a dam in Kōchi Prefecture, Japan, completed in 1998.
