= Shigeto Dam =

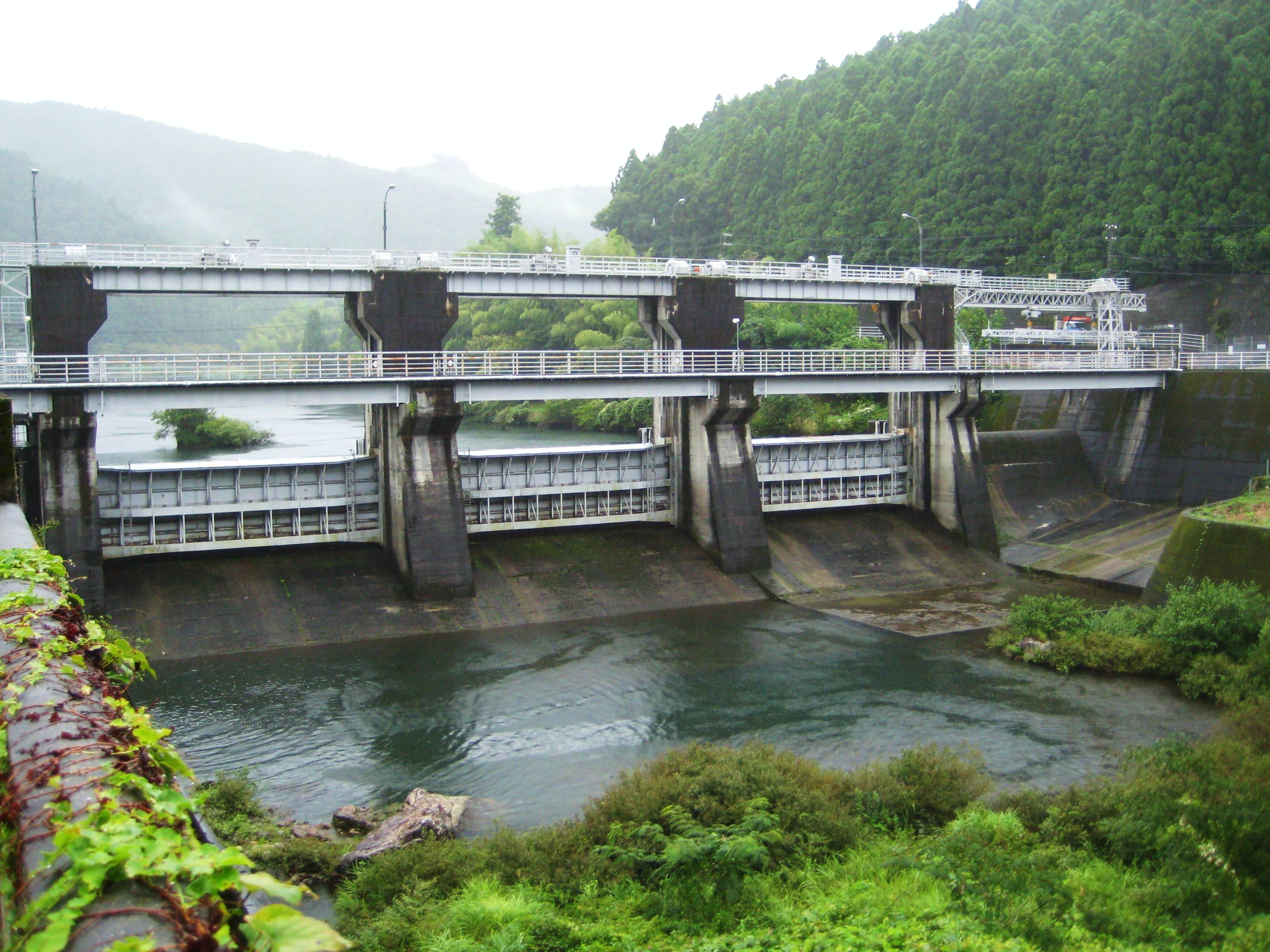
- Location: Kōchi Prefecture, Japan

Shigeto Dam (Japanese: 繁藤ダム) is a dam in Kōchi Prefecture, Japan.
