= Nagase Dam =

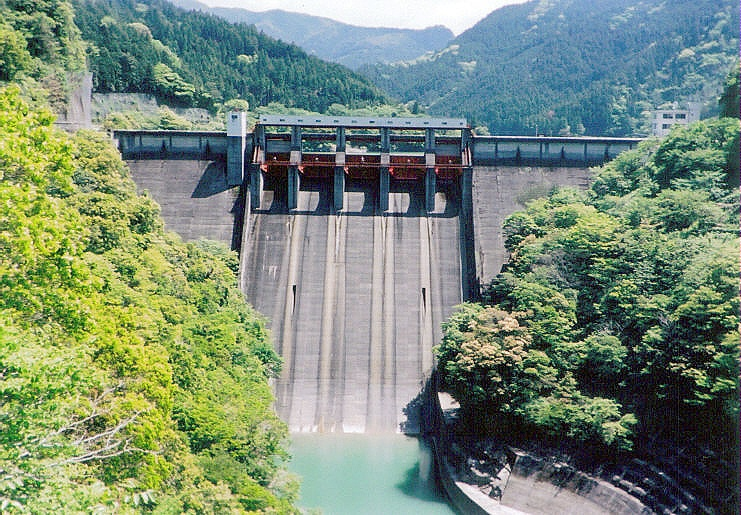
- Interactive map of Nagase Dam
- Official name: 永瀬ダム
- Location: Kōchi Prefecture, Japan
- Coordinates: 33.7057°N 133.8651°E
- Construction began: 1949
- Opening date: 1956

Dam and spillways
- Type of dam: Gravity dam
- Height: 87 m (285 ft)
- Length: 207 m (679 ft)
- Dam volume: 380,000 m^{3}

Reservoir
- Total capacity: 49,090,000 m^{3}
- Catchment area: 295.2 km^{2}
- Surface area: 208 ha

Nagase Dam (Japanese: 永瀬ダム) is a dam in Kōchi Prefecture, Japan, completed in 1956.
