= Ananaigawa Dam =

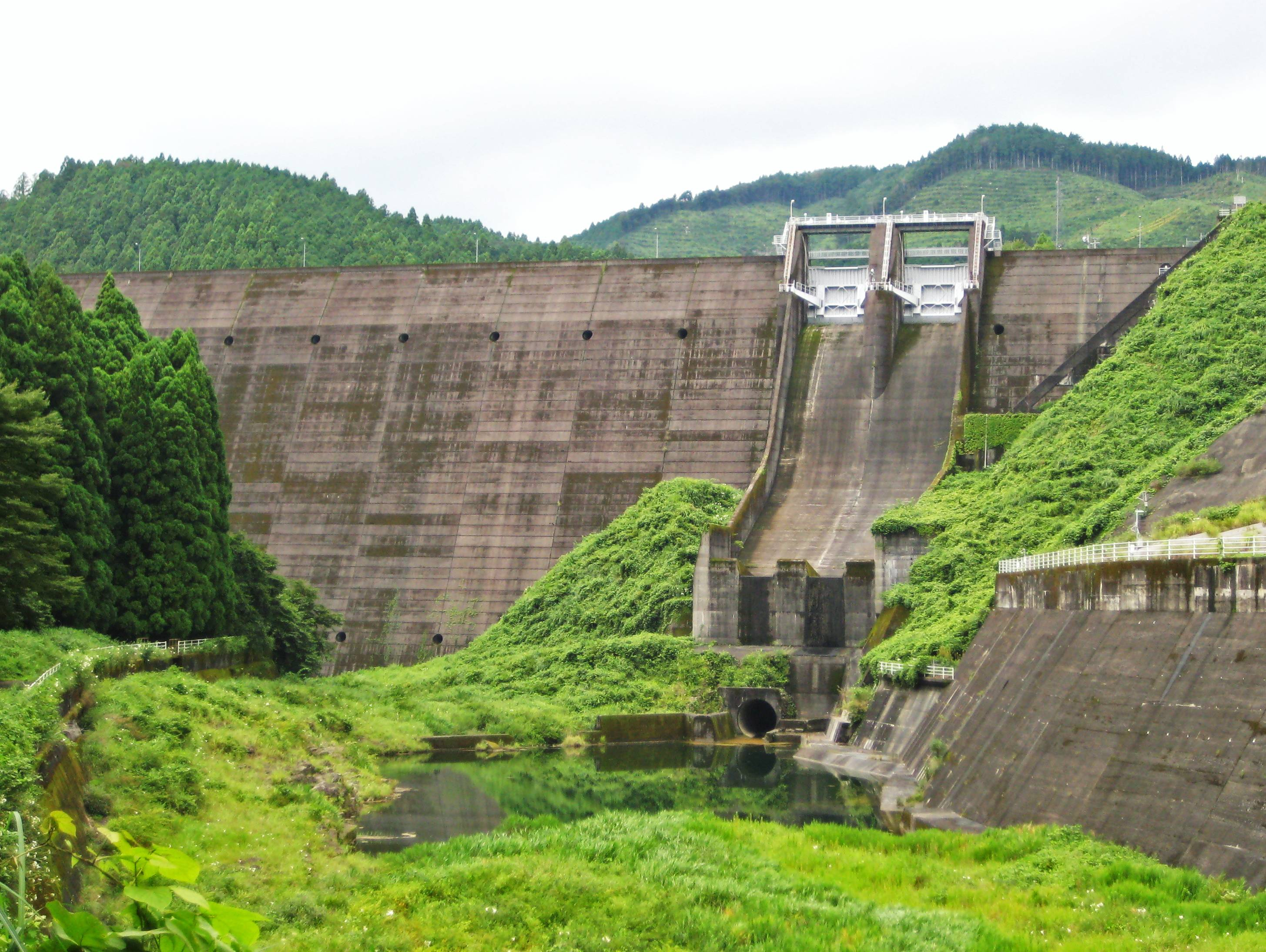
- Interactive map of Ananaigawa Dam
- Location: Kami, Kōchi, Japan
- Coordinates: 33°40′52″N 133°39′19″E

Ananaigawa Dam (穴内川ダム, Ananaigawa Damu) is a dam in Kami, Kōchi Prefecture, Japan, completed in 1963.
