= Sakuraga-ike Dam (Kōchi) =

Dam in Kochi Prefecture, Japan

Sakuraga-ike (shimo) Dam
- Location within Japan
- Official name: 桜ヶ池(下)
- Location: Kochi Prefecture, Japan
- Coordinates: 33°31′45″N 133°49′28″E
- Opening date: 1919

Dam and spillways
- Height: 20 m (66 ft)
- Length: 62 m (203 ft)

Reservoir
- Total capacity: 90,000 m^{3} (3,200,000 cu ft)
- Catchment area: 0.1 km^{2} (0.039 sq mi)
- Surface area: 2 hectares (4.9 acres)

Sakuraga-ike (shimo) Dam (Japanese: 桜ヶ池(下)) is an earthfill dam located in Kochi Prefecture in Japan. The dam is used for irrigation. The catchment area of the dam is 0.1 km^{2}. The dam impounds about 2 ha of land when full and can store 90 thousand cubic meters of water. The construction of the dam was completed in 1919.

== See also ==
- List of dams in Japan
