= Inamura Dam =

Coordinates: 33°44′18″N 133°22′20″E

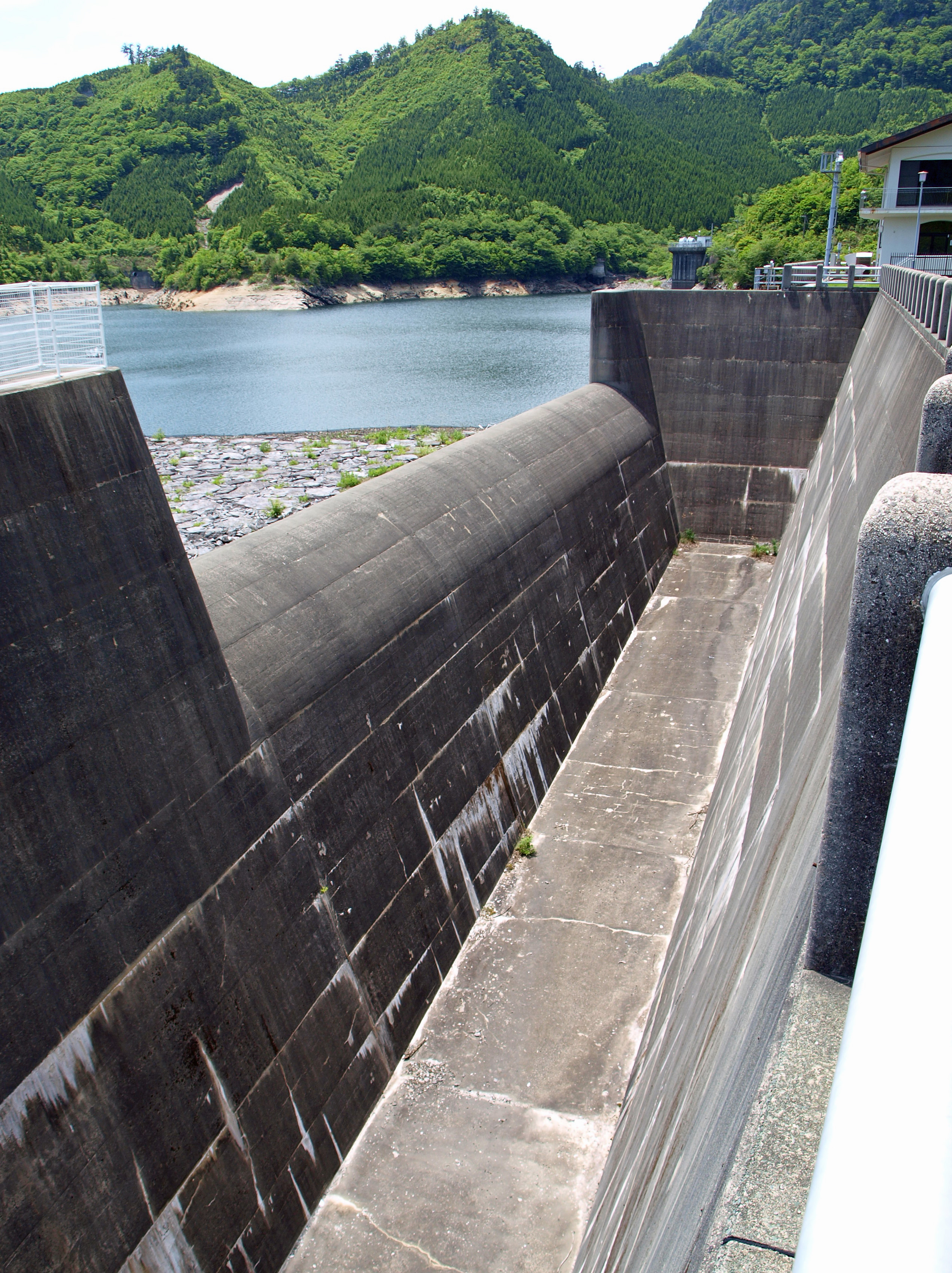
- Interactive map of Inamura Dam
- Location: Tosa, Kōchi, Japan
- Construction began: 1978
- Opening date: 1982

Dam and spillways
- Height: 88 m (289 ft)
- Length: 352 m (1,155 ft)
- Dam volume: 3,100,000 m^{3}

Reservoir
- Total capacity: 5,800,000 m^{3}
- Catchment area: 2.4 km^{2}
- Surface area: 29 ha

Inamura Dam (稲村ダム, Inamura damu) is a dam in Tosa, Kōchi Prefecture, Japan, completed in 1982.
