= Nagasawa Dam =

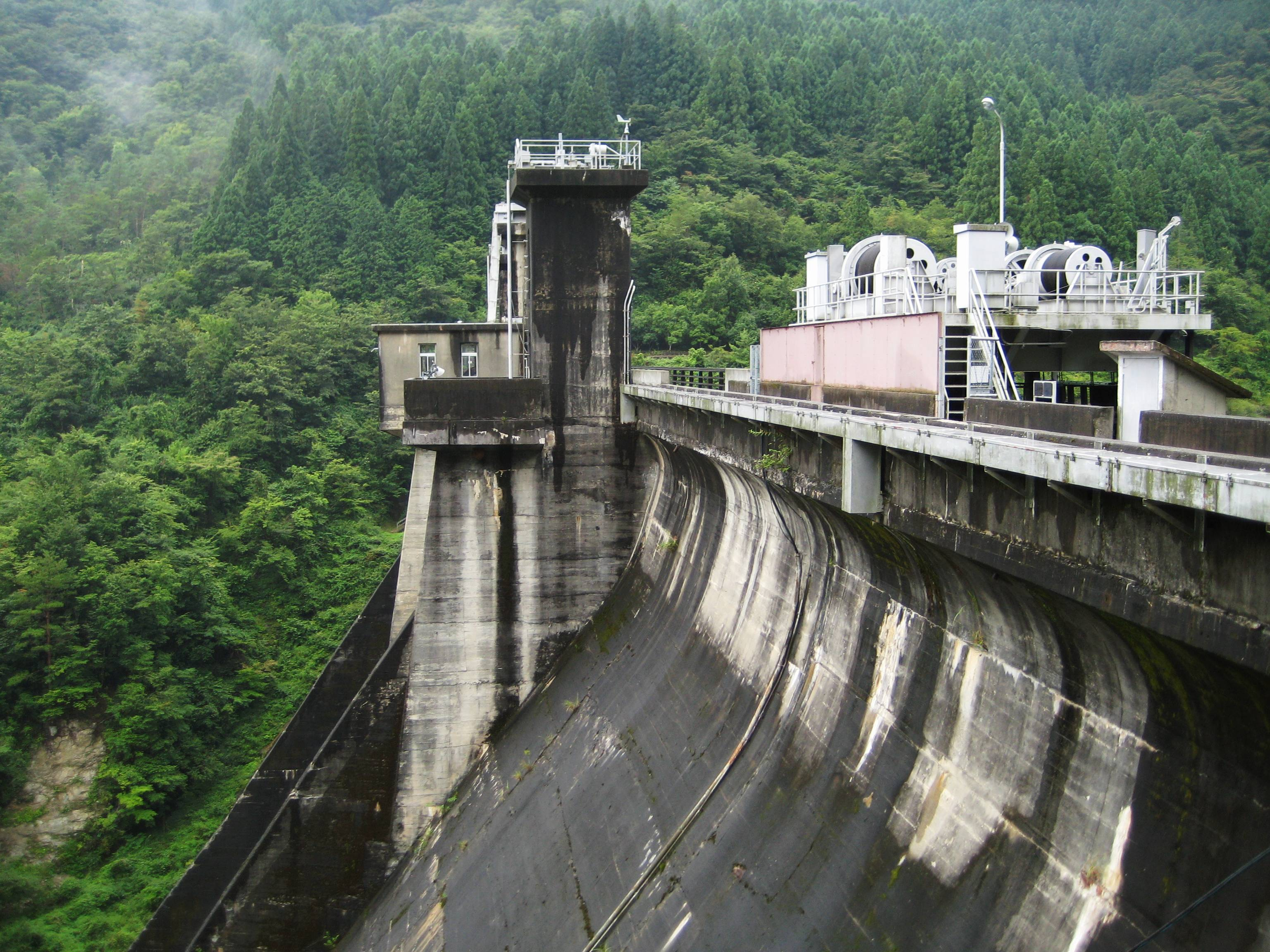
- Interactive map of Nagasawa Dam
- Location: Kōchi Prefecture, Japan
- Coordinates: 33°43′45″N 133°17′04″E

Nagasawa Dam (Japanese: 長沢ダム) is a dam in Kōchi Prefecture, Japan.

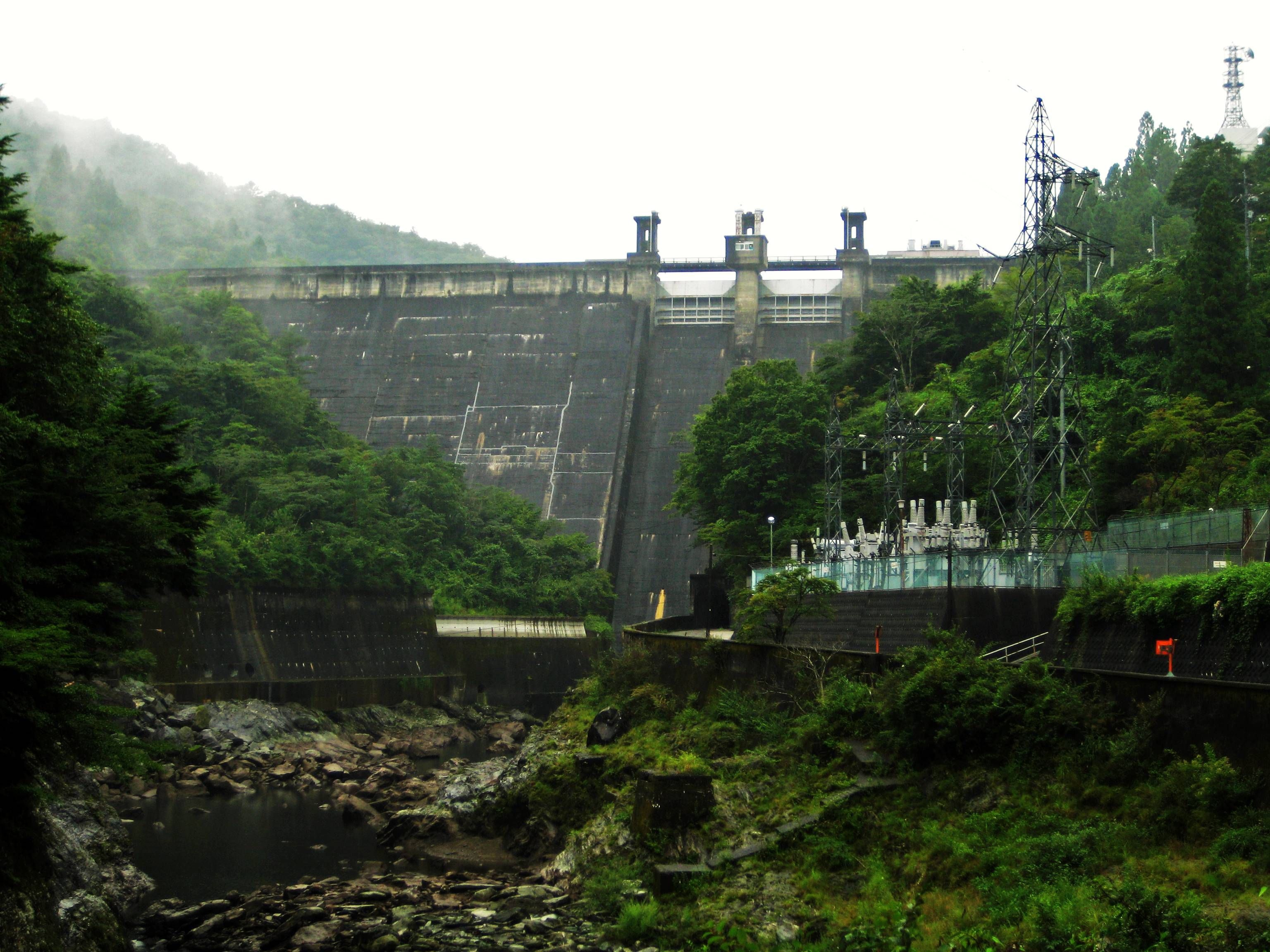
Nagasawa Dam.
