= Tsuga Dam =

Coordinates: 33.2621°N 132.9663°E

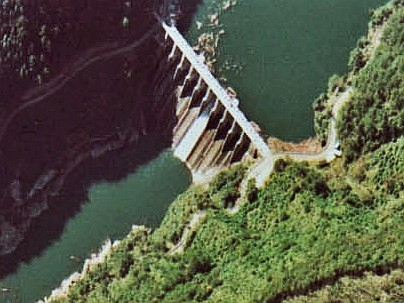
- Interactive map of Tsuga Dam
- Location: Kōchi Prefecture, Japan

Tsuga Dam (Japanese: 津賀ダム) is a dam in Kōchi Prefecture, Japan, completed in 1944.
