= Iejigawa Dam =

Coordinates: 33°9′44.5″N 133°4′15.9″E

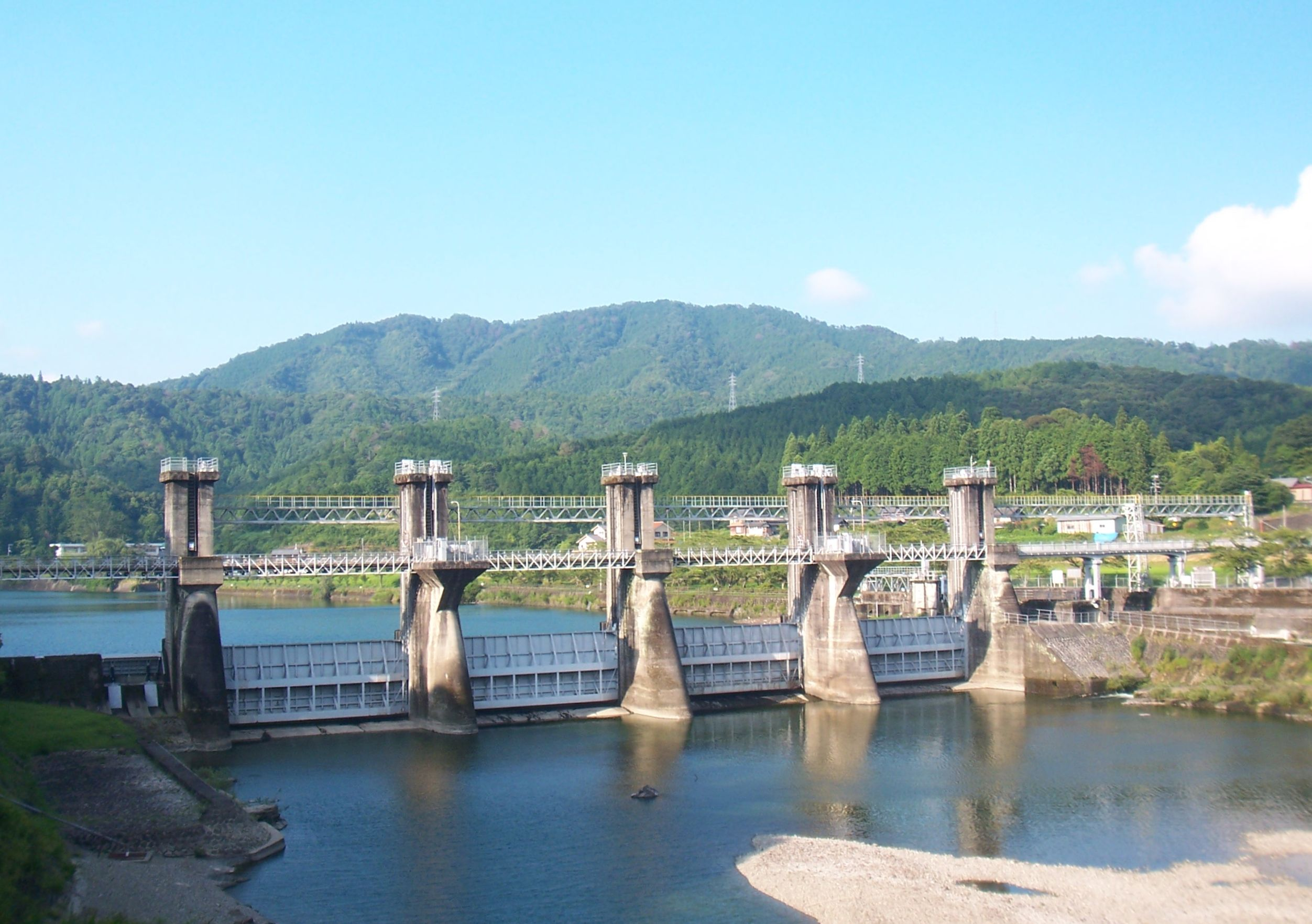
- Interactive map of Iejigawa Dam
- Location: Takaoka, Kōchi, Japan

Iejigawa Dam (家地川ダム, Iejigawa damu) is a dam in Takaoka, Kōchi Prefecture, Japan. The 8 meter dam was completed in December 1937, with a total length of 112.5 meters. Originally designed to provide a source of hydro-electric power to the Kochi Prefecture, the dam is used today primarily for water displacement.

Because of the water displacement since its construction, much of the land down-stream, once used as rice-fields, has dried up and is no longer usable. In recent years, the natural areas surrounding the dam has been re-purposed as hiking and relaxation space. Rows of cherry trees line the banks today, turning the area into a small tourist attraction.

Although named and generally known as a dam, legally because of its 8-meter height it is considered a water intake weir. Japan legally requires all dams to be 15 meters or higher in order to be named as such.

== Controversy ==
For a handful of reasons, the dam has become controversial in recent years.

Water quality has been an on-going issue in the area due to the lack of water-flow as well as the regular household waste-water from the nearby Shimanto-cho town and Saga Power plant. This waste discharge and rise in water acidity has been often attributed to the extinction of the endemic Kunimasu fish.

The lack of down-stream water flow has also been attributed to the disillusion of former towns Taisho-cho and Towa-mura. With no active water-flow needed for rice-fields, residents were forced to migrate to other nearby towns and villages. Efforts are continuing in order to restore water flow to these areas and to rehabilitate much of the affected natural space.
