= Senzu Dam =

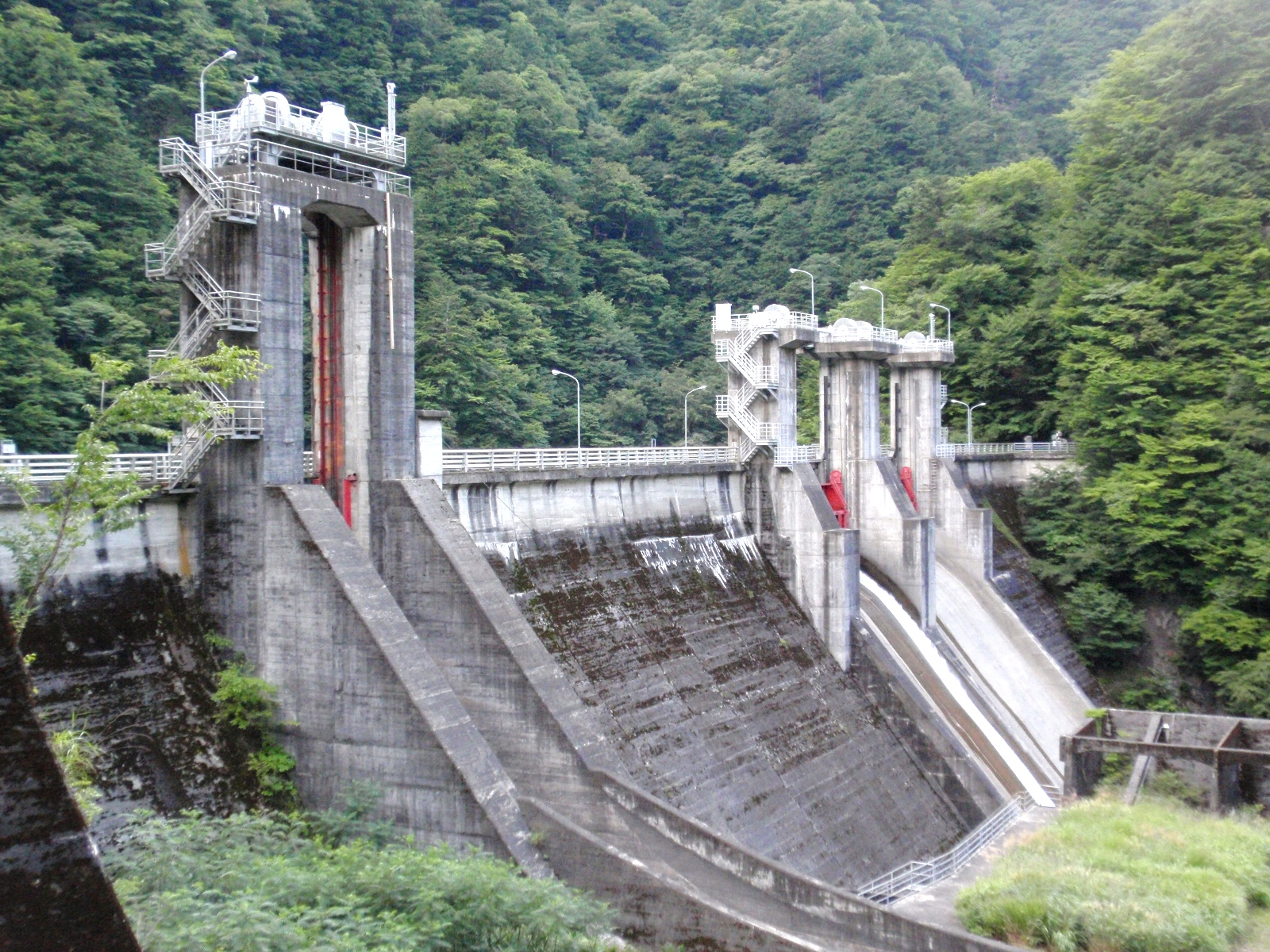
- Interactive map of Senzu Dam
- Official name: 千頭ダム
- Location: Shizuoka Prefecture, Japan
- Coordinates: 35°13′00″N 138°05′25″E
- Construction began: 1930
- Opening date: 1935
- Operator: Chubu Electric Power

Dam and spillways
- Impounds: Sumata River
- Height: 64 m (210 ft)
- Length: 177.7 m (583 ft)

Reservoir
- Total capacity: 4,950,000 m^{3} (175,000,000 cu ft)
- Catchment area: 132 km^{2} (51 sq mi)
- Surface area: 25 ha (62 acres)

The Senzu Dam (千頭ダム, Senzu damu) is a dam on the Sumata River, a tributary of the Ōi River, located in Kawanehon Town, Haibara District, Shizuoka Prefecture on the island of Honshū, Japan.

== History ==
The potential of the Ōi River valley for hydroelectric power development was realized by the Meiji government at the start of the 20th century. The Ōi River was characterized by a high volume of flow and a fast current. Its mountainous upper reaches and tributaries were areas of steep valleys and abundant rainfall, and were sparsely populated. In 1906, a joint venture company, the Anglo-Japanese Hydroelectric Company (日英水力電気, Nichiei Suiroku Denki) was established, and began studies and design work on plans to exploit the potential of the Ōi River and Fuji River in Shizuoka Prefecture. The British interests were bought out by 1921, and the company was renamed Hayakawa Electric (早川電力, Hayakawa Denryoku). As early as the late 1920s, developers began to turn their attention to various tributary streams of the Ōi River, especially the Sumata River, with its steep-sided gorge and considerable flow volume.

Construction work began on the Senzu Dam in 1930 and was completed by 1935 by the Hazama Corporation. The water is channeled eight kilometers away to the Yuyama Power Station (湯山発電所, Yuyama Hatsudenshō) with a rated capacity of 22,200 KW. Construction was facilitated by the Ōigawa Railway, which had been completed by 1927.

Electrical production was nationalized under the aegis of the Japan Electric Generation and Transmission Company (日本発送電株式会社, Nippon Hassoden K.K.) in 1938, which was divided after World War II into regional power corporations. Senzu Dam is now operated and maintained by the Chubu Electric Power Company.

== Design ==
The Senzu Dam is a solid core concrete gravity dam with dual spillways. When completed, it was the highest concrete gravity dam in central Japan, and won a design award from the Japan Civil Engineering Association. However, the designers did not take into account the high levels of silt and sedimentation in the Sumata River. By 2002, it was estimated that over 97.7% of the usable capacity of Senzu Dam was filled with mud, and must now be constantly dredged to permit flow of water for power generation.

== Surroundings ==
Senzu Dam is located near Sumata Onsen and can be reached from Senzu Station on the Ōigawa Railway. The area is popular with mountain climbers heading towards the high peaks of the Minami Alps National Park.
