= Hydroelectricity in Japan =

Hydroelectricity is the second most important renewable energy source after solar energy in Japan with an installed capacity of 50.0 gigawatt (GW) as of 2019. According to the International Hydropower Association Japan was the world's sixth largest producer of hydroelectricity in 2020. Most of Japanese hydroelectric power plants are pumped-storage plants. Conventional hydropower plants account for about 20 GW out of the total installed capacity as of 2007.

Conventional hydropower potential of Japan is considered to be almost fully developed, with little opportunity for further capacity increase. In recent years, almost exclusively pumped storage plants were commissioned, significantly increasing the ratio of pumped storage capacity over conventional hydro. The large capacity of pumped storage hydropower was built to store energy from nuclear power plants, which until the Fukushima disaster constituted a large part of Japan electricity generation. As of 2015, Japan is the country with the highest capacity of pumped-storage hydroelectricity in the world, with 26 GW of power installed. After the 2011 nuclear power shutdowns, pumped-storage plants have been increasingly used to balance the variable generation of renewable energy sources such as solar, which have been growing rapidly in recent years.

As of September 2011, Japan had 1,198 small hydropower plants with a total capacity of 3,225 megawatt (MW). The smaller plants accounted for 6.6% of Japan's total hydropower capacity. The remaining capacity was filled by large and medium hydropower stations, typically sited at large dams. Cost per kilowatt-hour for power from smaller plants was high at ¥15-100, hindering further development of the energy source.

== List of hydroelectric power stations ==
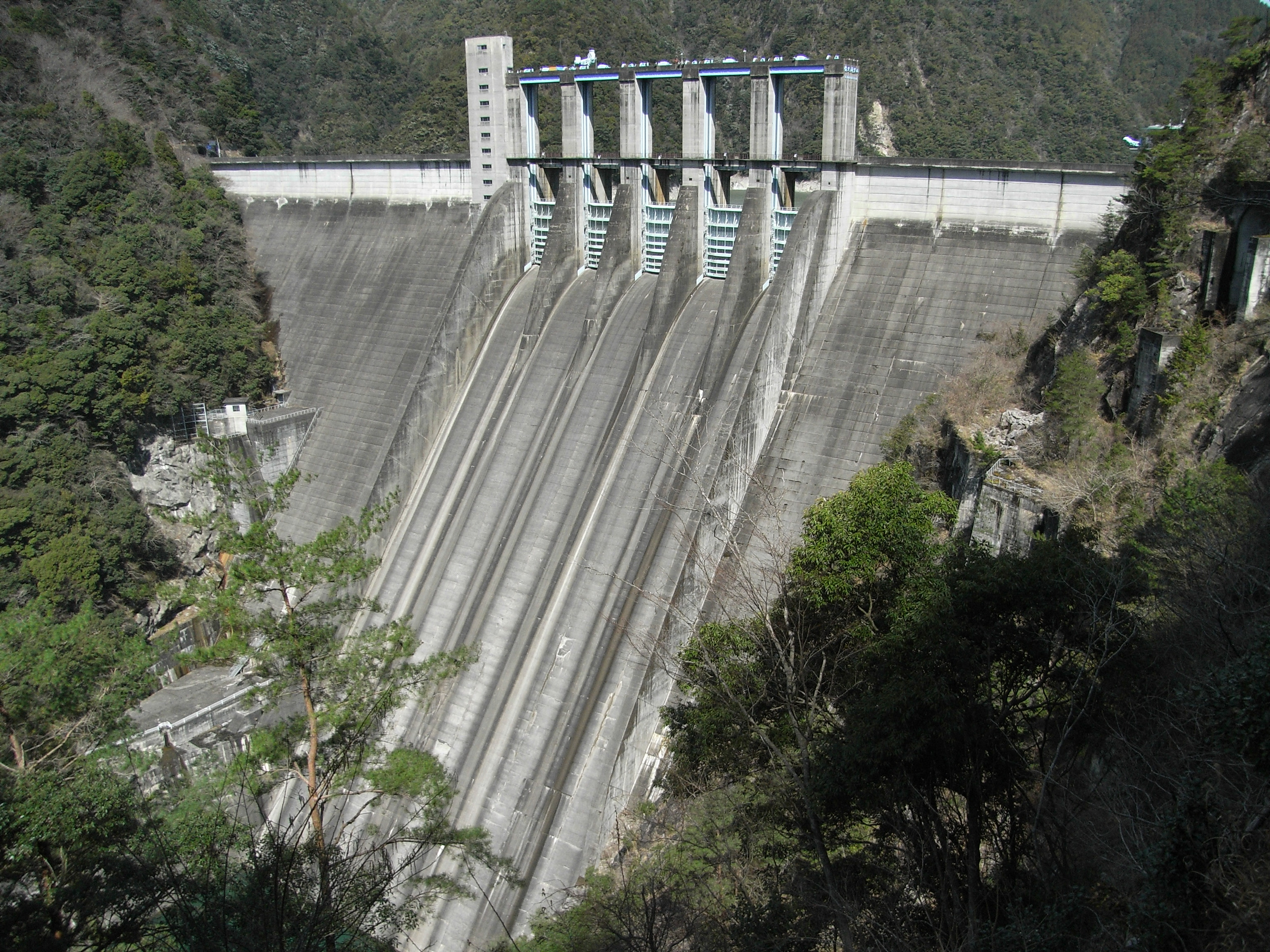
The Sakuma Dam

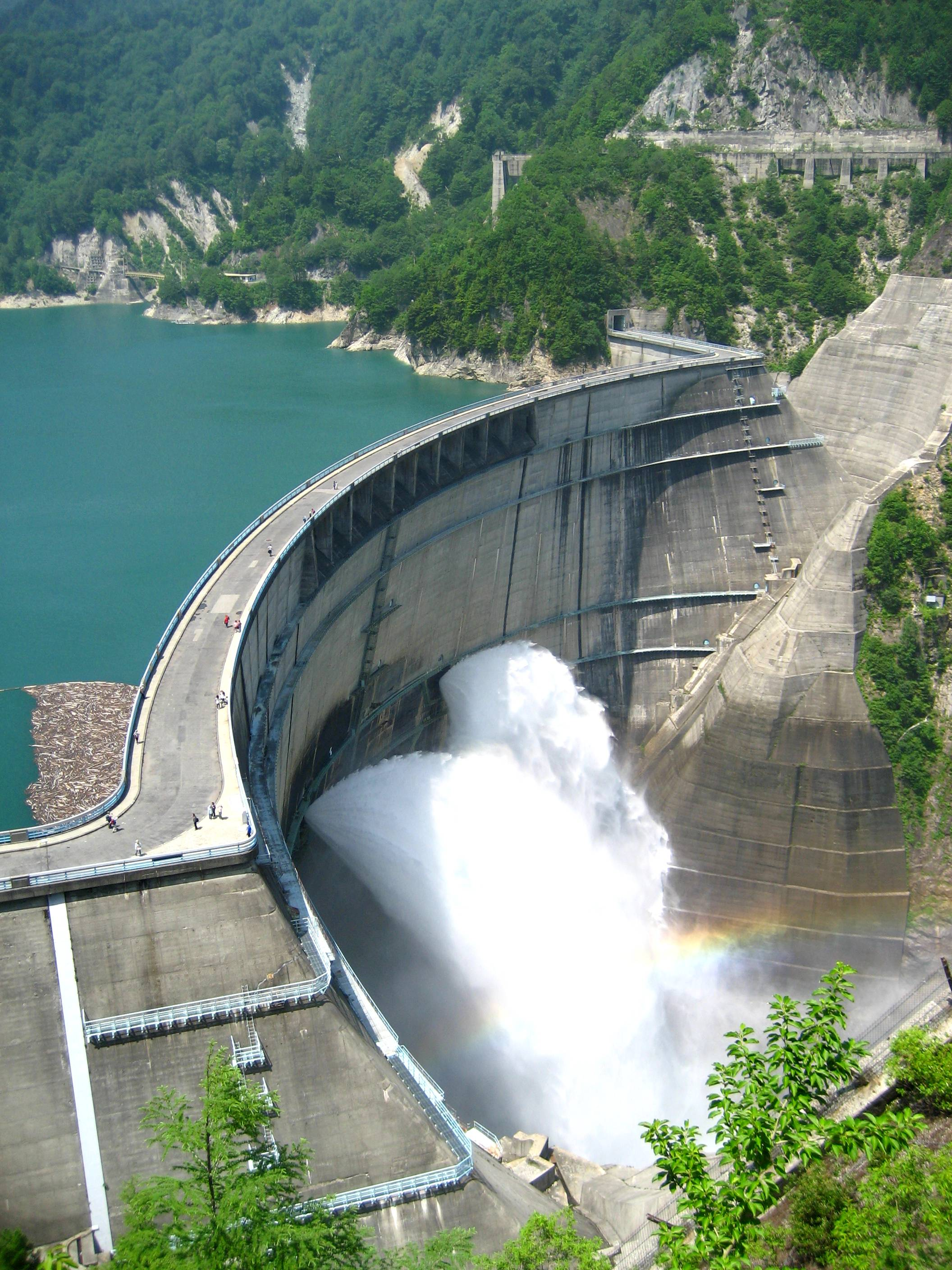
The Kurobe Dam

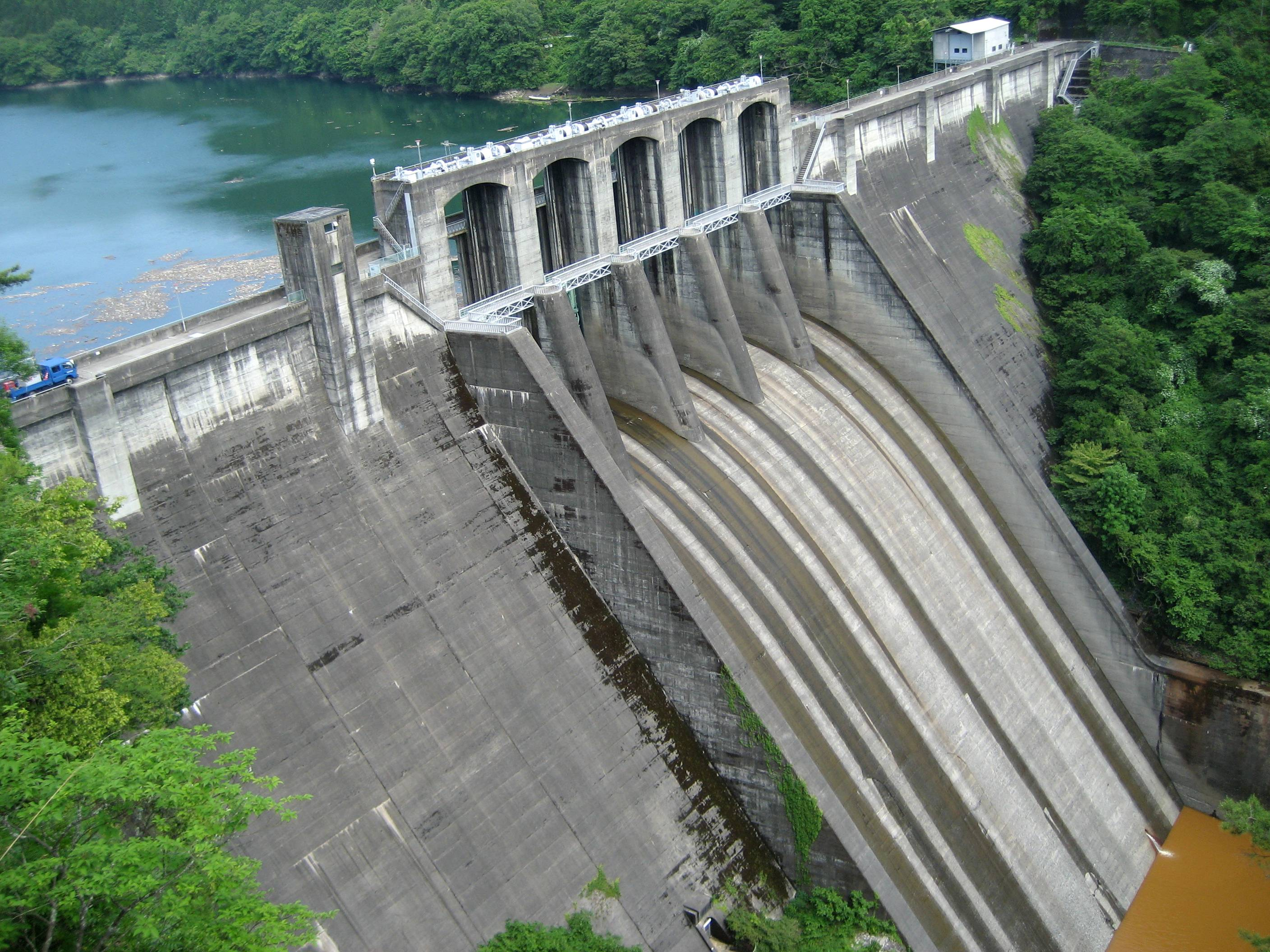
The Maruyama Dam

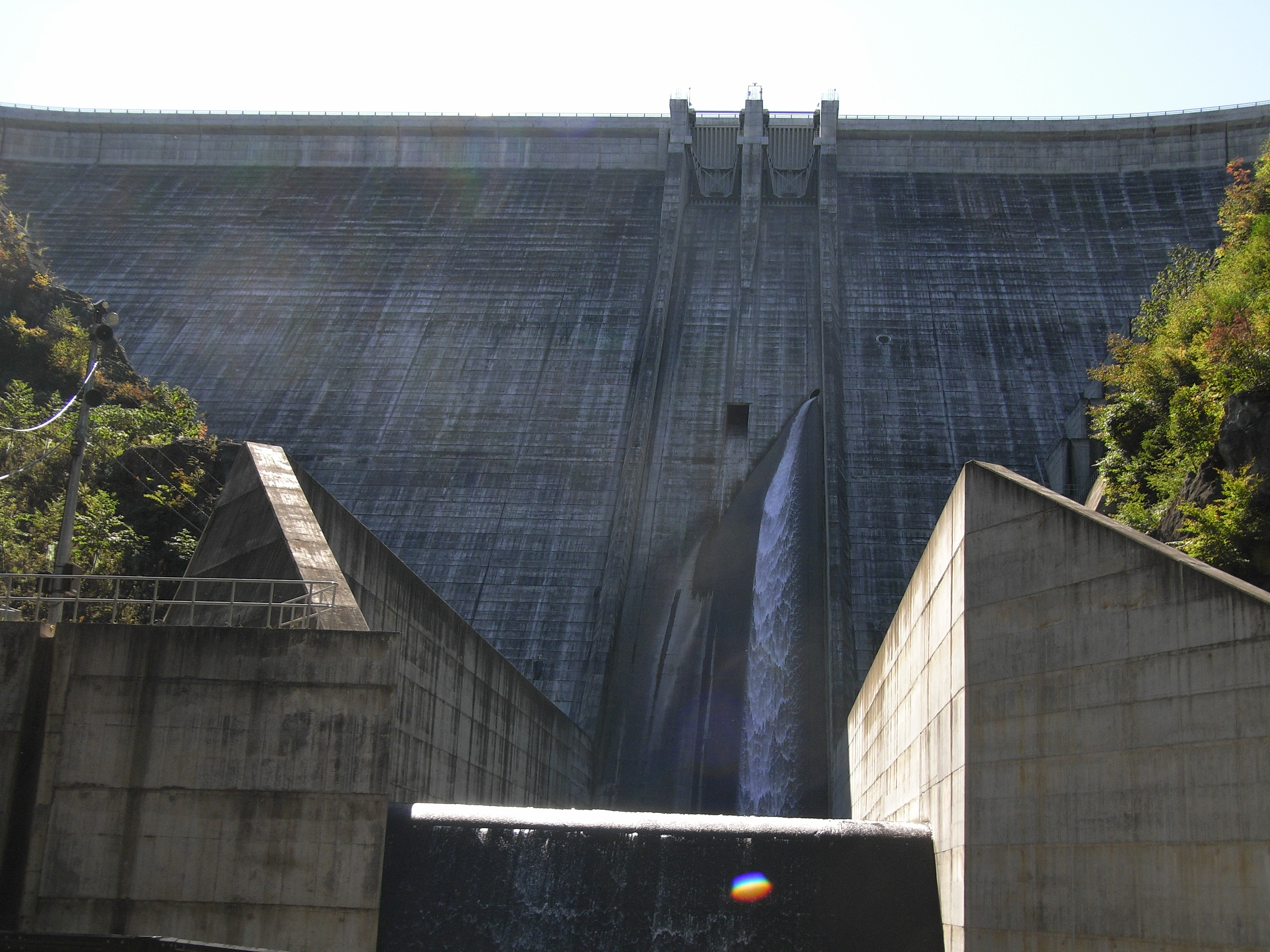
The Ueno Dam, lower reservoir of the pumped-storage Kannagawa Hydropower Plant

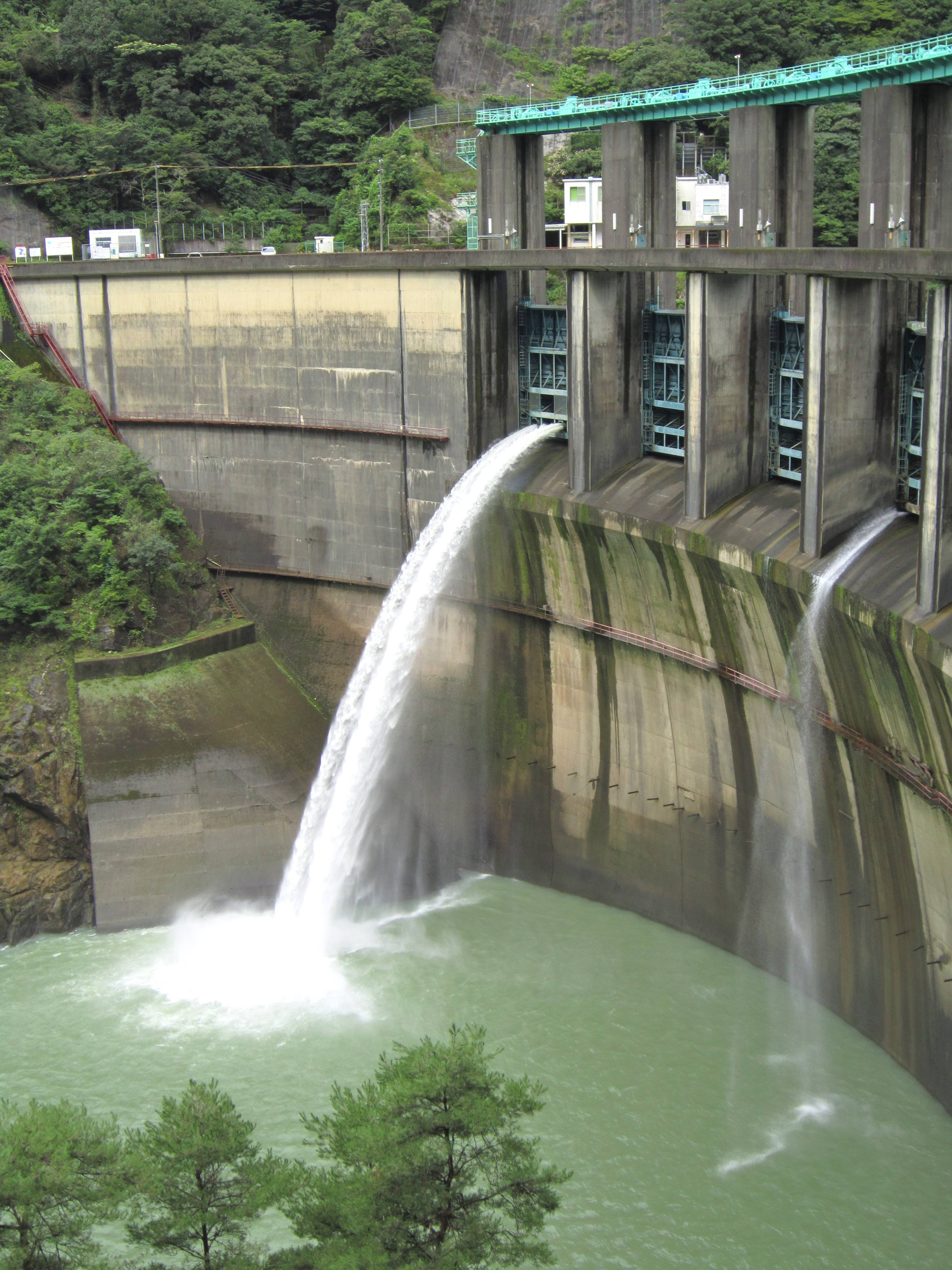
The Futatsuya-Tōshukō Dam

Station	Capacity (MW)	Prefecture	Coordinates	Status	Type
Akiba Dam	127.1	Shizuoka	34°58′20″N 137°49′42″E	Operational	pumped storage
Amagase Dam	92	Kyoto	34°52′51″N 135°49′41″E	Operational	conventional
Arimine Dam	534	Toyama	36°29′22″N 137°26′55″E	Operational	conventional
Dashidaira Dam	124			Operational	
Funagira Dam	32	Shizuoka	34°53′26″N 137°48′54″E	Operational	
Hatanagi-I Hydroelectric Dam	137	Shizuoka	35°19′17″N 138°10′59″E	Operational	pumped storage
Hatanagi-II Hydroelectric Dam	85	Shizuoka	35°18′29″N 138°12′11″E	Operational	pumped storage
Hiraoka Dam	101	Nagano		Operational	
Honkawa	600				pumped storage
Ikawa Dam	62	Shizuoka	35°12′38″N 138°13′22″E	Operational	
Ikehara Pumped Storage Plant	350			Operational	pumped storage
Imaichi Pumped Storage Plant	1,050	Tochigi	36°49′31″N 139°39′58″E	Operational	pumped storage
Kadonogawa Power Station	800			Operational	pumped storage
Kannagawa Hydropower Plant ^{U/C}	2,820	Nagano	36°00′18″N 138°39′09″E	Operational	pumped storage
Kazunogawa Pumped Storage Plant	1,200	Yamanashi	35°43′07″N 138°55′47″E	Operational	pumped storage
Kinugawa-Kurobe Dam	127			Operational	
Kisenyama Pumped Storage Plant	466	Kyoto	34°53′30″N 135°51′34″E	Operational	pumped storage
Konoyama Dam	126	Niigata		Operational	
Kurobe Dam	335	Toyama	36°33′30″N 137°40′00″E	Operational	
Kuroda Dam	315	Aichi	35°11′14″N 137°28′34″E	Operational	
Maruyama Dam	185	Gifu	35°28′08″N 137°10′20″E	Operational	
Matsubara Dam	50.6	Oita	33°11′39″N 130°59′38″E		
Masegawa Dam	288			Operational	
Matanoagawa Pumped Storage Plant	1,200	Tottori	35°14′44″N 133°29′30″E	Operational	pumped storage
Miboro Dam	215	Gifu	36°08′17.7″N 136°54′38.9″E	Operational	
Midono Pumped Storage Plant	122			Operational	pumped storage
Miho Dam	7.4	Kanagawa	35°24′37″N 139°02′30″E	Operational	
Misakubo Dam	50	Shizuoka	35°11′05″N 137°55′54″E	Operational	
Miyagase Dam	24	Kanagawa	35°32′26″N 139°15′09″E	Operational	
Miyanaka Dam	449	Niigata		Operational	
Nagano Pumped Storage Plant	220			Operational	pumped storage
Niikappu Pumped Storage Plant	200			Operational	pumped storage
Nishiotaki Dam	234	Nagano		Operational	
Numappara Pumped Storage Plant	675			Operational	pumped storage
Ohashi Dam	615	Kōchi	33°46′13″N 133°20′12″E	Operational	pumped storage
Ōigawa Dam	68.2	Shizuoka	35°09′53″N 138°08′34″E	Operational	
Okawachi Pumped Storage Power Station	1,280	Hyōgo		Operational	pumped storage
Okukiyotsu Pumped Storage Power Station (1 & 2)	1,600	Niigata		Operational	pumped storage
Okinawa Yanbaru Seawater Pumped Storage Power Station	30	Okinawa	26°40′25″N 128°15′56″E	Operational	pumped storage
Okutadami Dam	560	Niigata/Fukushima	37°09′12″N 139°15′00″E	Operational	conventional
Okutataragi Pumped Storage Plant	1,932	Hyōgo	35°14′12″N 134°51′23″E	Operational	pumped storage
Okuyoshino Pumped Storage Plant	1,206	Nara	34°7′4″N 135°49′16″E	Operational	pumped storage
Otori Dam	182	Fukushima	37°12′53″N 139°12′50″E	Operational	
Sagami Dam	31	Kanagawa;	35°36′56″N 139°11′43″E	Operational	
Sakuma Dam	350	Aichi	35°05′58″N 137°47′39″E	Operational	conventional
Sasamagawa Dam	58	Shizuoka	34°58′17″N 138°05′38″E	Operational	
Senzu Dam	22.2	Shizuoka	35°13′00″N 138°05′25″E	Operational	
Shimogo Pumped Storage Power Station	1,000	Fukushima		Operational	pumped storage
Shin-Takasegawa Pumped Storage Plant	1,280	Nagano	36°28′26″N 137°41′23″E	Operational	pumped storage
Shinanogawa Pumped Storage Plant	234			Operational	pumped storage
Shintoyone Pumped Storage Plant	1,125	Aichi	35°07′33″N 137°45′38″E	Operational	pumped storage
Shiobara Pumped Storage Plant	900	Tochigi		Operational	pumped storage
Shiogō Dam	58	Shizuoka	35°00′05″N 138°05′15″E	Operational	
Shiroyama Dam	275	Kanagawa	35°35′09″N 139°17′22″E	Operational	
Tagokura Dam	390	Fukushima	37°18′38″N 139°17′13″E	Operational	
Takami Pumped Storage Plant	200			Operational	pumped storage
Taki Dam	92	Fukushima	37°23′13″N 139°32′02″E	Operational	
Tamahara Pumped Storage Power Station	1,200	Gunma	36°46′56″N 139°03′23″E	Operational	pumped storage
Tashiro Dam	40.1	Shizuoka	35°29′55″N 138°14′47″E	Operational	
Tedorigawa I Dam	250			Operational	
Tokuyama Dam	153	Gifu	35°39′55″N 136°30′08″E	Operational	
Okuyahagi Pumped Storage Power Station	1,160	Gifu	35°11′59″N 137°27′31″E	Operational	pumped storage
Yagisawa Pumped Storage Plant	240			Operational	pumped storage
Yomihaki Power Station	112			Operational	

== See also ==
- Energy in Japan
- Electricity sector in Japan
- Geothermal power in Japan
- Wind power in Japan
- Solar power in Japan
- Renewable energy by country
