= Okawachi Pumped Storage Power Station =

Coordinates: 35.1281691°N 134.7148408°E

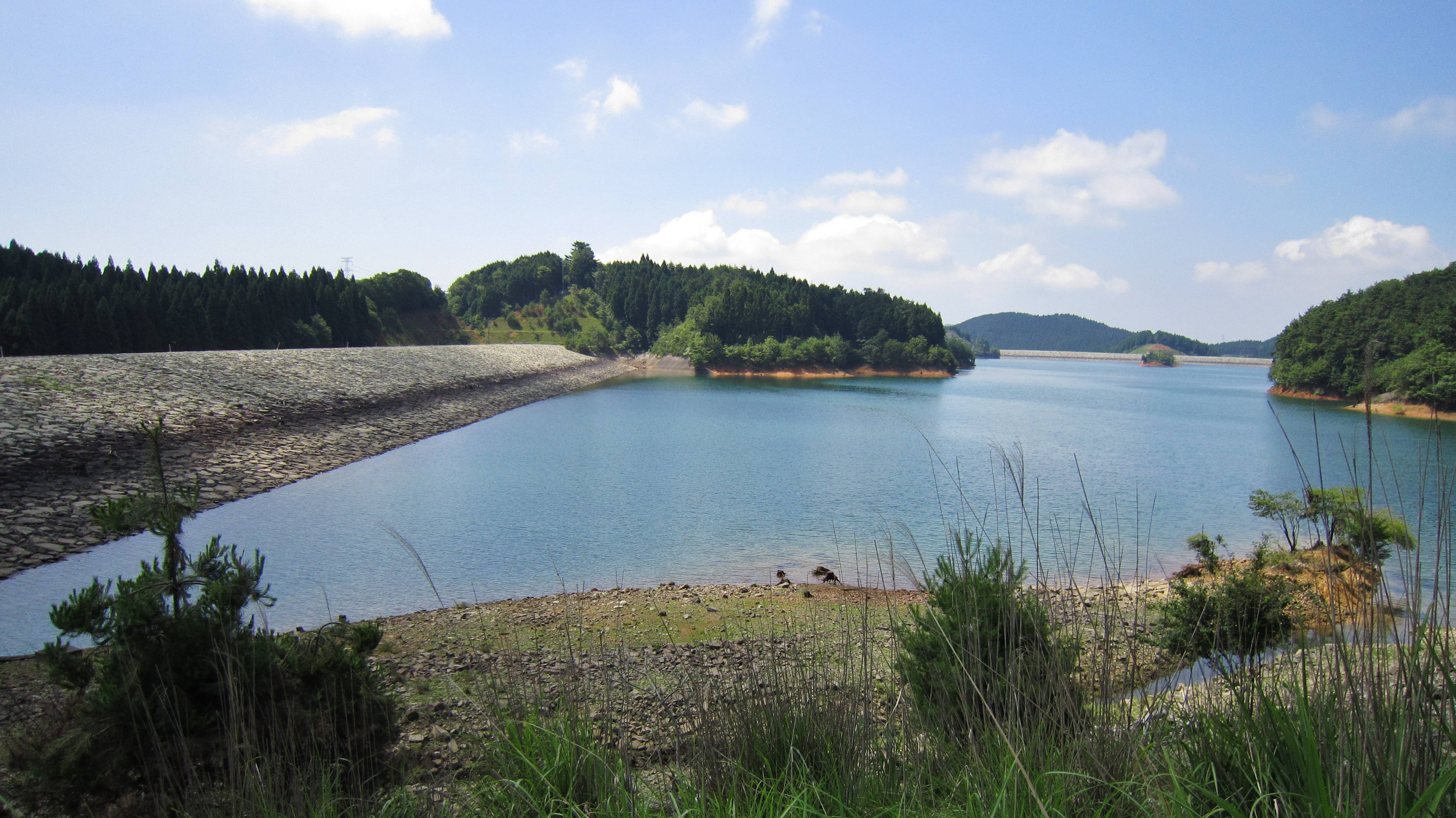
- View of the upper reservoir
- Country: Japan
- Location: Hase, Kanzaki district, Hyōgo
- Status: Operational
- Construction began: 1980
- Opening date: 1992–1995
- Operator(s): KEPCO

Upper reservoir
- Creates: Ota Reservoir
- Total capacity: 10,150,000 m^{3} (8,230 acre⋅ft)

Lower reservoir
- Creates: Hase Reservoir
- Total capacity: 9,604,000 m^{3} (7,786 acre⋅ft)

Power Station
- Hydraulic head: 394.7 m (1,295 ft)
- Pump-generators: 2 x 329, 2 x 331 MW reversible Francis turbines
- Installed capacity: 1,280 MW (1,720,000 hp)

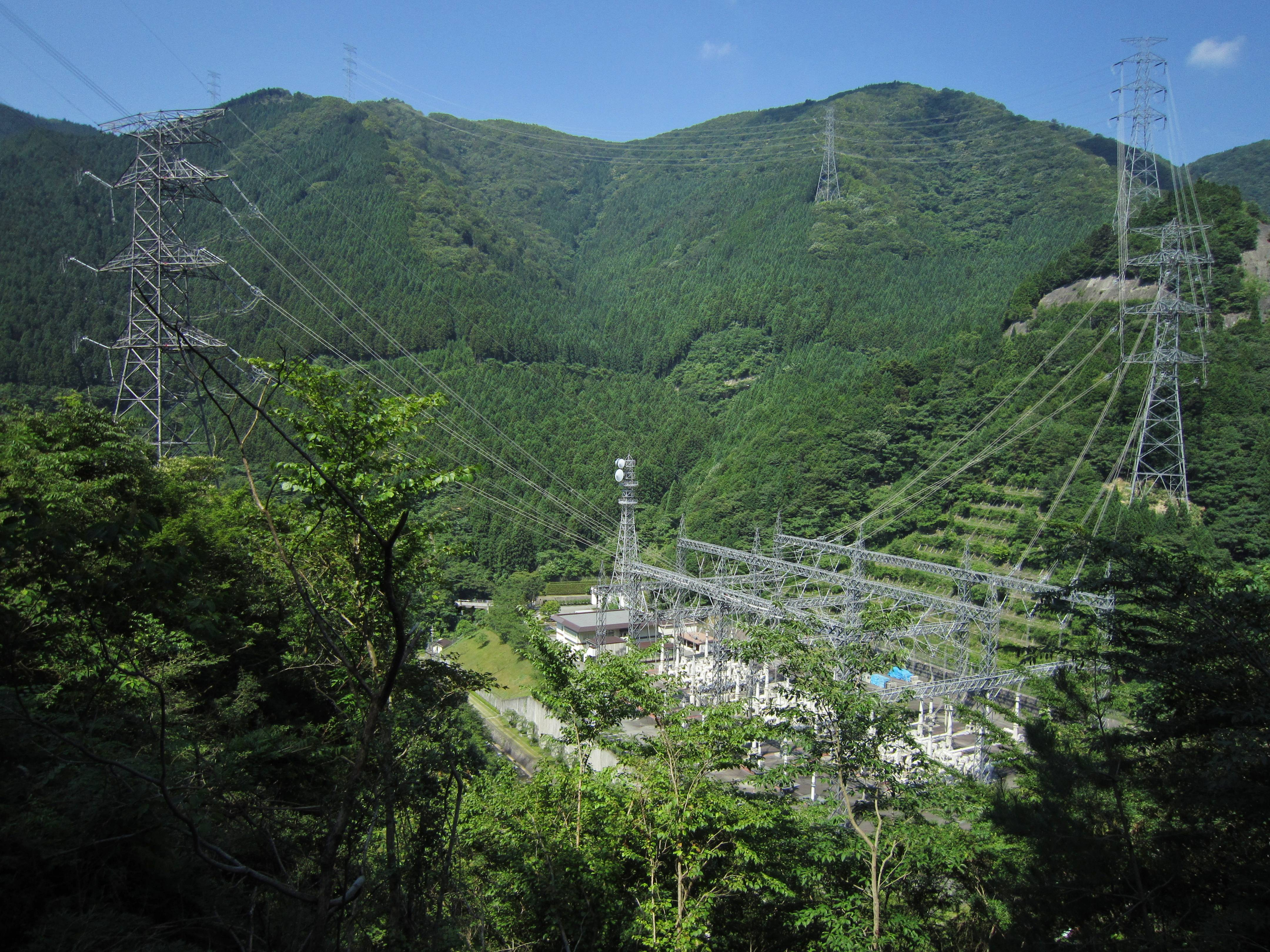
Okawachi power station

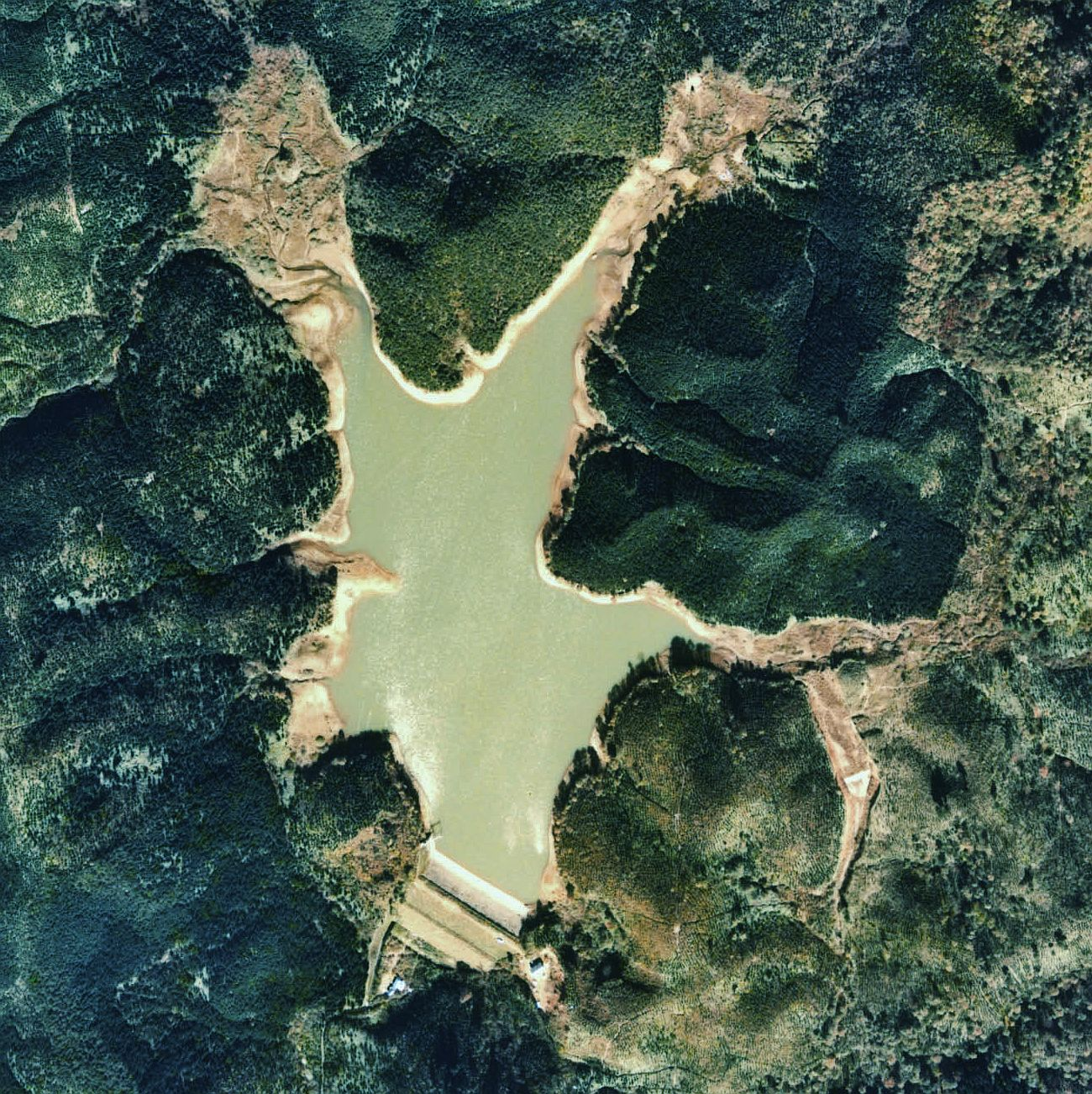
Aerial view of the Ota reservoir in 1976, before the enlargement

The Okawachi Pumped Storage Power Station (Japanese: 大河内発電所, Hepburn: Ōkawachi Hatsudensho) is a large pumped-storage hydroelectric power station in Kamikawa Town in the Kanzaki District of Hyōgo Prefecture, Japan. With a total installed capacity of 1,280 megawatts (1,720,000 hp), it is one of the largest pumped-storage power stations in Japan. The facility is run by the Kansai Electric Power Company (KEPCO). The power plant started operation in October 1992 and all four units were commissioned by June 1995.

Like most pumped-storage facilities, the power station uses two reservoirs, releasing and pumping as the demand rises and falls. The Ota artificial lake is the upper reservoir, and is contained by five dams, numbered Ota Dam 1 to 5. The reservoir is fed by the river Ota. Hase reservoir is the lower reservoir and is contained by the Hase Dam. The upper Ota dams are rock-fill dams, while the lower Hase Dam is a gravity dam.

The upper Ota reservoir was built during the Meiji period to feed the Minamioda conventional hydroelectric power plant (南小田第一発電所, Minamioda Dai Ichi Hatsudenjo). The plant started operation in December 1909 with a maximum output of 1450 kW. A second conventional hydroelectric power plant (南小田第二発電所, Minamioda Dai Ni Hatsudenjo) with a generation capacity of 720 kW was added in May 1919. The enlargement of the Ota reservoir and the building of the new Hase lower reservoir was implemented by Kansai Electric Power Company, with start of operation of the new pumped storage plant in 1992. The plant reached the current capacity in 1996 with all the four units in operation.

The power station employs four generation/pumping units. Two of the units are adjustable speed systems manufactured by Hitachi, allowing for a rapid variation of power levels during both pumping and generation. This allows the power station to respond more effectively to grid requests for the balancing of demand and supply, a role which is usually performed by thermal power plants. These units were the first large-capacity adjustable-speed pumped storage hydroelectric systems in the world.

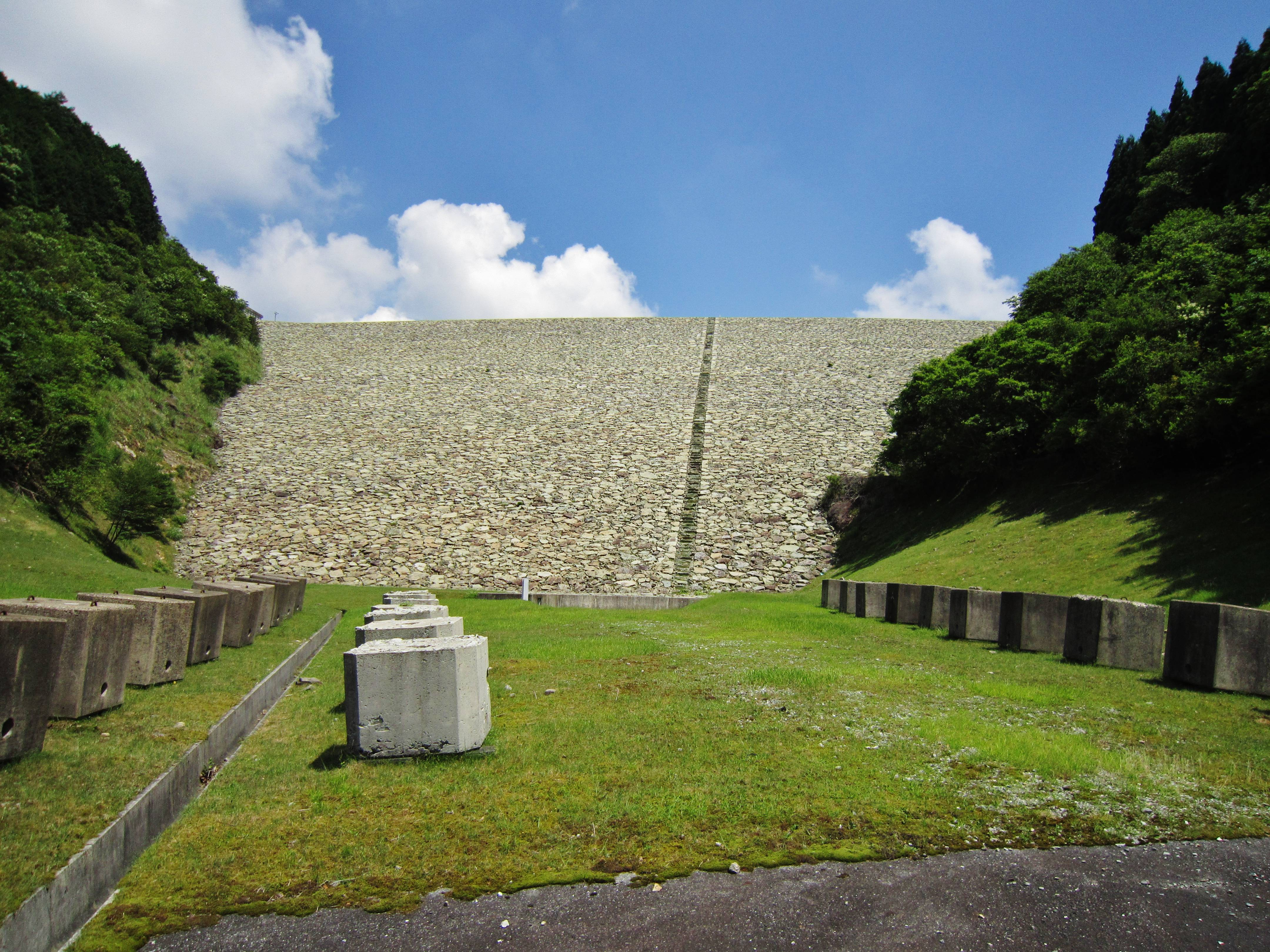
Ota Dam 1

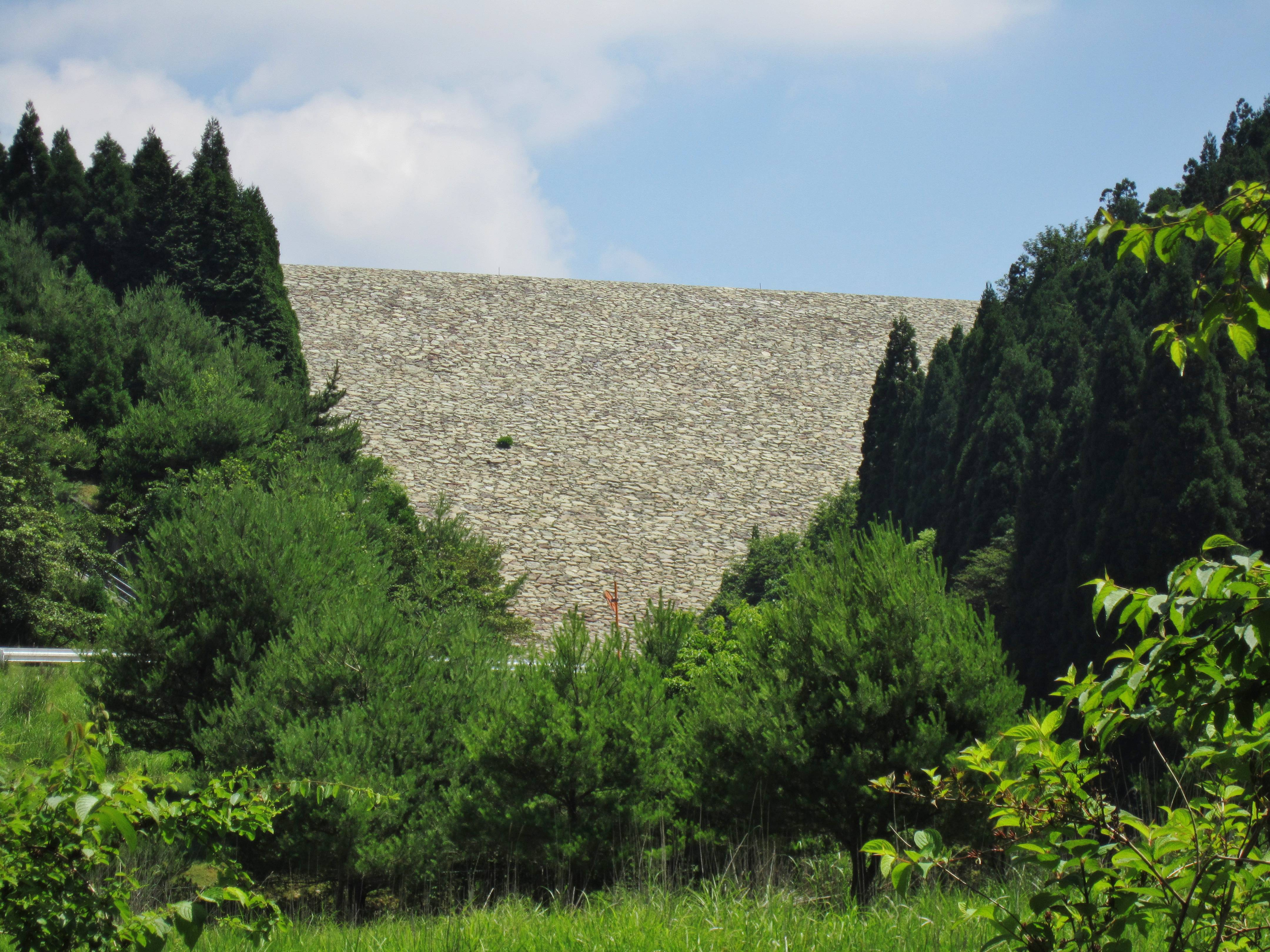
Ota Dam 2

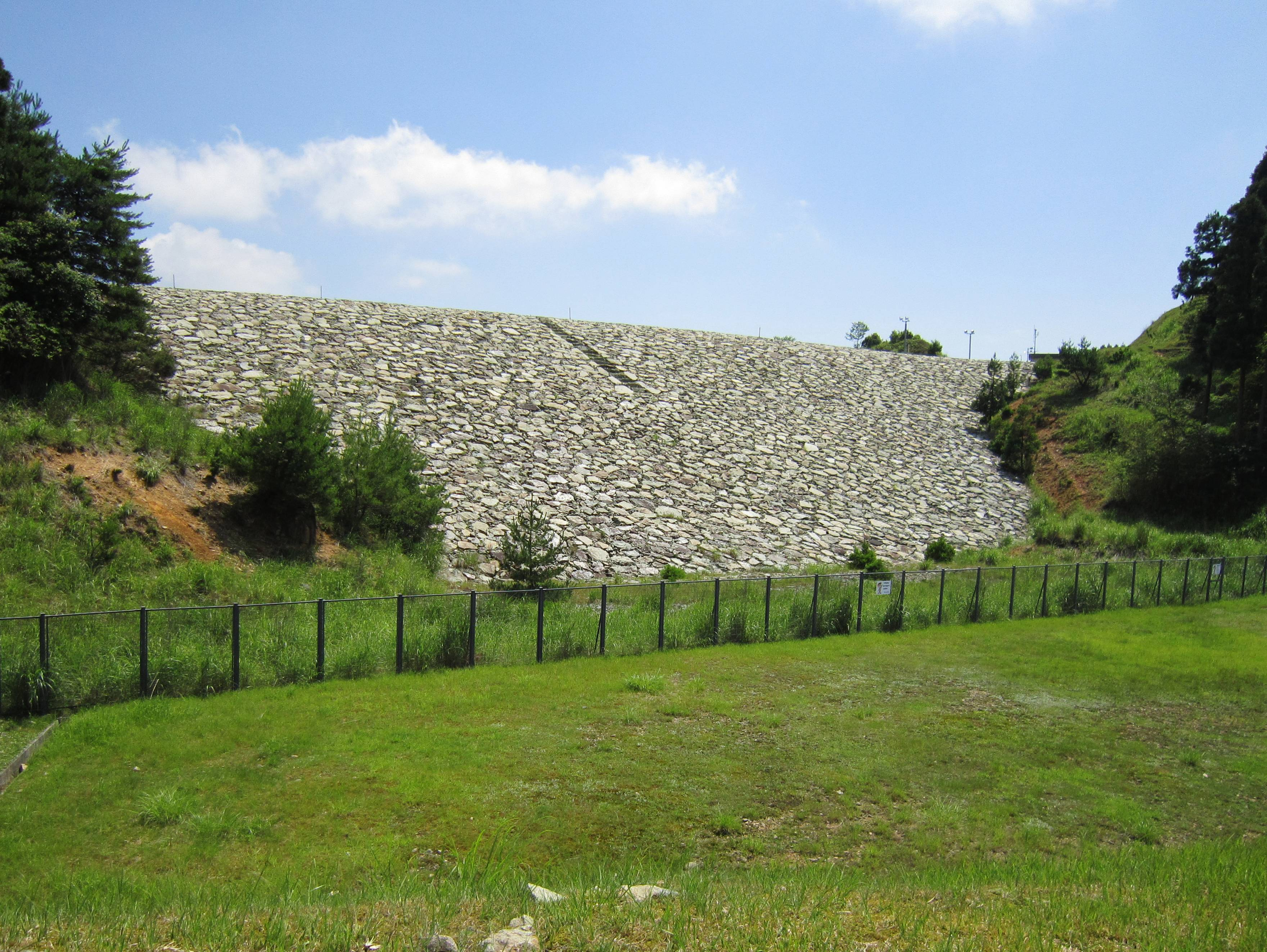
Ota Dam 5

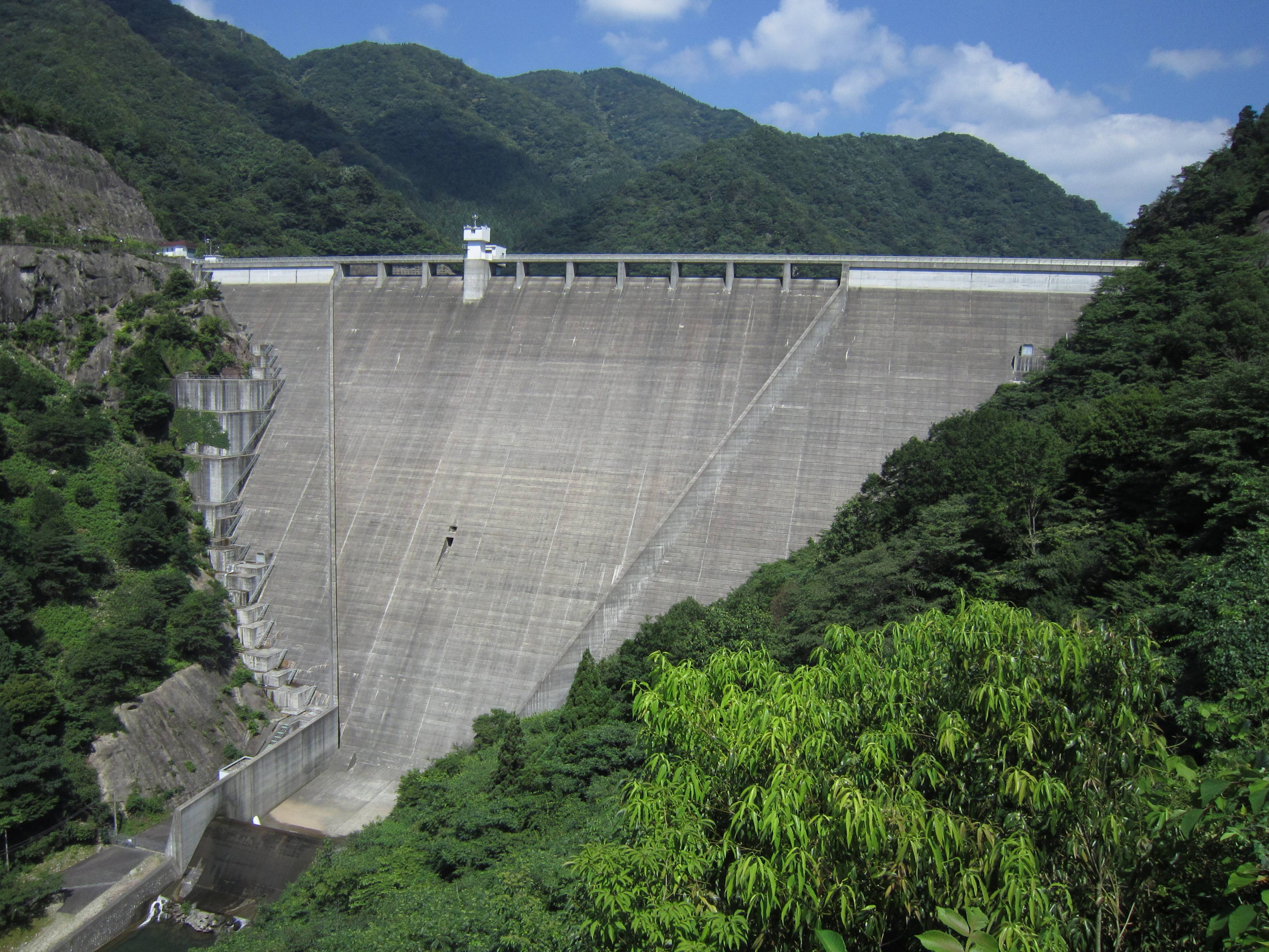
Hase Dam

== See also ==
- List of power stations in Japan
- Hydroelectricity in Japan
- List of pumped-storage hydroelectric power stations
