= Shiobara Pumped Storage Plant =

Shiobara Pumped Storage Power Station
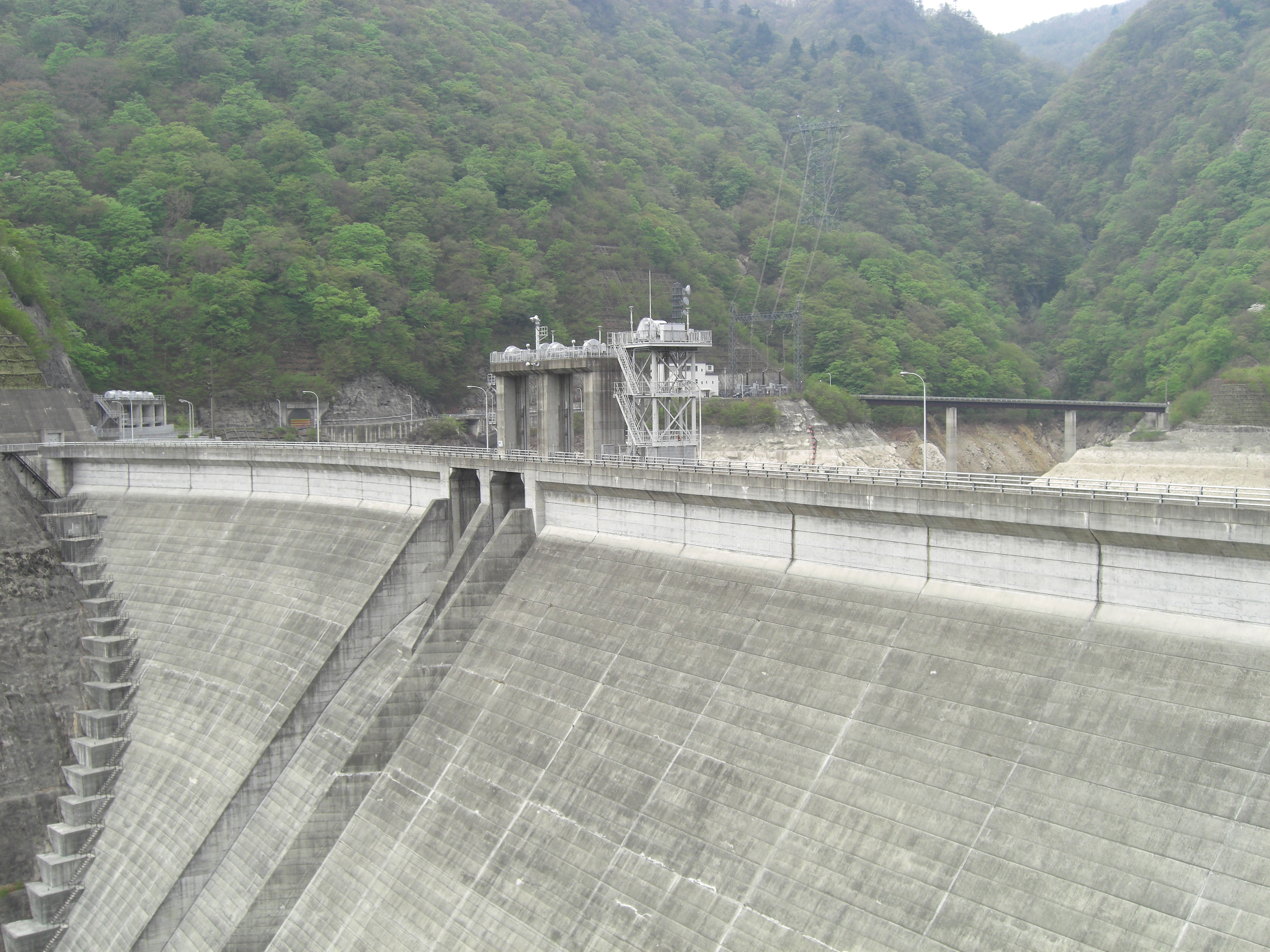
- View of the Sabigawa Dam
- Country: Japan
- Location: Nasushiobara, Tochigi Prefecture
- Coordinates: 36°59′44″N 139°52′07″E
- Status: Operational
- Opening date: 1994
- Operator(s): TEPCO

Upper reservoir
- Total capacity: 11,900,000 m^{3} (9,600 acre⋅ft)

Lower reservoir
- Total capacity: 10,500,000 m^{3} (8,500 acre⋅ft)

Power Station
- Hydraulic head: 338 m (1,109 ft)
- Pump-generators: 3 x 300 MW
- Installed capacity: 900 MW (1,200,000 hp)

The Shiobara Pumped Storage Power Station (塩原発電所) is a pumped-storage hydroelectric power station in Nasushiobara, in the Tochigi Prefecture of Japan. It has a total installed capacity of 900 megawatts (1,200,000 hp). The power plant started operation in 1994.

Like most pumped-storage facilities, the power station uses two reservoirs, releasing and pumping as the demand rises and falls. The upper reservoir is contained by the Yashio Dam, a rock-fill dam. The lower reservoir is contained by the Sabigawa Dam, a concrete gravity dam.

The power station employs three 300 MW pumping/generation units. The first 2 units started operation on 24 June 1994 and the third unit was started on 16 June 1995.

== See also ==
- List of power stations in Japan
- Hydroelectricity in Japan
- List of pumped-storage hydroelectric power stations
