= Shiogō Dam =

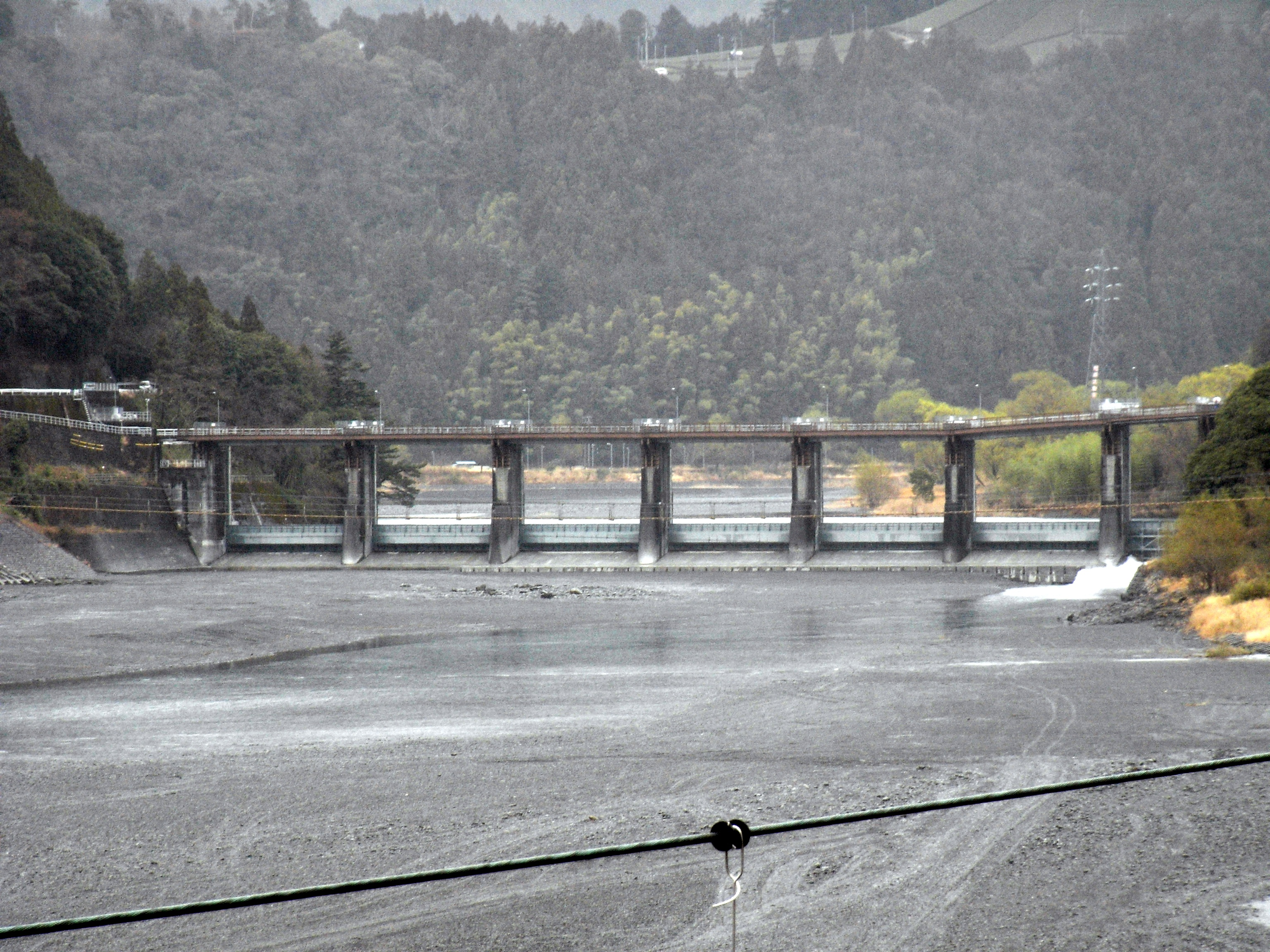
- Interactive map of Shiogō Dam
- Official name: 塩郷ダム
- Location: Shizuoka Prefecture, Japan
- Coordinates: 35°00′05″N 138°05′15″E
- Construction began: 1958
- Opening date: 1961
- Operator: Chubu Electric Power

Dam and spillways
- Impounds: Ōi River
- Height: 3.2 meters
- Length: 146 meters

Reservoir
- Total capacity: NA
- Catchment area: NA
- Surface area: NA

The Shiogō Dam (塩郷ダム, Shiogō Damu) is a dam on the main stream of the Ōi River, in the town of Kawanehon, Haibara District, Shizuoka Prefecture on the island of Honshū, Japan.

== History ==
The potential of the Ōi River valley for hydroelectric power development was realized by the Meiji government at the start of the 20th century. The Ōi River was characterized by a high volume of flow and a fast current. Its mountainous upper reaches and tributaries were areas of steep valleys and abundant rainfall, and were sparsely populated. From the 1930s through the 1960s, numerous concrete gravity dams had been constructed on the main flow of the Ōi River, and to its various tributary streams.

The Shiogō Dam and neighboring Sasamagawa Dam were constructed to provide water for the 58,000 KW Kawaguchi Hydroelectric Plant built by the Shimada city government. Construction work began in 1958 and was completed by 1961. Although styled as a "dam", the structure is in fact a weir, as it does not meet the 15-meter height stipulated in Japanese construction regulations to qualify as a "dam".

== Controversy ==
The Shiogō Dam was built in an area where the Ōi River made a number of turns over swift rapids. The area was a popular fishery for ayu and Japanese dace, which the dam replaced with an area of stagnant, algae-polluted water with an offensive smell. The dam also reduced the amount of sand and silt reaching the mouth of the Ōi River, thus further contributing to shoreline erosion. Legal efforts by local municipalities and landowners to recover water rights over the Ōi River and force the dismantling of the dam have consistently failed in courts.
