= Kōnoyama Dam =

Konoyama Dam
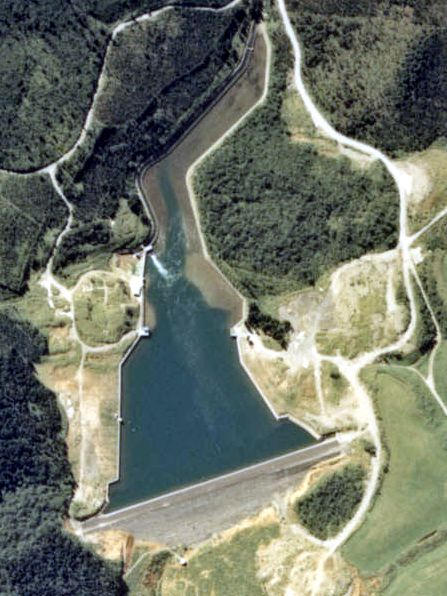

- Location within Japan
- Official name: 高野山ダム
- Location: Tsunan, Niigata, Japan
- Coordinates: 36°56′38″N 138°38′14″E
- Purpose: Power
- Construction began: 1968
- Opening date: 1971; 55 years ago

Dam and spillways
- Type of dam: Earth fill dam
- Impounds: Shinano River

Reservoir
- Active capacity: 560,000 m^{3} (20,000,000 ft^{3})
- Inactive capacity: 560,000 m^{3} (20,000,000 ft^{3})
- Catchment area: 218.6 km (135.8 mi)

Power Station
- Operator: Tokyo Electric Power Company
- Installed capacity: 126 MW

Konoyama Dam (高野山ダム, Kōnoyama damu) is a dam in Tsunan, Niigata Prefecture, Japan, completed in 1971.
