= Dashidaira Dam =

Dam in Toyama Prefecture, Japan

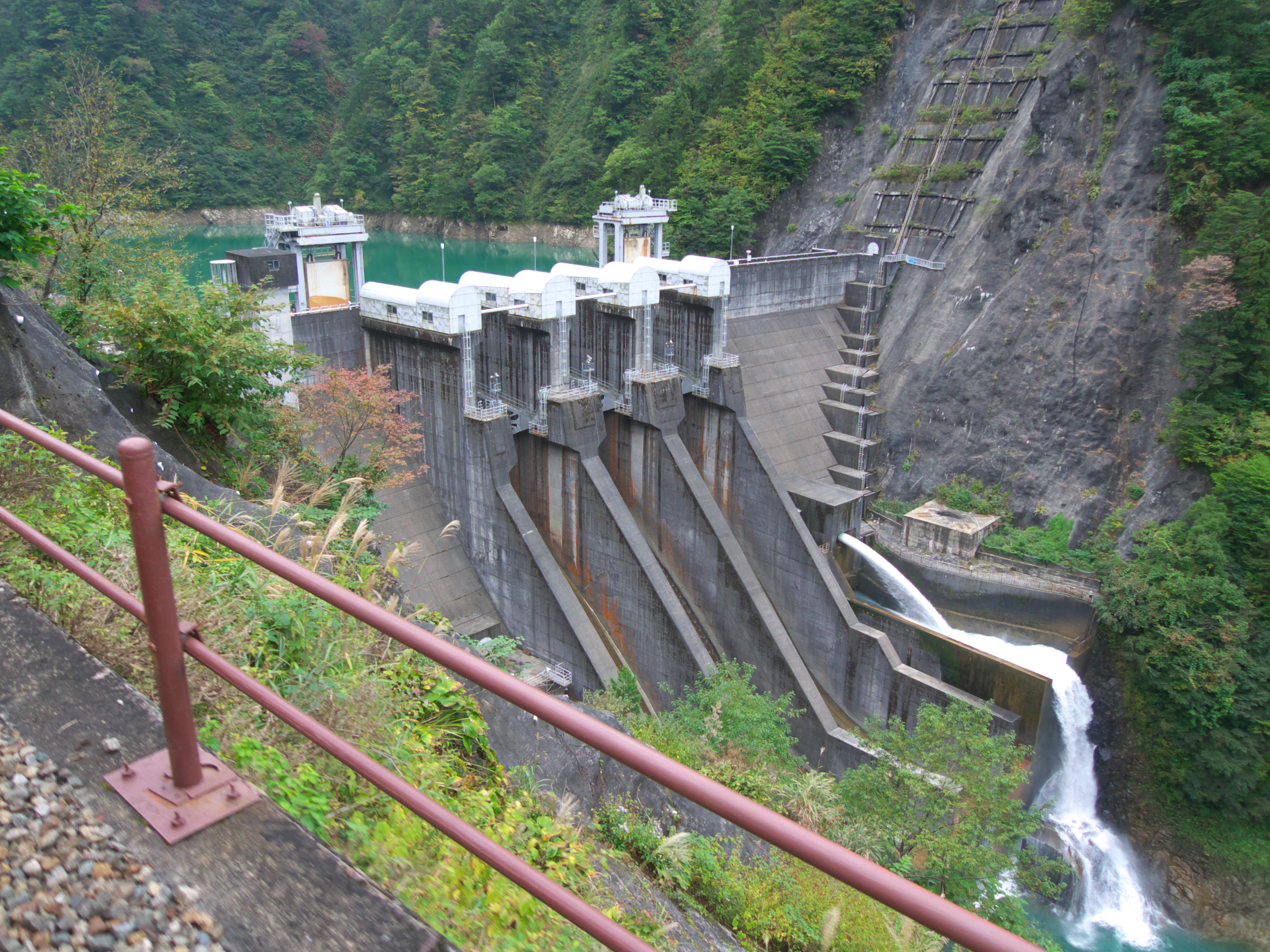

- Location within Japan
- Interactive map of Dashidaira Dam
- Location: Toyama Prefecture, Japan
- Coordinates: 36°46′13″N 137°37′52″E
- Construction began: 1980
- Opening date: 1985

Dam and spillways
- Height: 76.7 m (252 ft)
- Length: 136 m (446 ft)

Reservoir
- Total capacity: 9010 thousand cubic meters
- Catchment area: 461.2 sq. km
- Surface area: 35 hectares

Dashidaira Dam is a gravity dam located in Toyama prefecture in Japan. The dam is used for power production. The catchment area of the dam is 461.2 km^{2}. The dam impounds about 35 ha of land when full and can store 9010 thousand cubic meters of water. The construction of the dam was started on 1980 and completed in 1985.
