= Amagase Dam =

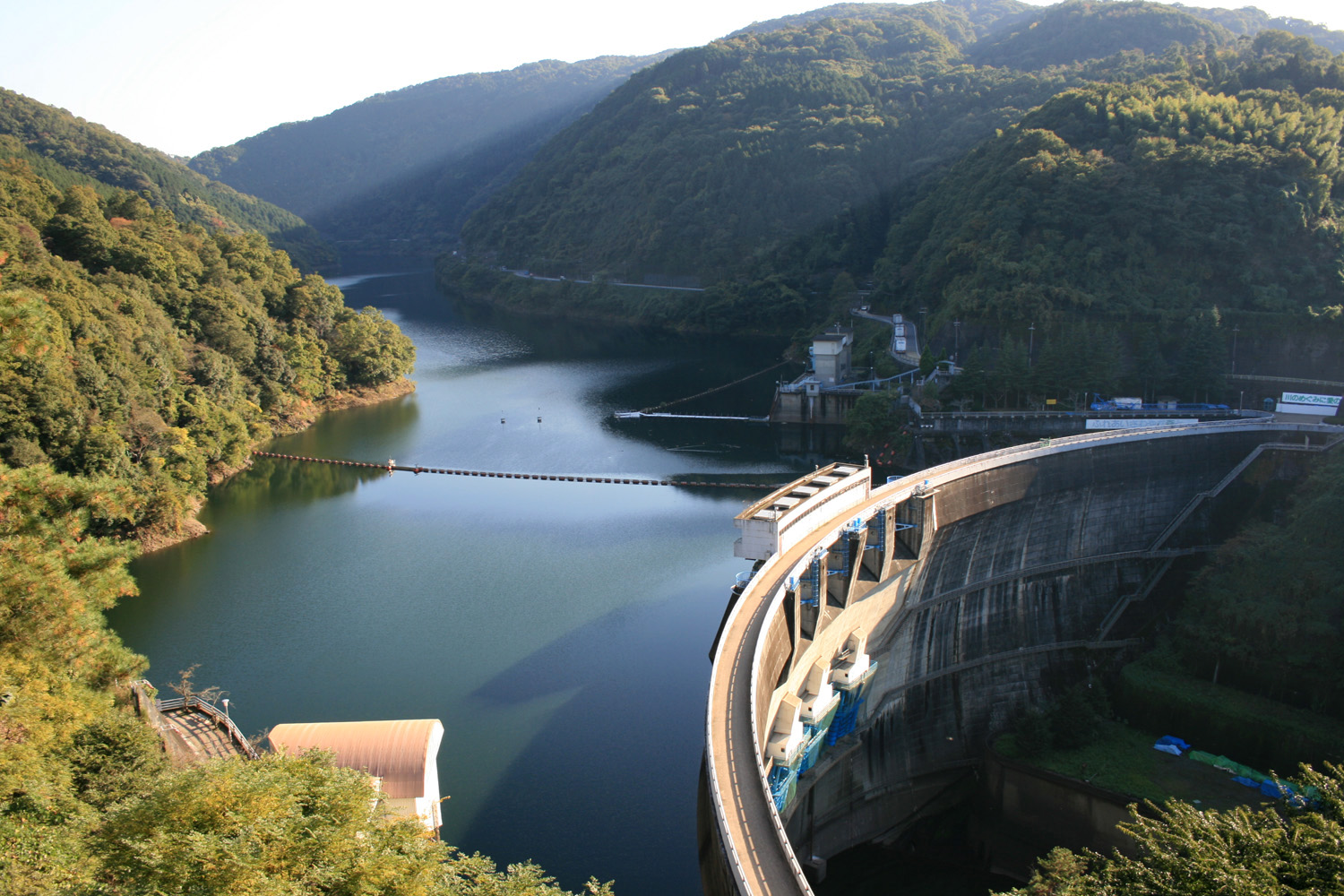

- Location within Japan
- Country: Japan
- Location: Uji, Kyoto
- Coordinates: 34°52′51″N 135°49′41″E
- Status: In use
- Construction began: 1955
- Opening date: 1964

Dam and spillways
- Type of dam: Arch, variable-radius
- Impounds: Uji River
- Height: 73 m (240 ft)
- Length: 254 m (833 ft)
- Dam volume: 162,000 m^{3} (5,720,976 ft^{3})
- Spillways: 4
- Spillway type: Crest, controlled overflow
- Spillway capacity: 680 m^{3}/s (24,014 cu ft/s)

Reservoir
- Creates: Lake Hōō
- Total capacity: 26,280,000 m^{3} (21,306 acre⋅ft)
- Catchment area: 4,200 km^{2} (1,622 sq mi)
- Surface area: 1.9 km^{2} (1 sq mi)

Power Station
- Operator: Kansai Electric Power Company
- Installed capacity: 92 MW (Amagase); 466 MW Kisenyama PS

The Amagase Dam (天ヶ瀬ダム) is an arch dam on the Uji River just upstream from Uji, Kyoto Prefecture, Japan. The main purpose of the dam is flood control but it supports a hydroelectric power station and creates the lower reservoir for the Kisenyama Pumped Storage Plant. The dam itself serves a 92 MW power station while the pumped-storage power station upstream has a 466 MW capacity. Construction on the dam began in 1955 and it was complete in 1964. The pumped-storage power station became operational in 1970. Both plants are owned by Kansai Electric Power Company.

== Design ==
The dam is a 73 m (240 ft) tall, 254 m (833 ft) long variable-radius arch type with structural volume of 162,000 m^{3} (5,720,976 ft^{3}). The dam withholds a reservoir called Lake Hōō (鳳凰湖, Hōō-ko; lit. "Lake Phoenix") of 26,280,000 m^{3} (21,306 acre⋅ft) of which 20,000,000 m^{3} (16,214 acre⋅ft) is active or "useful" storage. It has a surface area of 1.9 km^{2} (1 sq mi).

The dam's spillway consists of four 4.36 m (14 ft) x 10 m (33 ft) floodgates on its crest with a maximum discharge capacity of 680 m^{3}/s (24,014 cu ft/s). In the middle of the dam body, there are three 3.6 m (12 ft) x 4.7 m (15 ft) gate-controlled orifice openings with a maximum discharge of 1,110 m^{3}/s (39,199 cu ft/s). The dam's power station has a 92 MW installed capacity and a discharge capacity of 186 m^{3}/s (6,569 cu ft/s).

== Kisenyama Pumped Storage Plant ==
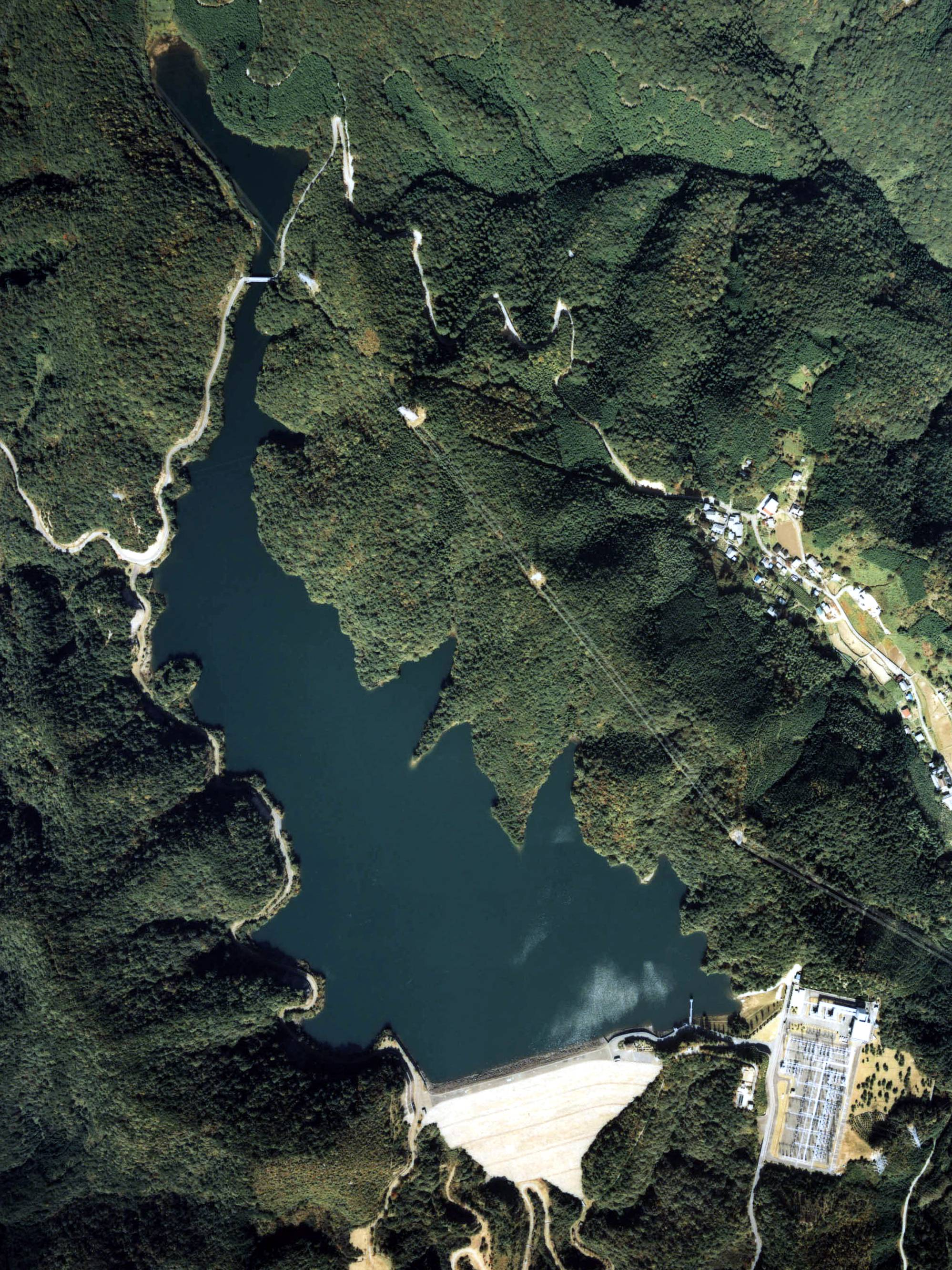
Kisenyama upper reservoir

Using Lake Hōō as the lower reservoir, water is pumped up to the upper reservoir via two pump-generators. The upper reservoir is created by a rock-fill dam 34°53′42″N 135°51′13″E that is 91 m (299 ft) high, 255 m (837 ft) long and has a crest width of 11 m (36 ft). The dam also has structural volume of 2,338,000 m^{3} (82,565,691 ft^{3}) and withholds a reservoir of 7,227,000 m^{3} (5,859 acre⋅ft) of which 5,408,000 m^{3} (4,384 acre⋅ft) is active storage. From the upper reservoir, water can be released back down to the power station 34°53′30″N 135°51′34″E where the two 233 MW reversible Francis turbine pump-generators use it for power production.

This process can be repeated and generation usually occurs during peak usage periods. The high water level at the upper reservoir is 296 m (971 ft) above sea level while it is 78.5 m (258 ft) ASL in the lower reservoir. This affords the power station an effective hydraulic head of 219.35 m (720 ft). Its discharge capacity is 248 m^{3}/s (8,758 cu ft/s). The first generator of the pumped-storage power station was operational in January 1970, and the second in July of that year. It has a maximum output of 466 MW.

== See also ==
- List of power stations in Japan
