= Misakubo Dam =

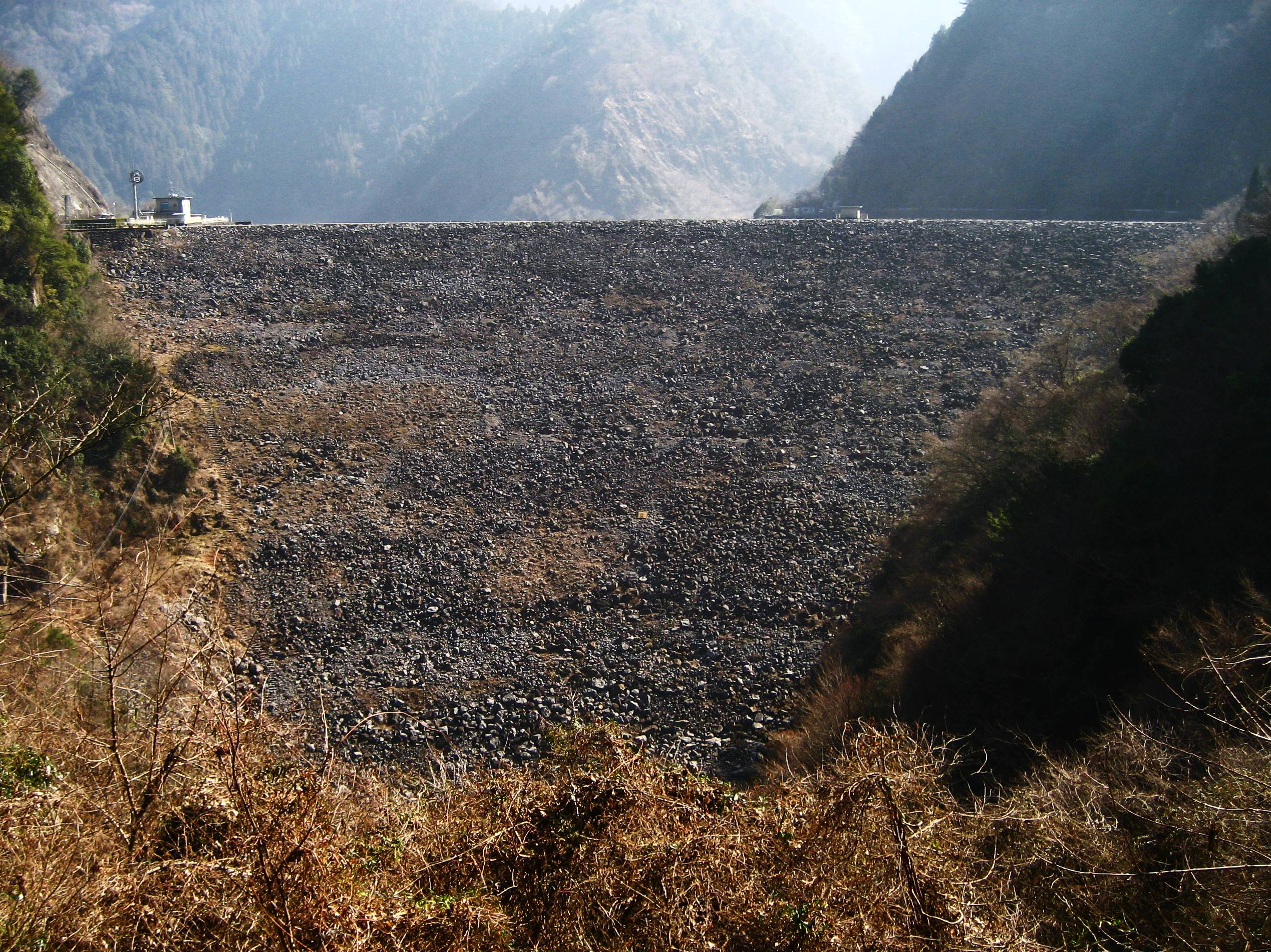
- Interactive map of Misakubo Dam
- Official name: 水窪ダム
- Location: Shizuoka Prefecture, Japan
- Coordinates: 35°11′05″N 137°55′54″E
- Construction began: 1967
- Opening date: 1969
- Operator: Electric Power Development Company

Dam and spillways
- Type of dam: Embankment
- Impounds: Tonaka River
- Height: 105 m (344 ft)
- Length: 258 m (846 ft)

Reservoir
- Creates: Misabuko Reservoir
- Total capacity: 30,000,000 m^{3} (1.1×10^{9} cu ft)
- Catchment area: 172.8 km^{2} (66.7 sq mi)
- Surface area: 84 ha (210 acres)

The Misakubo Dam (塩郷ダム, Misakubo Damu) is a dam on the Tonaka River, a tributary stream of the Misakubo River, itself a tributary of the Ōi River, located in Tenyrū-ku Hamamatsu, Shizuoka Prefecture, on the island of Honshū, Japan.

== History ==
The potential of the Ōi River valley for hydroelectric power development was realized by the Meiji government at the start of the 20th century. The Ōi River was characterized by a high volume of flow and a fast current. Its mountainous upper reaches and tributaries were areas of steep valleys and abundant rainfall, and were sparsely populated. From the 1930s through the 1960s, numerous concrete gravity dams had been constructed on the main flow of the Ōi River, and on its various tributary streams. The remote and steep-walled Misakubo valley was uninhabited, and was designated as the site for a new dam in the early 1960s.

== Construction ==
The Misakubo Dam was constructed to provide water for the 50,000 KW Misakubo Hydroelectric Plant. Construction work began in 1967 and was completed by 1969 by the Hazama Corporation at a cost of 11 billion yen. Unlike other dams on the Ōi River, the Misakubo is a rock-fill dam. Water from the dam is also diverted to the Sakuma Dam, where it provides increased flow to the hydroelectric power plant there. The Misakubo Reservoir created by the dam has been stocked with carp and Japanese smelt and is a popular fishing location due to its ease of access via Japan National Route 152.
