= Miyanaka Dam =

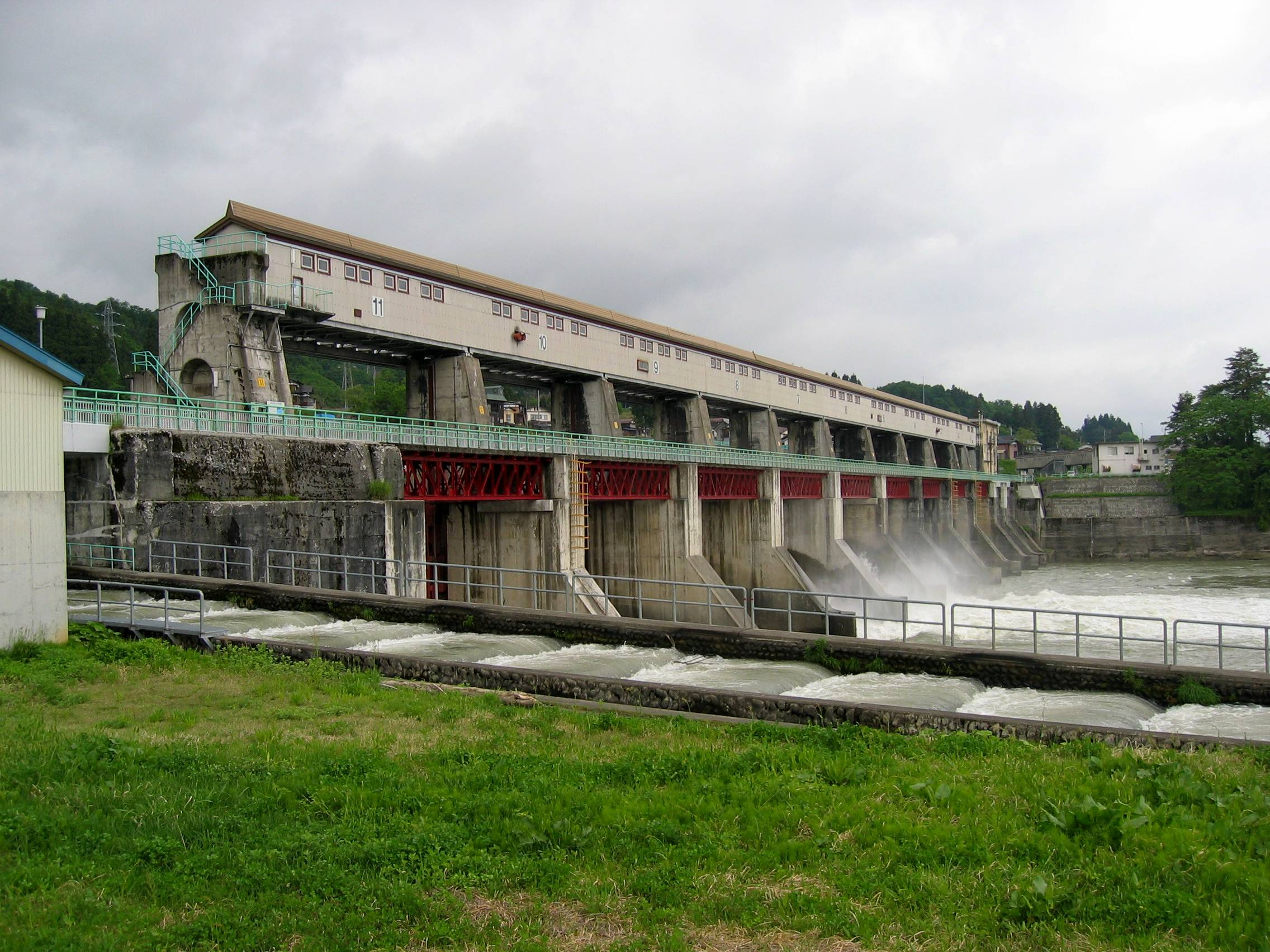
- Interactive map of Miyanaka Dam
- Location: Niigata Prefecture, Japan
- Coordinates: 37°04′00″N 138°41′53″E

Miyanaka Dam (Japanese: 宮中ダム) is a dam in the Niigata Prefecture, Japan, completed in 1938.
