= Futatsuya-Tōshukō Dam =

Dam in Fukui Prefecture of Japan

Coordinates: 35°42′56″N 136°16′50″E

Futatsuya-Toshuko Dam
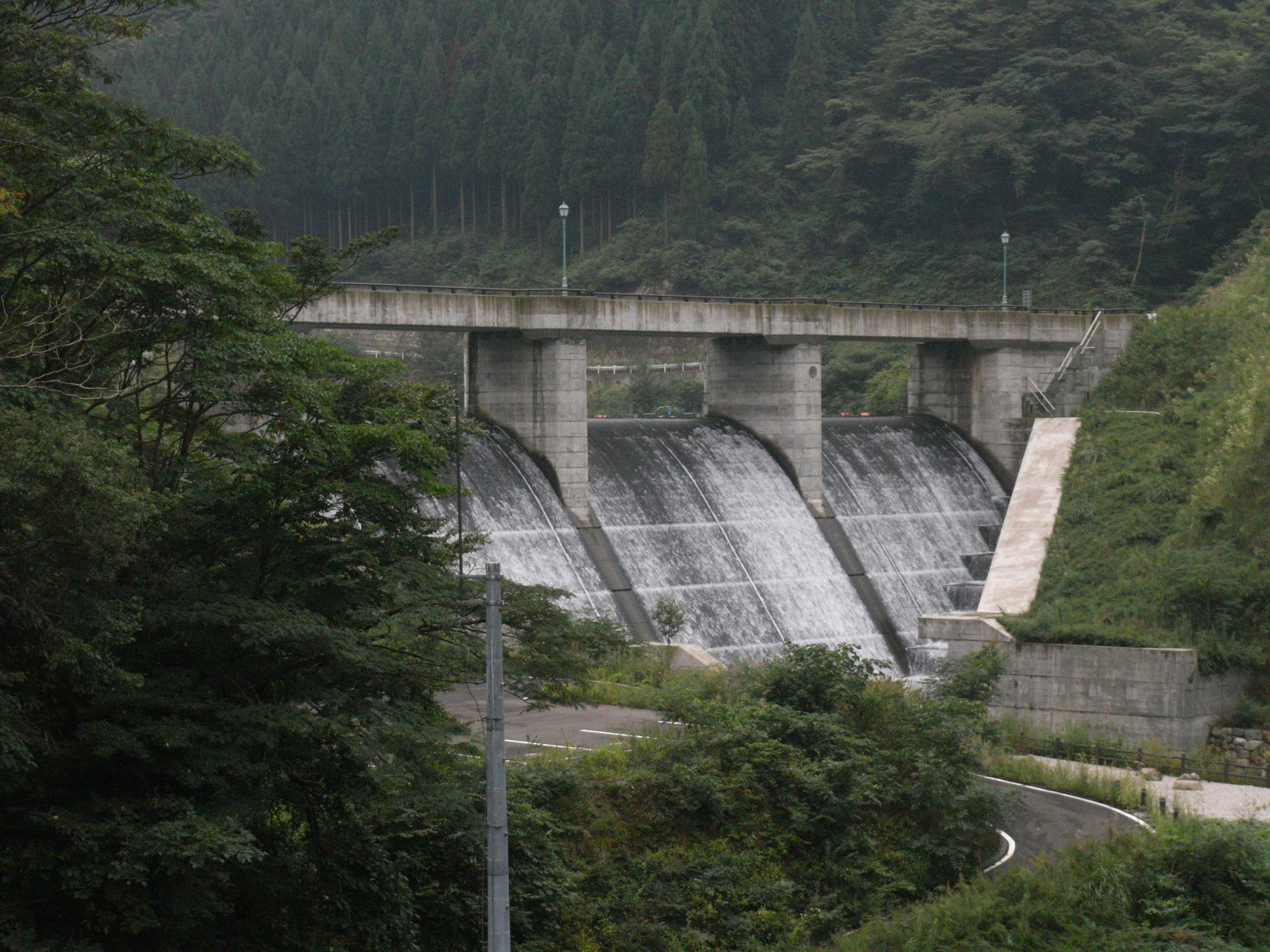
- Location: Fukui Prefecture, Japan

Dam and spillways
- Impounds: Hinogawa River

The Futatsuya-Toshuko Dam is a dam in Fukui Prefecture of Japan, completed in 2005.
