= Sasamagawa Dam =

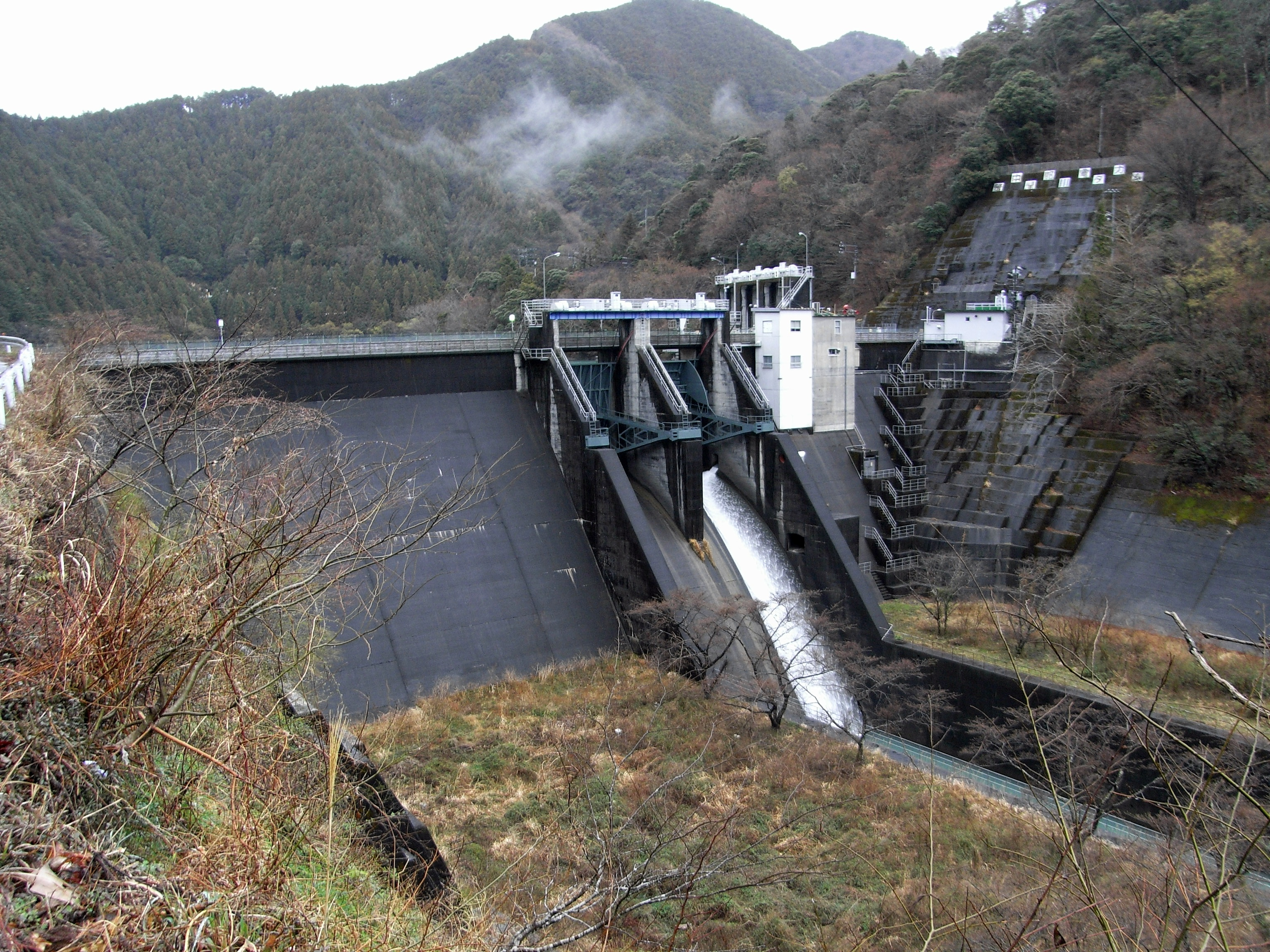
- Interactive map of Sasamagawa Dam
- Official name: 笹間川ダム
- Location: Shizuoka Prefecture, Japan
- Coordinates: 34°58′17″N 138°05′38″E
- Construction began: 1955
- Opening date: 1960
- Operator: Chubu Electric Power

Dam and spillways
- Impounds: Sasama River
- Height: 46.4 meters
- Length: 140.8 meters

Reservoir
- Total capacity: 6,340,000 m3
- Catchment area: 2025.8 km2
- Surface area: 46 hectares

The Sasamagawa Dam (笹間川ダム, Sasamagawa damu) is a dam on the Sasama River, a tributary of the Ōi River, located on the border of the city of Shimada and the town of Kawanehon, Shizuoka Prefecture on the island of Honshū, Japan.

== History ==
The potential of the Ōi River valley for hydroelectric power development was realized by the Meiji government at the start of the 20th century. The Ōi River was characterized by a high volume of flow and a fast current. Its mountainous upper reaches and tributaries were areas of steep valleys and abundant rainfall, and were sparsely populated. In 1906, a joint venture company, the Anglo-Japanese Hydroelectric Company (日英水力電気, Nichiei Suiroku Denki) was established, and began studies and design work on plans to exploit the potential of the Ōi River and Fuji River in Shizuoka Prefecture. The British interests were bought out by 1921, and the company was renamed Hayakawa Electric (早川電力, Hayakawa Denryoku). By the mid-1950s, numerous dams had been constructed on the main flow of the Ōi River, and developers began to turn their attention to its various tributary streams.

The Sasamagawa Dam and neighboring Shiogo Dam were constructed to provide water for the 58,000 KW Kawaguchi Hydroelectric Plant built by the Shimada city government. Construction work began in 1955 and was completed by 1960 by the Hazama Corporation. The dam serves a secondary purpose in providing water for irrigation to farms in the surrounding area.

== Design ==
The Sasagawa Dam was designed as a solid core concrete gravity dam with a central spillway.
